= Conservation and restoration of neon objects =

Preservation and maintenance of tangible objects

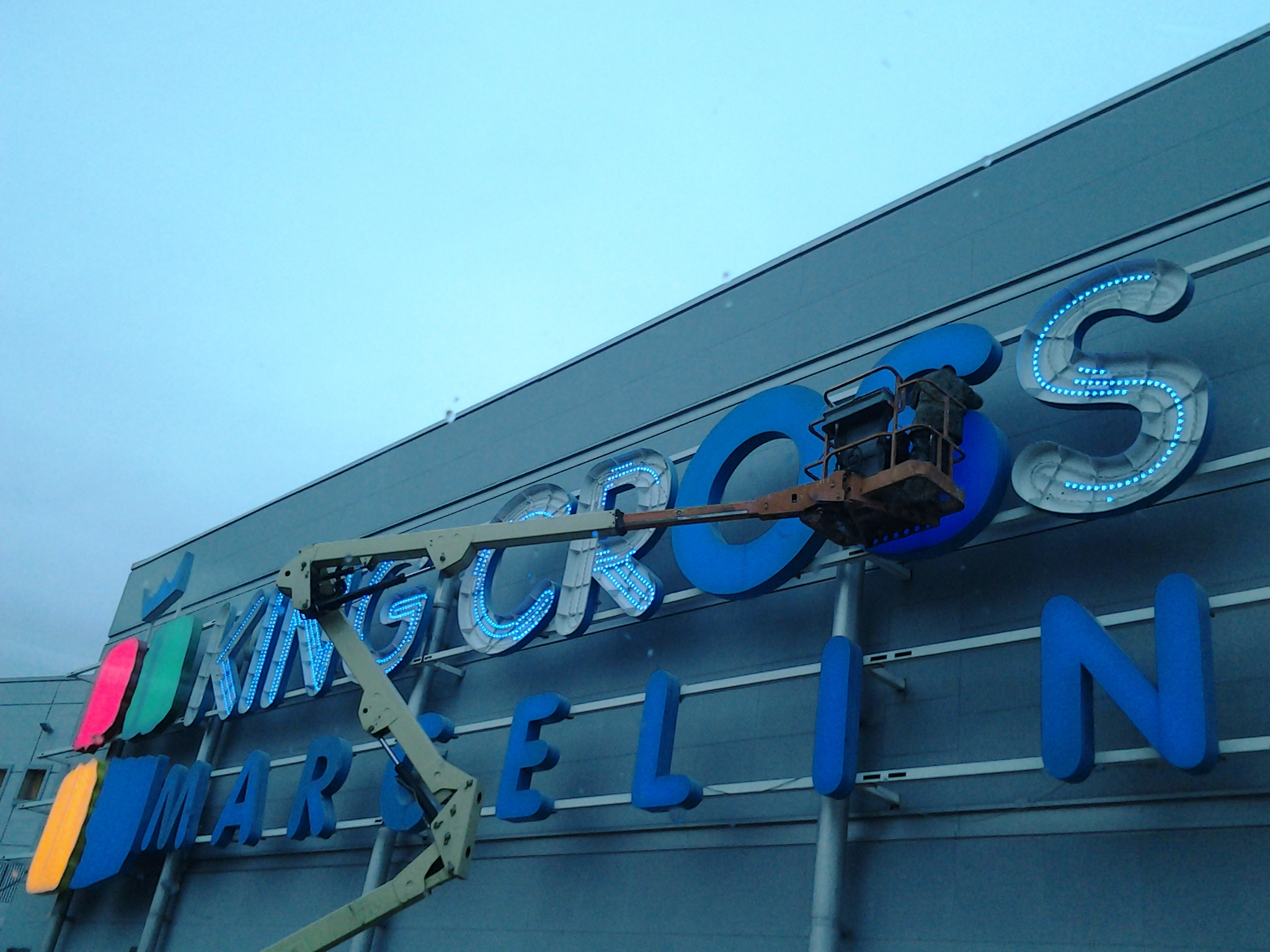
Repairing an historical neon sign in situ

The conservation and restoration of neon objects is the process of caring for and maintaining neon objects (artworks), and includes documentation, examination, research, and treatment to ensure their long-term viability, when desired.

== Neon Technology ==
Georges Claude, a French engineer, developed neon technology in 1910. Claude introduced neon technology in Paris, and it later became popular in the United States during the 1920s for use in advertising signage. Its popularity rose until the 1940s, after which neon signage was used less due to the invention of inexpensive plastics.

Neon lights are low-pressure gas discharge bulbs. They produce light by charging noble gases in glass cathode tubes with electricity.

=== Tubes ===
Neon bulbs are composed of noble gases sealed in glass tubing. The tubing can be bent by a professional glass blower or neon vendor into a variety of shapes to produce different imagery or text. The tube is vacuum-pumped to remove all air, after which a small amount of selected gases are pumped into the tube prior to permanently sealing.

Each end of the tube is fitted with metal terminals called electrodes, also as known as cathodes. When the electrodes are connected to an energy source, the tube will glow as the gas becomes electrically excited. Different gases produce different colors. The glass tubing can also be coated or tinted, and different tubing and gas combinations can produce a range of 150 colors.

=== Gases ===
Noble gases are sealed inside airtight cathode tubes, and produce light when they are electrically excited. Different gases and gas combinations will produce different colors, and are used in varying degrees in neon lights:

| Gas | Frequency of use | Color produced |
|---|---|---|
| Neon | Very Popular | Orange-Red |
| Argon | Very Popular | Blue-Lavender |
| Yellow Phosphor | Common | Yellow; Orange |
| Mercury | Common | Blue; Green; Yellow |
| Helium | Common | White |
| Xenon | Rare | Blue-White |
| Krypton | Rare | White-Green |

== Neon in fine art ==
Prior to the 1960s, neon technology was associated with advertising and was not considered fine art. In the 1960s, visual artists began experimenting with neon in mixed media and installation artworks. Prominent neon artworks during this time include Jasper Johns' Field Painting (c. 1963–1964), James Rosenquist's Tumbleweed (1963–1966), and Robert Rauschenberg's Green Shirt (1965–1967).

Chryssa, a Greek artist, is largely credited with establishing neon as a visual art form. She was very active in the 1960s and 1970s and created large-scale works with a focus on and constant incorporation of neon. Other artists began exploring the neon technology in 1970s, and have continued to do so in contemporary art making.

Some artists both design and create neon artworks by learning the skill set; however, the majority of artists rely on professional neon vendors to fabricate artworks following the artists' design.

Neon artworks can be found in many permanent public collections, including the Museum of Modern Art, New York, the Art Institute of Chicago, Chicago, Illinois, and the Smithsonian American Art Museum, Washington, D.C. In 1981, Lili Lakich and Richard John Jenkins founded the Museum of Neon Art (MONA) in Los Angeles, whose collection preserves and exhibits historical neon advertisements and neon fine art. In 2011, the museum closed its downtown Los Angeles location and reopened in 2016 in Glendale, California.

== Collection care and maintenance of neon artworks ==
=== Packing and Handling ===
Unpacking a neon artwork slowly and carefully will help avoid damage. As the glass tubes are fragile, they may become damaged during shipping. The glass tubes and base of neon objects are often packed and transported separately to avoid breakage. The base can be first mounted; then, the tubes can be installed and secured with copper wire ties. Preparing a condition report of the work after receipt will document if any of the tubes or components were cracked or broken during transit, and can be addressed by a professional prior to display. Once neon artwork is unpacked, prepare to handle the object(s) as little as possible to avoid damage. Unpacking artworks in teams of at least two people will better allow safer handling of the work, and may aid in documentation and recording.

=== Cleaning ===
Over time, neon artworks may collect dust. To ensure safety of personnel and the artwork, neon artworks should be turned off and unplugged prior to any cleaning. Trained professionals may undertake cleaning the work with approved materials such as a feather duster or dry paintbrush. The use of water or other cleaning liquids may pose a safety hazard due to potential contact with the electrical components. A professional conservator, specialist, or electrician should be consulted whenever:

- Any component of the artwork requires more than a light dusting.
- Part or all of the neon tubes are flickering/failing to illuminate.
- There is any rusting of the metal support structures.
- The piece incurs any damage.

Cleaning neon objects can also include the components other than the glass tubes. Some objects are also composed of "metal cans" (particularly historic neon signs) that often serve as backdrops to the tubing. These may also need cleaning, scraping and repainting.

=== Electrical safety ===
Outlets: Neon artworks require electricity in order to function. A building electrical engineer should always be consulted prior to installing and displaying a neon artwork to confirm safe use of an electrical outlet. Most neon works operate using a large high voltage transformer, and some can require multiple transformers. An outlet should never be overloaded. If an outlet feels warm, an electrician should be consulted before further use.

Cords: Electrical cords connecting a neon artwork to a power source should be checked on a regular basis for any signs of fraying or wear and tear. The placement of cords is also important. If cords are run in high traffic areas, they may pose a tripping hazard to visitors, which could potentially result in personal injury and damage to the cord and/or artwork. The placement of cords in and against walls and out of traffic areas provide better safety and use. Use of extension cords are not recommended, as they increase the risk of potential electrical and tripping hazards. Review of the artwork and its installation, including outlet and cord placement, by curatorial, installation, and electrical staff will help ensure the safety of the artwork.

Transformers: A transformer is used to convert electricity into use by the neon sign. When cataloging a neon artwork, the transformer type and age may be noted in the artwork record, along with a reminder about potential future transformer replacements. An electrical engineer or professional should be consulted to identify the voltage type and requirements of the artwork's transformers.

Like other media, neon artworks should be monitored and condition reports performed on a regular basis. If an artwork appears to flicker or fails to illuminate, the work can first be assessed on display. Potential problems may include damage to the tubes, disruptions to the electrical components, including frayed wires or unplugged cords, or potential disruptions of the electrical supply (such as a power outage in the building or circuit). Prior to removing from display, the work should be turned off and disconnected from the electrical source. Flickering may indicate a problem with gas pressures inside the tubes (possibly a result of age and/or damaged tubes) or a failing transformer.

=== Handling damaged neon ===
Cracked or damaged neon tubes present potential health risks from contact with broken glass and exposure to mercury, a heavy metal contaminant, in gas form. Though any mercury vapor, if present, will be in small amounts, steps should still be taken to avoid contamination. If a neon tube appears damaged, it should not be handled. If handling is required for removal, barrier gloves, such as nitrile, and protective covering, such an apron or smock, will help avoid potential contamination to personnel. Broken tubes should be stored separately from other collection items to avoid contamination, and clearly labeled with hazard labels. The broken tubes will require assessment from a professional conservator/neon specialist.

== Re-fabrication ==
Neon art inside the Pershing Square Metro subway station in downtown Los Angeles, California LCCN2013631609

=== Inherent vice ===
Neon technology is non-archival. The gases have limited lifespans, and electrical components will degrade over time. This may result in a limited display capacity for a neon work, e.g. diminished or intermittent light, a complete loss of function, and could pose safety risks. It is important to consider artistic intent when making conservation decisions, as some artists create works with their predicted degradation in mind.

=== Conservation ===
Unlike other traditional art mediums, such as painting, conservation of neon artworks and other new materials does not necessarily focus on preservation of the original materials. Because neon is a relatively recent technology and media, there is less data available about how it changes over time and how to inhibit degradation. In order to successfully conserve a contemporary artwork such as neon, the conservator must:

- Identify the materials, understand how they were applied and how they function.
- Collect detailed information about their alteration over time.
- Preserve the artist's intent.
- Document their work.

=== Repair and replacement ===
If the media or technology cannot be safely recovered or addressed, new and/or replacement technology may be used to return the artwork to a state as close as possible to that originally envisioned by the artist. This re-fabrication may be undertaken by a conservator, by a neon fabricator, or by the artist themselves. In some cases the artist may have outlined restrictions or instructions for the repair of their artworks. Because neon artwork components are shaped by hand, replacement components may look subtly different from prior forms, and an attempt should be made to recruit the neon-maker who made the original when replacements are necessary. Achieving an exact color match is also difficult, and fabricators typically select the closest color match they are able to find, but this too may create subtle changes in a piece's overall appearance.

Re-fabrication may include the repair and/or replacement of the following:

- The neon tubes.
- Electrical components such as cords and transformers.
- The work's support structure.
- Other media included in the work.

Neon tubes may partially burn out, and a conservator may identify the burned out portion of a neon artwork through use of a neon light tester, also known as a test light or voltage tester. This electronic test device is used to determine whether an electric current is running through the equipment being tested.

Transformers last approximate ten to fifteen years, and older transformers may fail or pose safety risks, and require replacement. Failure to replace an older transformer may result in flickering in the neon artwork, or complete failure to light. It is important to consult an electrical engineer or professional to confirm the voltage type and requirements for the replacement transformer.

=== Miami Line by Rockne Krebs ===
An example of re-fabrication is the conservation of Rockne Krebs' Miami Line. In 1984, the Miami-Dade County's Art in Public Places program commissioned Krebs to create a public artwork for the Metrorail. The resulting work, Miami Line, consisted of a rainbow of neon lights spanning the 1,540 bridge. Over time, the vibrations caused by trains on the bridge caused the neon lights to burn out, and by 2013, the entire work was no longer illuminated. The Art in Public Places program worked with the artist's estate to develop a plan to recreate the work using LED lights, which would be resistant to train vibrations, but still maintain the visual effect created by the artist. Electrical assessments and conservation of the work began in 2014, and the work will be relit upon completion.

== Replication ==
Replication differs from Re-fabrication in that the original artwork is not altered, and instead a copy is produced for temporary exhibition purposes. While the replica may not contain the same materials used in the original artwork, the finished product is approximately identical of the original. Replications are exhibition copies and are considered more replaceable than re-fabrications.

=== Criteria ===
Replication can only be undertaken with the approval of the artist or the artist's estate. Bruce Nauman is an artist who requires four criteria be met to replicate his original neon artworks. These criteria are:

1. The original neon must still be in existence and in working order.
2. The current owner must agree to loan the work prior to the creation of a replica.
3. The display credit line for the loaned artwork acknowledges the work on view is an exhibition copy and acknowledges the owner of the original artwork.
4. The replica will be destroyed at the completion of the exhibition, which must be proven through photographic documentation.

=== None Sing Neon Sign by Bruce Nauman ===
The Guggenheim holds four versions of None Sing Neon Sign by Bruce Nauman. Of these four, one is a 1970 fabrication, a 2005 exhibition copy, a 2006 exhibition copy, and a 2013 exhibition copy. The 2005 and 2006 copies were made by Nauman's approved fabricator but were significantly different from the original 1970 fabrication. The Guggenheim commissioned the 2013 copy as a result of these differences.

== Neon artists ==
- Stephen Antonakos
- Chryssa
- Shezad Dawood
- Frida Blumenberg
- Tracey Emin
- Dan Flavin
- Michael Hayden
- Robert Irwin
- Joseph Kosuth
- Piotr Kowalski
- Lili Lakich
- Mario Merz
- Victor Millonzi
- Maurizio Nannucci
- Bruce Nauman
- Iván Navarro
- Keith Sonnier
- Tim White-Sobieski
