= Millonzi =

Millonzi is a surname. Notable people with the surname include:

- Robert I. Millonzi (1910–1986), American lawyer
- Victor Millonzi (1915–1997), American painter and sculptor
