= Base / Progetti per l'arte =

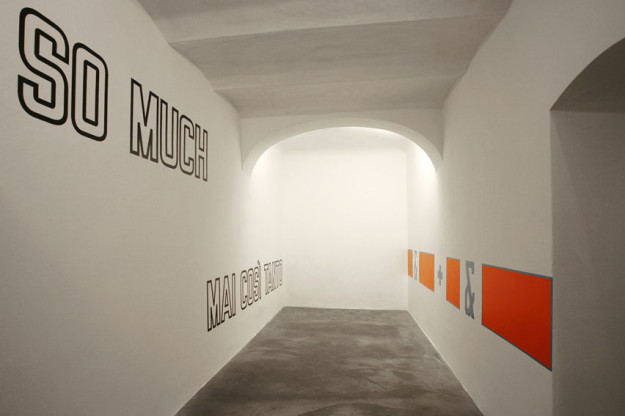
Lawrence Weiner / Base / Progetti per l'arte / Firenze / Via San Niccolo 18r / Italy

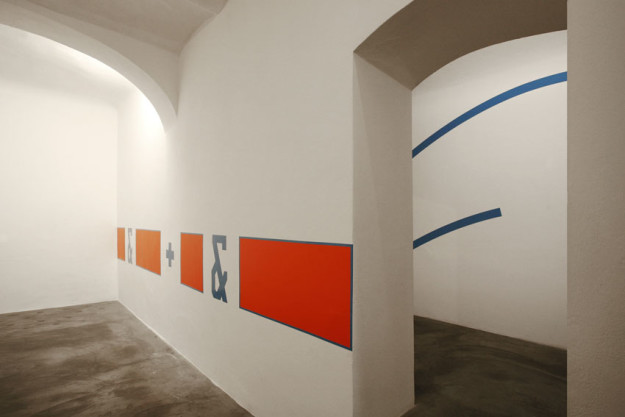
Lawrence Weiner / Base / Progetti per l'arte / Firenze / Via San Niccolo 18r / Italy

Base / Progetti per l'arte is a non profit artist run space established in 1998 in Florence, Italy, by a collective of artists who live and work in Tuscany. Base in an idea by artists for other artists.

== Artist collective ==
Base / Progetti per l'arte was founded by:

- Antonio Catelani
- Carlo Guaita
- Paolo Masi
- Massimo Nannucci
- Maurizio Nannucci and Paolo Parisi

Currently Base / Progetti per l'arte artist collective is formed by:

- Mario Airò
- Marco Bagnoli
- Massimo Bartolini
- Vittorio Cavallini
- Yuki Ichihashi
- Paolo Masi
- Massimo Nannucci
- Maurizio Nannucci
- Paolo Parisi
- Remo Salvadori
- Enrico Vezzi

== Exhibitions ==
Since its foundation Base / Progetti per l'arte has presented site specific installations including:

- Sol LeWitt
- Marco Bagnoli
- Alfredo Pirri
- Cesare Pietroiusti
- Niele Toroni
- Michael Galasso
- Jan Vercruysse
- Heimo Zobernig
- Luca Pancrazzi
- Marco Fusinato and John Nixon
- Ingo Springenschmid
- Paolo Masi
- Antoni Muntadas
- Robert Barry
- Luca Vitone
- Liliana Moro
- Claude Closky
- Remo Salvadori
- Pietro Sanguineti
- Liam Gillick
- Massimo Bartolini
- Mario Airò
- Eva Marisaldi
- Rainer Ganahl
- François Morellet
- Bernhard Rüdiger
- Nedko Solakov & Slava Nakovska
- Olaf Nicolai
- Kinkaleri
- Rirkrit Tiravanija
- Matt Mullican
- Michel Verjux
- Elisabetta Benassi
- Pedro Cabrita Reis
- Pietro Riparbelli
- Simone Berti
- Jeppe Hein
- Gerwald Rockenschaub
- Jonathan Monk
- Peter Kogler
- Carsten Nicolai
- Surasi Kusolwong
- Franz West
- Tino Sehgal
- Nico Dockx
- Grazia Toderi
- Armin Linke
- Davide Bertocchi
- Pierre Bismuth
- Olivier Mosset
- Stefano Arienti
- Erwin Wurm
- Thomas Bayrle
- Diego Perrone and Christian Frosi
- Hans Schabus
- Maurizio Mochetti
- Lawrence Weiner
- Amedeo Martegani
- Gianni Caravaggio
- Piero Golia
- David Tremlett
- Franco Vaccari
- Remo Buti
- Gianni Pettena
- Superstudio
- Lapo Binazzi & Ufo 9999
- Zziggurat
- Koo Jeong A
- Christian Jankowski
- Giuseppe Gabellone
- Martin Creed
- Ken Lum
- Nedko Solakov
- Richard Long
