= Lisa Schulte =

Lisa Schulte may refer to:

- Lisa Schulte (artist)
- Lisa Schulte (luger)

== See also ==
- Lisa Schulte Moore, American landscape ecologist
