= Paolo Parisi =

Italian artist and professor of art

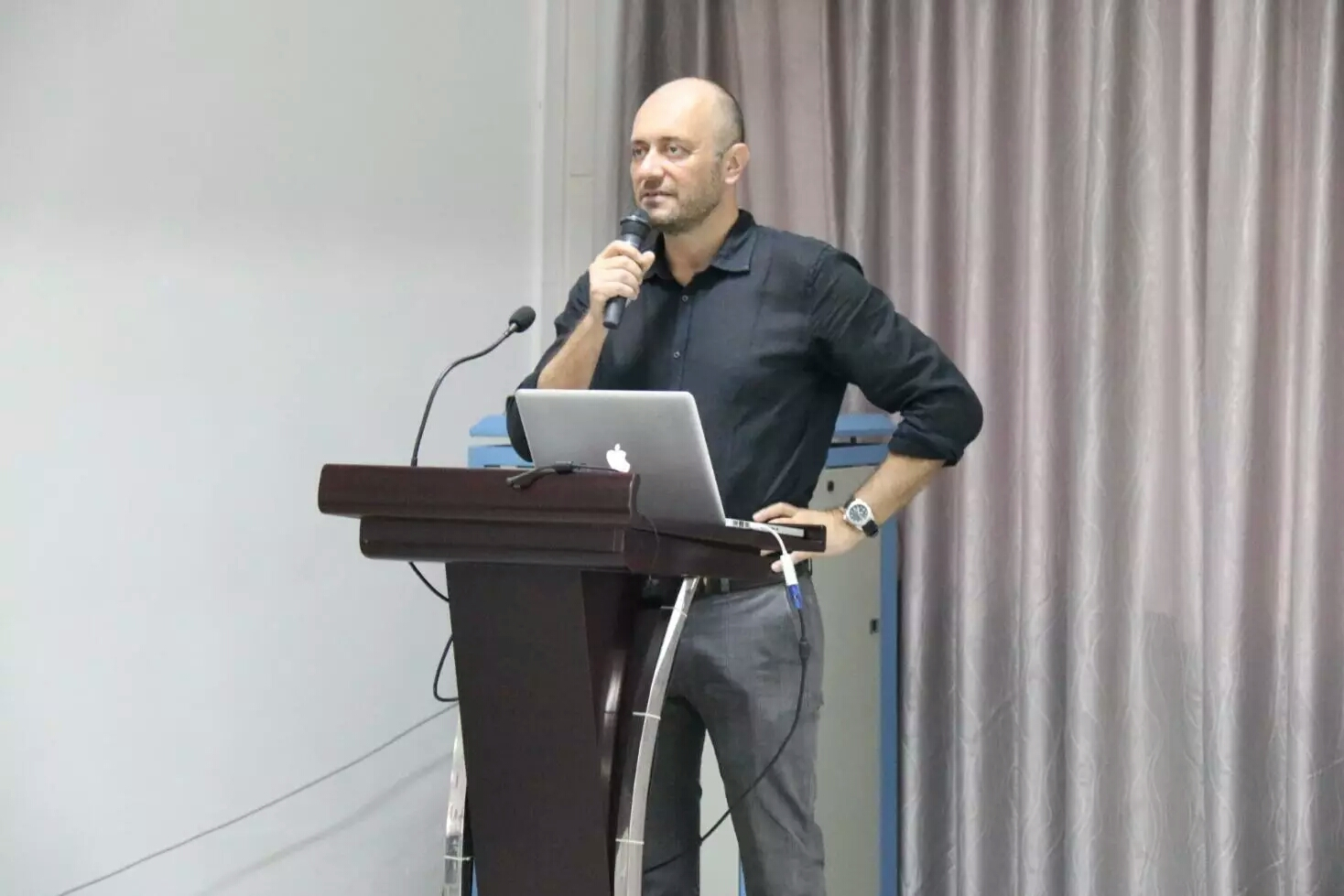
Paolo Parisi (2016)

Paolo Parisi (born 23 August 1965 in Catania) is an Italian artist and professor of art.

== Life and work ==
Paolo Parisi was born in Italy in 1965 in the Sicilian port city of Catania. His career as an artist began in the 1990s after he graduated in painting from the Accademia di Belle Arti in Florence.

In 1998, together with Antonio Catelani, Carlo Guaita, Paolo Masi, Massimo Nannucci and Maurizio Nannucci, Paolo Parisi founded the non-profit art space BASE / Progetti per l'arte in Florence where until 2023 more than ninety exhibitions have been realized and shown.

By using different media such as painting, sound and light, Paolo Parisi explores in his practice the possibility of the existence of painting in the so-called "expanded field". In this way he opens a physical dimension to the visual experience.

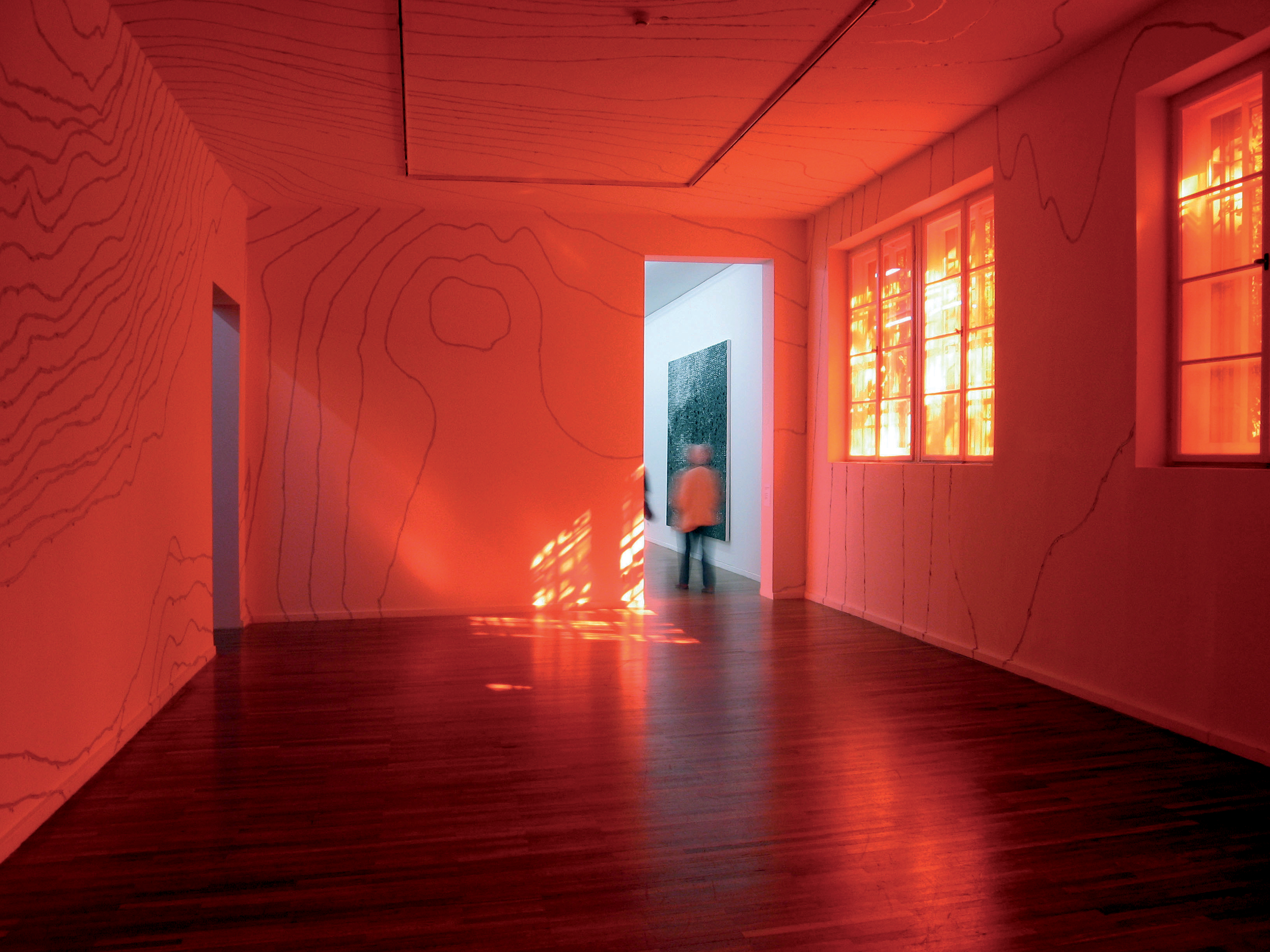
Installation Shot of Paolo Parisi's exhibition "Observatorium - Against The Stream" at Lenbachhaus 2006

The artist's works have been presented in numerous solo and group exhibitions in Italy, and also in other countries, including Germany, France, Japan and in China. His first solo exhibition in a museum outside Italy was held in 2006 at the Städtische Galerie im Lenbachhaus and Kunstbau Munich with the title Observatorium (Against the Stream). For this exhibition, he conceived a synthesis of his work directly related to the exhibition spaces of Lenbachhaus, highlighting the different aspects of his entire oeuvre.

Since 1993, Parisi has combined his profession as an artist with teaching activities at art academies in Italy and abroad. Thus, from 1993 to 2010, he taught Art at the Accademia di Belle Arti di Bologna. Since 2010, Parisi has held a professorship at the Accademia di Belle Arti in Florence. Since 2023, he has also been Vice Director of the Accademia di Belle Arti.

Paolo Parisi lives and works in Florence.

== Exhibitions (selection) ==
Solo Exhibitions (Selection)

- 2023: Paolo Parisi, The Problem of Sharing the Available Space Compared to the Color of Panting ...and the Atmospheric Dust, Massimo Ligreggi Gallery, Catania
- 2021: Paolo Parisi. The Weather was Mild on the Day of my Departure, Building Gallery, Milan
- 2018: Paolo Parisi, M U S E O, Museo Novecento, Florenz
- 2013: Paolo Parisi, Paesaggi | Landscapes, Galleria Enrico Astuni, Bologna
- 2008: Observatorium (Museum), Centro per l’Arte Contemporanea Luigi Pecci, Prato
- 2006: Paolo Parisi. Observatorium – Gegen den Strom, Städtische Galerie im Lenbachhaus und Kunstbau, München
- 2003: Color Mind. Katharina Grosse / Paolo Parisi, Galleria Primo Piano, Rom
- 2001: One close to other (about Landscape and Architecture), Aller Art Verein, Bludenz
- 1996: Uno sull’altro e uno accanto all’altro, Galleria Gianluca Collica, Catania

Group Exhibitions (Selection)

- 2022: No, Neon, No Cry, MAMbo – Galleria d'Arte Moderna di Bologna, Bologna
- 2018 Mental Landscapes / Natural Trajectories, collateral Event auf der Manifesta 12, Palermo
- 2017: Io sono qui!, Museo d’Arte Contemporanea di Roma, Testaccio, Rome
- 2015: Masterpieces of the Farnesina Collection. A glance at Italian art from the 1950s to the present, Museum für Zeitgenössische Kunst, Zagreb
- 2013: Trip and Travelling. Introduction / What is missing? Klaipėda Culture Communication Center (KCCC), Klaipeda
- 2013: Primavera 2, CNEAI, Ile des Impressionnistes, Chatou, Paris
- 2010: Collezione Paolo Brodbeck: Pittura Italiana 1949/2010, Fondazione Brodbeck, Catania
- 2010: PPS, Riso, Museum für zeitgenössische Kunst in Sizilien, Palermo
- 2009: Italian Genius Now (back to Rome), Museo d’Arte Contemporanea di Roma, Rom
- 2007: Italian Genius Now (back to Rome), Museum of Fine Arts, Hanoi / White House, Singapour
- 2005: Collezione permanente, Centro per l’arte contemporanea Luigi Pecci, Prato
- 2001: Leggerezza, Ein Blick auf zeitgenössische Kunst in Italien, Städtische Galerie im Lenbachhaus und Kunstbau, München
- 2001: Abitanti. Arte in relazione, Palazzo Fabroni, Pistoia
- 2000: Undici, Centro per l’Arte Contemporanea Palazzo Fichera, Catania
- 1997: Unna, Fortezzo da basso, Florenz

== Literature ==
- Paolo Parisi. Observatorium (Museum), Hrsg. von Centro per l´arte contemporanea Luigi Pecci, Prato 2008, ISBN 978-88-85191-28-0
- Paolo Parisi. Observatorium – gegen den Strom. Hrsg. von Helmut Friedel, Lenbachhaus München, München 2006, ISBN 3-907474-34-1
