= Michael Flechtner =

American artist

Michael Robert Flechtner (born June 19, 1951) is an American artist known for his work in neon art. In 2009 he was commissioned by the United States Postal Service to create the first-ever neon postage stamp for the Forever Stamp series. The "Celebrate" stamp was released in 2011. The stamp was reissued in 2015, and the original 33-by-44-inch (84 cm × 112 cm) neon is on exhibit at the Smithsonian National Postal Museum.

Flechtner graduated with a degree in Fine Arts in 1981 from Columbus College of Art and Design. An Ohio native, with a Masters in Fine Art (sculpture & painting) from Wichita State University, Flechtner moved to Los Angeles in the mid-1980s, inspired first by the artist Stephen Antonakos and subsequent visit to the Museum of Neon Art (MONA), then located in Downtown Los Angeles. Flechtner now sits on MONA's advisory board.

Flechtner says his fascination with light began when he was a child: "I’d go to church and see light streaming through the stained glass windows, my father, replacing bulbs sitting in a pile Christmas lights and various flavors of Jell-O." His public art includes "A Neon Aquarium" at the corner of Olympic and Sawtelle in Los Angeles, and installations in Minneapolis and Tokyo. In 2019 he began the physical reproduction and replacement of the neon signage at the drive-in movie theater in his home town of Tiffin, Ohio.

Flechtner is the recipient of a J. Paul Getty Trust Fund Fellowship for the Visual Arts, the Botticelli Award, and Ford Foundation Award.
