= Great American Lesbian Art Show =

The Great American Lesbian Art Show (GALAS) was an art exhibition at the Woman's Building (a feminist art center) in Los Angeles, California with associated events in other locations. It ran from 3–31 May 1980. The Los Angeles Gay and Lesbian Community Services Center also supported the exhibit.

== Structure ==
The GALAS consisted of an "invitational" event, a curated exhibition of the work of ten selected artists, and many "regional" or "sister" exhibitions in multiple cities across the United States. These locations included New York City, San Francisco, Boston, Chicago, Bozeman, Winter Park, Lawrence, Alexandria, and Anchorage among "over 200 shows and events." According to Margo Hobbs Thompson, the art displayed constituted "a critique of contemporary gender norms." It was described by Terry Wolverton, one of the organizers, as "a year-long project to bring national recognition to lesbian art and artists." All of the invited artists lived in either Los Angeles or New York. GALAS was curated by the GALAS Collective including: Terry Wolverton, Bia Lowe, Jody Isanna Palmer, Tyaga, and Louise Moore.

== Artists invited ==
The artists invited to participate in the curated exhibit were:

- Lula Mae Blocton
- Tee Corinne
- Betsy Damon
- Louise Fishman
- Nancy Fried
- Harmony Hammond
- Debbie Jones
- Lili Lakich
- Gloria Longval
- Kate Millett (although she identified as bisexual, not lesbian)

== Origins ==
Planning for the GALAS started in the spring of 1979. The organizing group, known as the GALAS Collective, was separate from the Lesbian Art Project, which also met at the Woman's Building, although there was some overlap of membership.

== Reactions ==
Tyaga, one of the event curators, was quoted by the Los Angeles Times while the exhibition was running as saying: "Just having the name 'Great American Lesbian Art Show' says a lot. It helps overcome fear. Art is non-threatening--it hangs on the wall and people look. It's the label that's the threat."

Harmony Hammond, writing in the Encyclopedia of Lesbian and Gay Histories and Cultures said that GALAS was "noteworthy for its innovative curatorial structure" and that it "marked the first time that lesbians of color participated in a major exhibition of lesbian art."

Christopher Reed described GALAS as "poorly documented" but said that it showed "a greater interest in figuration among lesbian artists outside New York."

Simon LeVay wrote about the art displayed at GALAS and another exhibition of roughly the same time: "For the first time a wide range of artists were willing to be public about being lesbians, although some of them still kept lesbian content as a suggestion rather than an overt statement in their art."

Sarah L. Stifler wrote of the "variety of media" in GALAS, but said that it did not include the "blatant references to sexuality" that were featured in the 1990 exhibition "All but the Obvious" (ABO). Stifler also wrote that "Much of my research has focused on" GALAS and ABO.

== See also ==
- Lesbian Art Project
