= Neon lighting =

Electric lighting using rarefied gas

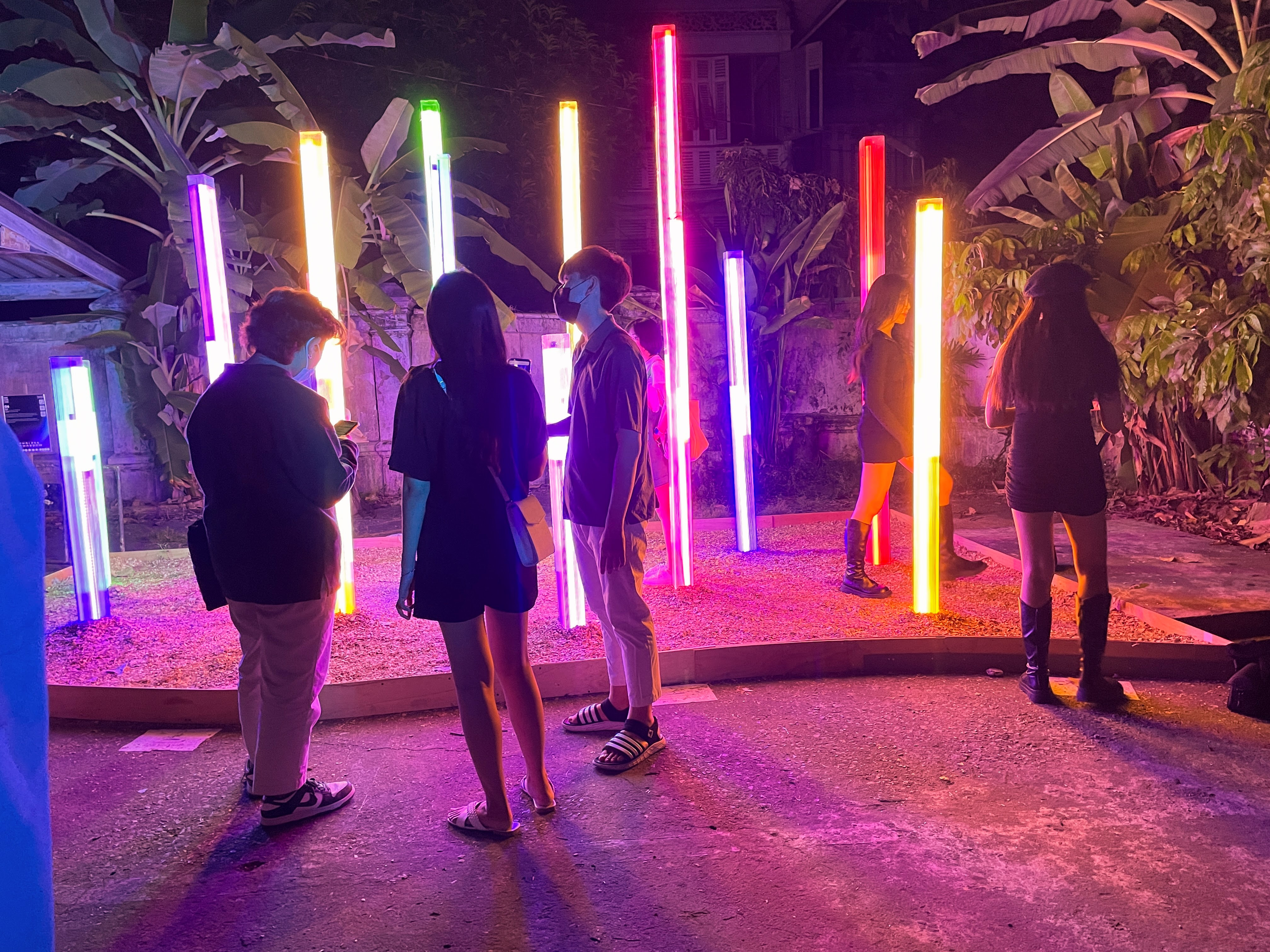
A neon light art installation in Bangkok

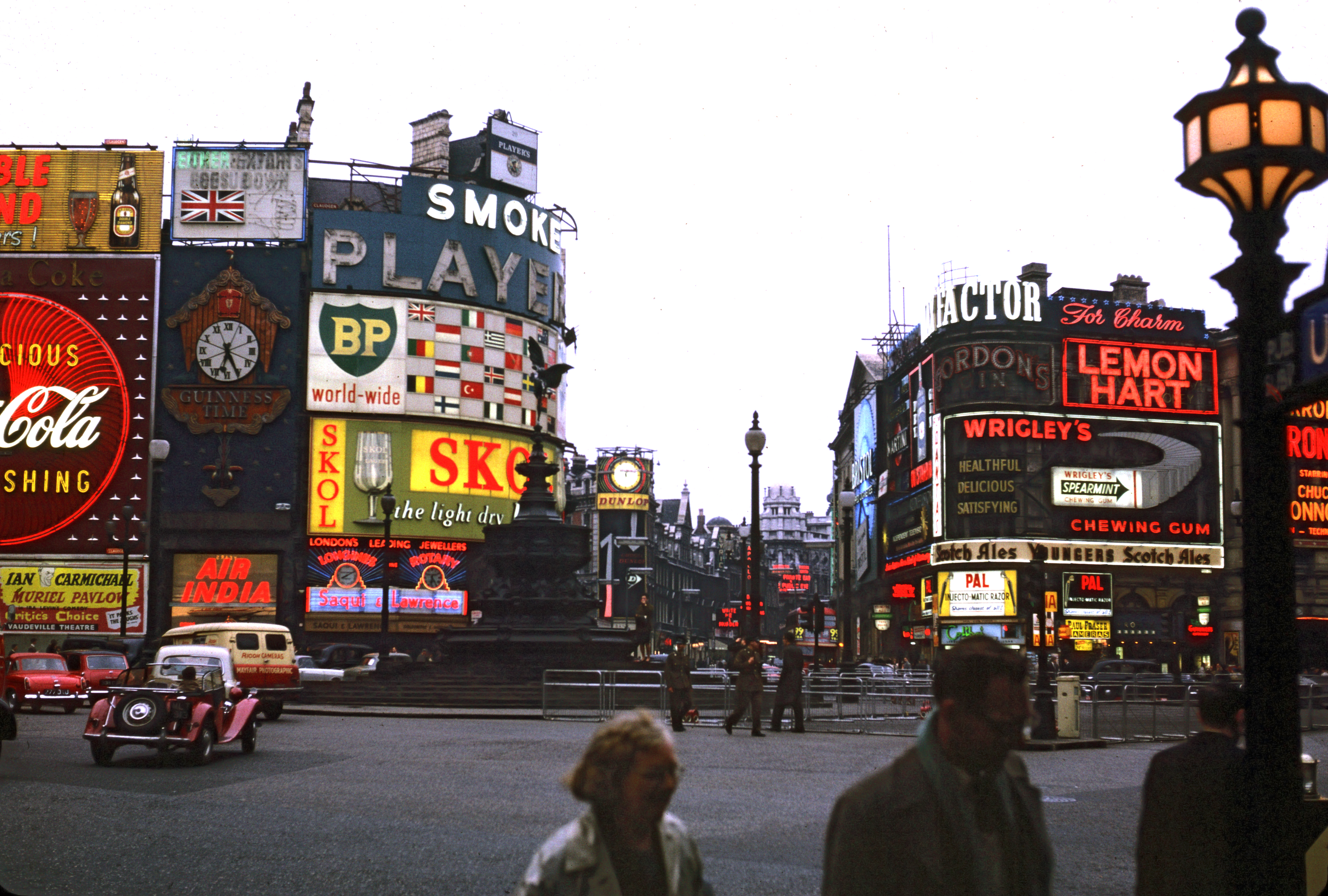
Piccadilly Circus, London in 1962. The first neon sign, for Bovril, was installed here in 1923.

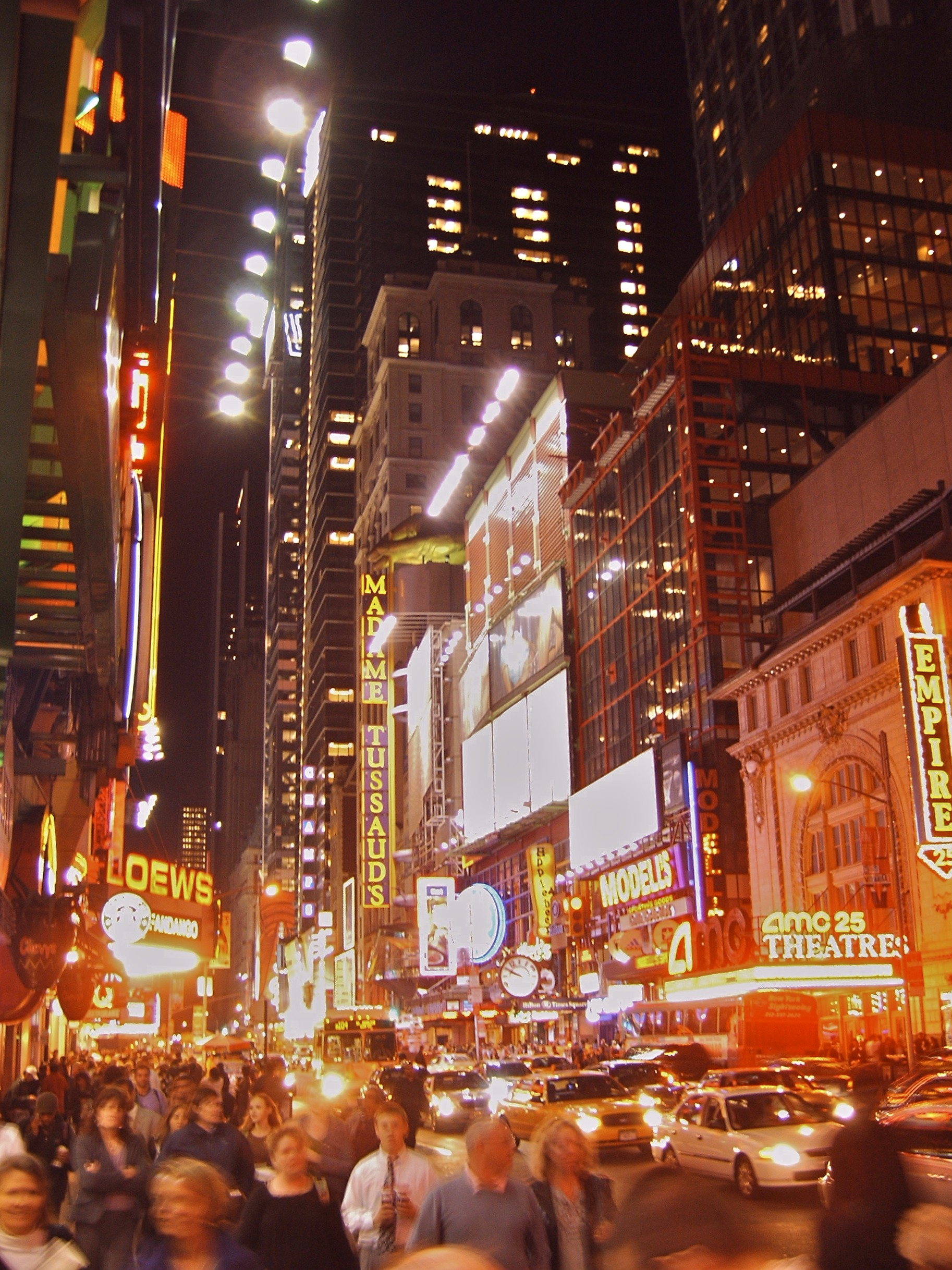
The vicinity of Times Square, New York City has displayed neon signs since 1924.

Neon lighting consists of brightly glowing, electrified glass tubes or bulbs that contain rarefied neon or other gases. Neon lights are a type of cold cathode gas-discharge light. A neon tube is a sealed glass tube with a metal electrode at each end, filled with one of a number of gases at low pressure. A high potential of several thousand volts applied to the electrodes ionizes the gas in the tube, causing it to emit colored light. The color of the light depends on the gas in the tube. Neon lights were named for neon, a noble gas which gives off a popular orange light, but other gases and chemicals called phosphors are used to produce other colors, such as hydrogen (purple-red), helium (yellow or pink), carbon dioxide (white), and mercury (blue). Neon tubes can be fabricated in curving artistic shapes, to form letters or pictures. They are mainly used to make dramatic, multicolored glowing signage for advertising, called neon signs, which were popular from the 1920s to 1960s and again in the 1980s.

The term can also refer to the miniature neon glow lamp, developed in 1917, about seven years after neon tube lighting. While neon tube lights are typically meters long, the neon lamps can be less than one centimeter in length and glow much more dimly than the tube lights. They are still in use as small indicator lights. Through the 1970s, neon glow lamps were widely used for numerical displays in electronics, for small decorative lamps, and as signal processing devices in circuitry. While these lamps are now antiques, the technology of the neon glow lamp developed into contemporary plasma displays and televisions.

Neon was discovered in 1898 by the British scientists William Ramsay and Morris W. Travers. After obtaining pure neon from the atmosphere, they explored its properties using an "electrical gas-discharge" tube that was similar to the tubes used for neon signs today. Georges Claude, a French engineer and inventor, presented neon tube lighting in essentially its modern form at the Paris Motor Show, December 3–18, 1910. Claude, sometimes called "the Edison of France", had a near monopoly on the new technology, which became very popular for signage and displays in the period 1920–1940. Neon lighting was an important cultural phenomenon in the United States in that era; by 1940, the downtowns of nearly every city in the US were bright with neon signage, and Times Square in New York City was known worldwide for its neon extravagances. There were 2,000 shops nationwide designing and fabricating neon signs. The popularity, intricacy, and scale of neon signage for advertising declined in the U.S. following the Second World War (1939–1945), but development continued vigorously in Japan, Iran, and some other countries. In recent decades architects and artists, in addition to sign designers, have again adopted neon tube lighting as a component in their works.

Neon lighting is closely related to fluorescent lighting, which developed about 25 years after neon tube lighting. In fluorescent lights, the light emitted by rarefied gases within a tube is used exclusively to excite fluorescent materials that coat the tube, which then shine with their own colors that become the tube's visible, usually white, glow. Fluorescent coatings (phosphors) and glasses are also an option for neon tube lighting, but are usually selected to obtain bright colors.

== History and science ==
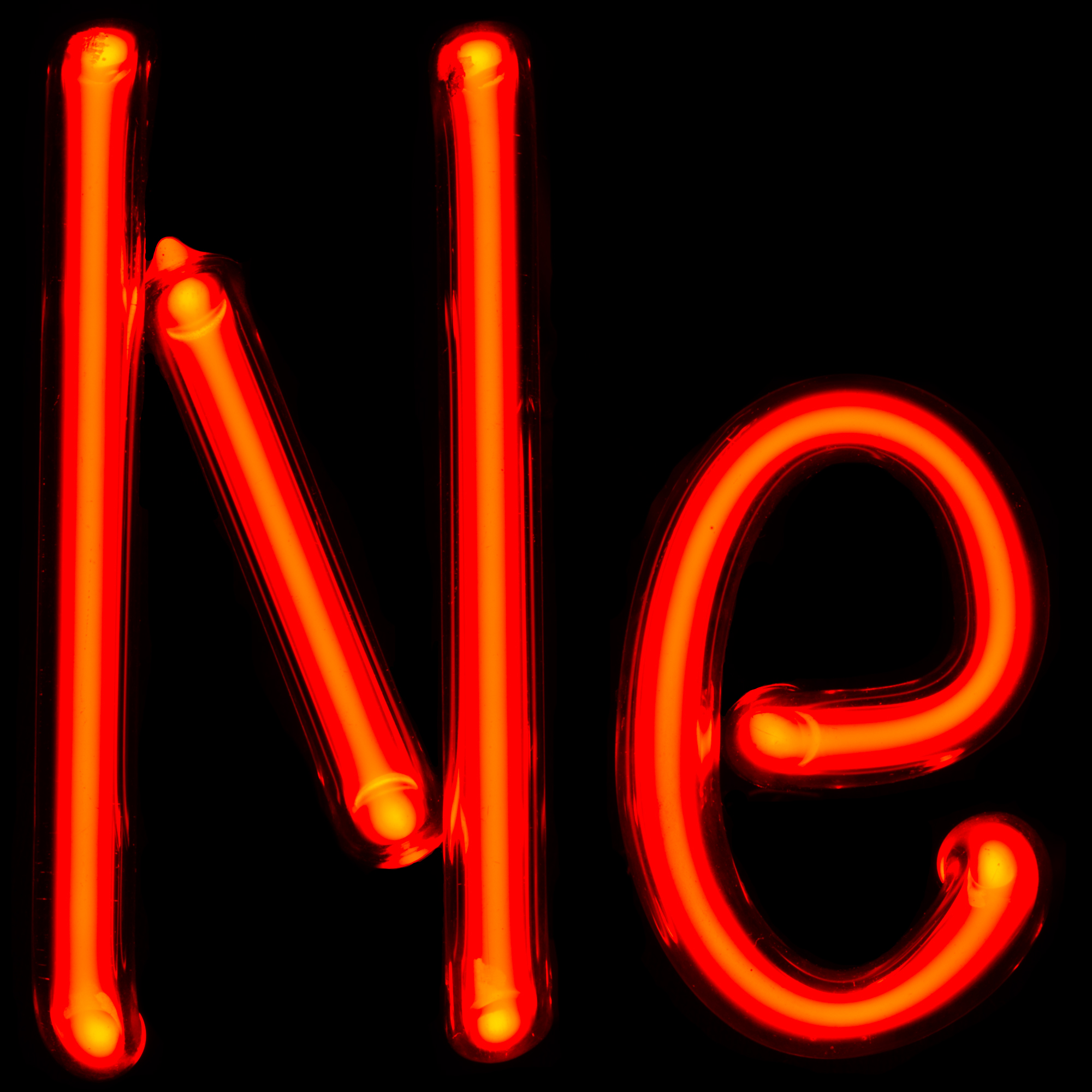
Gas discharge tube containing neon, which was first displayed by Ramsay and Travers; "Ne" is the symbol for neon, one of the chemical elements. This picture is also featured in the book "The Elements: A visual exploration of every known atom in the universe" by Theodore Gray.

Neon is a noble gas chemical element and an inert gas that is a minor component of the Earth's atmosphere. It was discovered in 1898 by the British scientists William Ramsay and Morris W. Travers. When Ramsay and Travers had succeeded in obtaining pure neon from the atmosphere, they explored its properties using an "electrical gas-discharge" tube that was similar to the tubes used today for neon signs. Travers later wrote, "the blaze of crimson light from the tube told its own story and was a sight to dwell upon and never forget." The procedure of examining the colors of the light emitted from gas-discharge (or "Geissler" tubes) was well known at the time, since the colors of light (the "spectral lines") emitted by a gas discharge tube are, effectively, fingerprints that identify the gases inside.

Immediately following neon's discovery, neon tubes were used as scientific instruments and novelties. However, the scarcity of purified neon gas precluded its prompt application for electrical gas-discharge lighting along the lines of Moore tubes, which used more common nitrogen or carbon dioxide as the working gas, and enjoyed some commercial success in the US in the early 1900s. After 1902, Georges Claude's company in France, Air Liquide, began producing industrial quantities of neon as a byproduct of the air liquefaction business. From December 3 to 18, 1910, Claude demonstrated two large (12-metre (39 ft) long), bright red neon tubes at the Paris Motor Show.

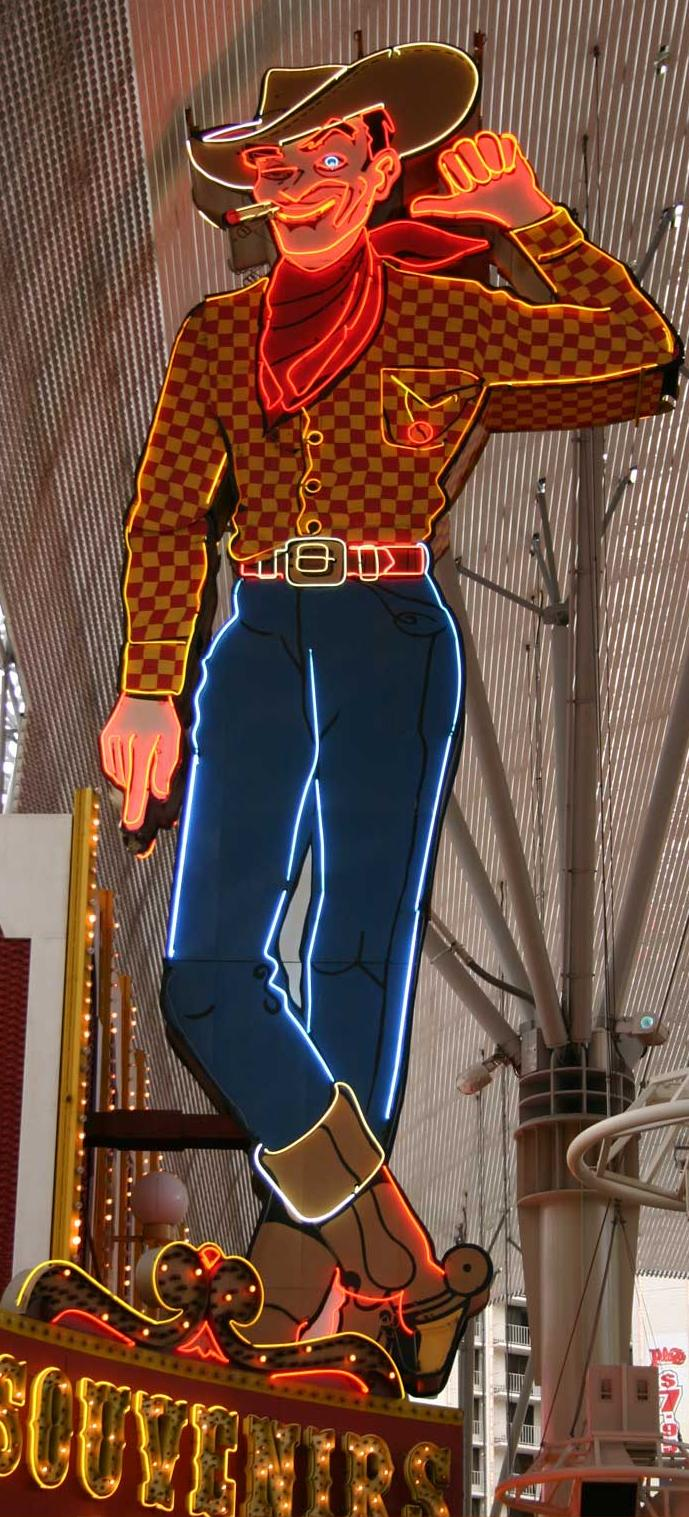
Vegas Vic, a 40-foot (12 m) tall neon sign built in 1951 for the Pioneer Club in Las Vegas, Nevada. The sign, built by the Young Electric Sign Company, shows the elaborate artistic effects that can be achieved.

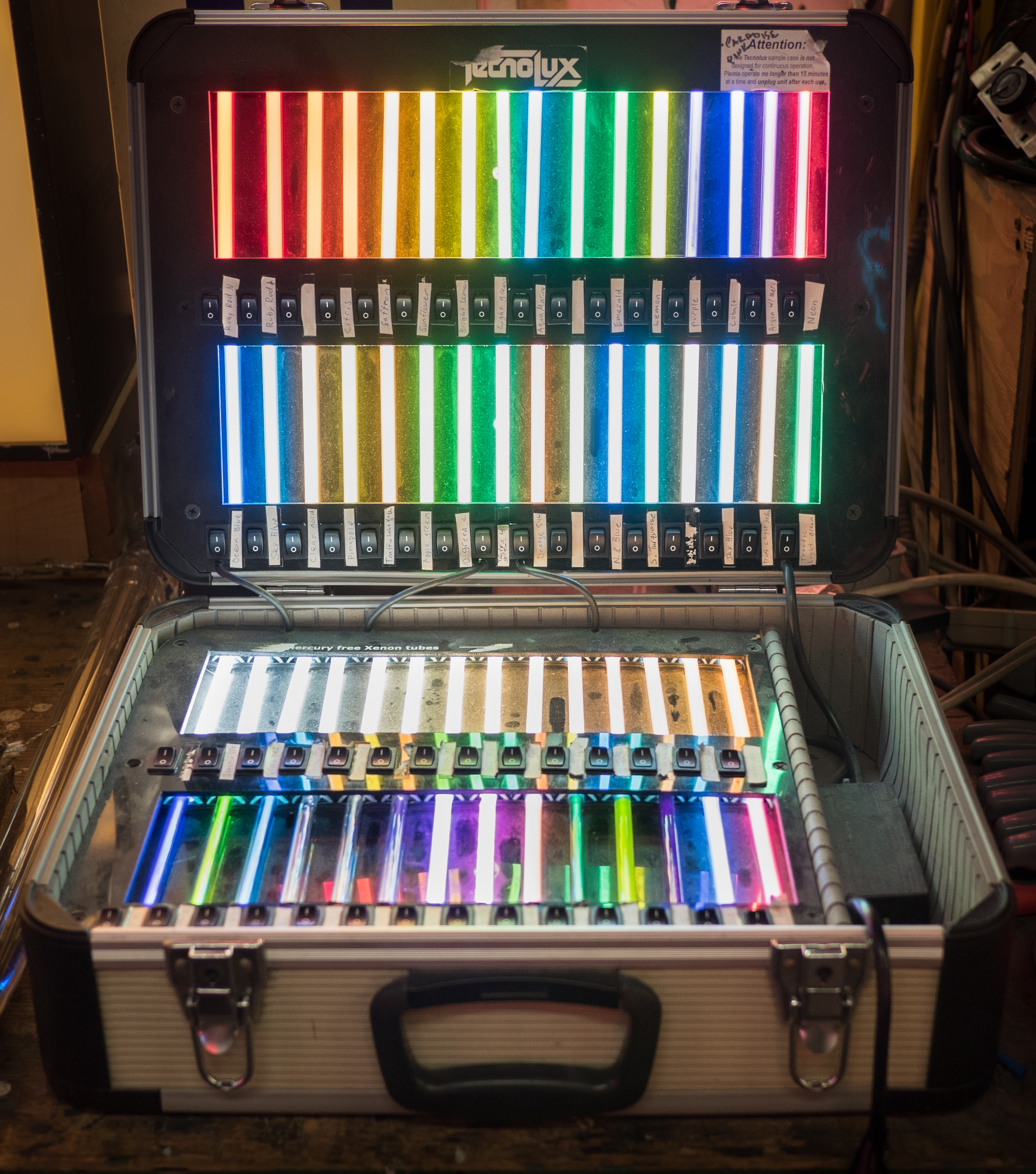
Display of neon lighting samples in a glass studio

These neon tubes were essentially in their contemporary form. The outer diameters for the glass tubing used in neon lighting ranges from 9 to 25 mm; with standard electrical equipment, the tubes can be as long as 30 metres (98 ft). The pressure of the gas inside ranges from 3 to 20 Torr (0.4–3 kPa), which corresponds to a partial vacuum in the tubing. Claude had also solved two technical problems that substantially shortened the working life of neon and some other gas discharge tubes, and effectively gave birth to a neon lighting industry. In 1915, a US patent was issued to Claude covering the design of the electrodes for gas-discharge lighting; this patent became the basis for the monopoly held in the US by his company, Claude Neon Lights, for neon signs through the early 1930s.

Claude's patents envisioned the use of gases such as argon and mercury vapor to create different colors beyond those produced by neon. For instance, mixing metallic mercury with neon gas creates blue. Green can then be achieved using uranium (yellow) glass. White and gold can also be created by adding argon and helium. In the 1920s, fluorescent glasses and coatings were developed to further expand the range of colors and effects for tubes with argon gas or argon-neon mixtures; generally, the fluorescent coatings are used with an argon/mercury-vapor mixture, which emits ultraviolet light that activates the fluorescent coatings. By the 1930s, the colors from combinations of neon tube lights had become satisfactory for some general interior lighting applications, and achieved some success in Europe, but not in the US. Since the 1950s, the development of phosphors for color televisions has created nearly 100 new colors for neon tube lighting.

Around 1917, Daniel McFarlan Moore, then working at the General Electric Company, developed the miniature neon lamp. The glow lamp has a very different design than the much larger neon tubes used for signage; the difference was sufficient that a separate US patent was issued for the lamp in 1919. A Smithsonian Institution website notes, "These small, low power devices use a physical principle called 'coronal discharge'." Moore mounted two electrodes close together in a bulb and added neon or argon gas. The electrodes would glow brightly in red or blue, depending on the gas, and the lamps lasted for years. Since the electrodes could take almost any shape imaginable, a popular application has been fanciful decorative lamps. Glow lamps found practical use as electronic components, and as indicators in instrument panels and in many home appliances until the acceptance of light-emitting diodes (LEDs) starting in the 1970s."

Although some neon lamps themselves are now antiques, and their use in electronics has declined markedly, the technology has continued to develop in artistic and entertainment contexts. Neon lighting technology has been reshaped from long tubes into thin flat panels used for plasma displays and plasma television sets.

== Neon tube lighting and signs ==
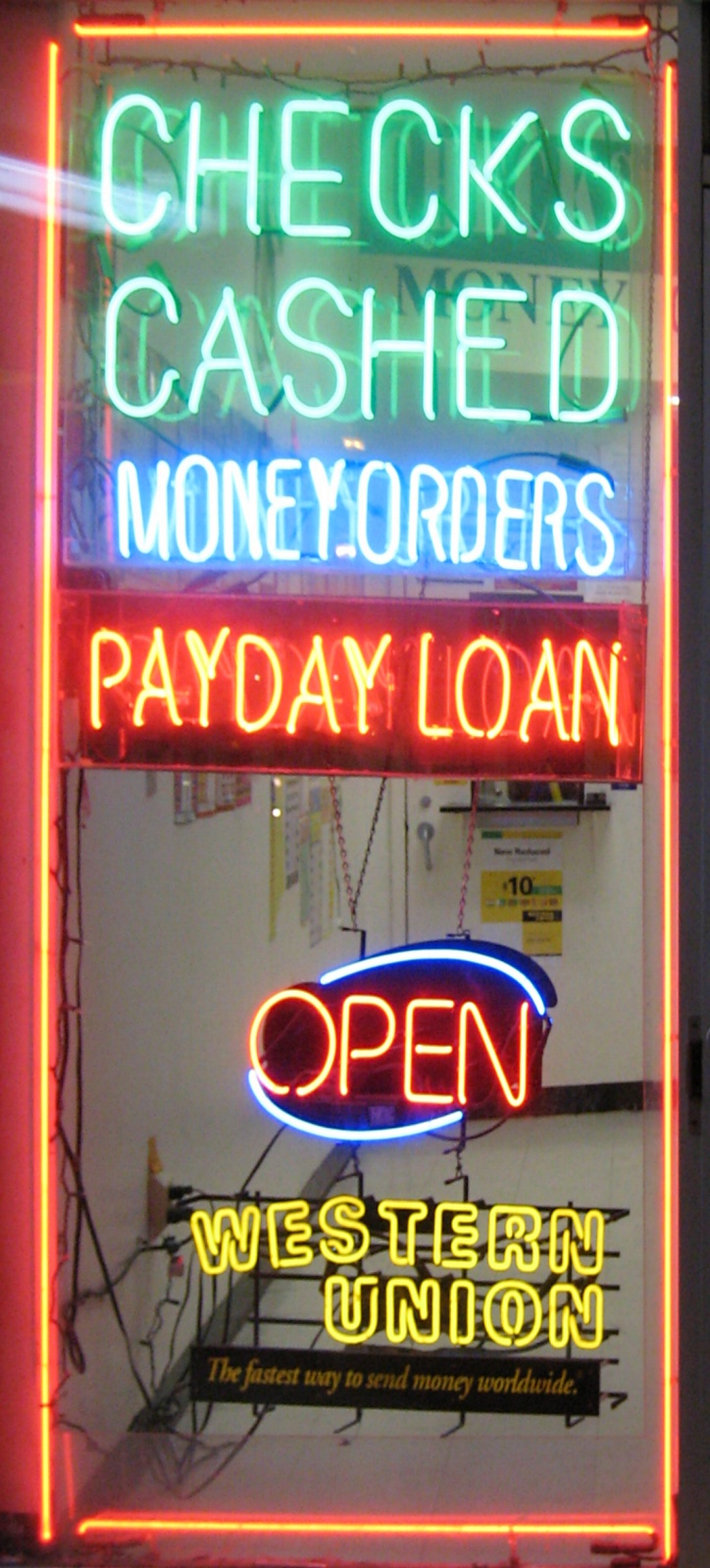
Neon sign in Falls Church, Virginia

When Georges Claude demonstrated an impressive, practical form of neon tube lighting in 1910, he apparently envisioned that it would be used as a form of lighting, which had been the application of the earlier Moore tubes that were based on nitrogen and carbon dioxide discharges. Claude's 1910 demonstration of neon lighting at the Grand Palais (Grand Palace) in Paris lit a peristyle of this large exhibition space. Claude's associate, Jacques Fonseque, realized the possibilities for a business based on signage and advertising. By 1913 a large sign for the vermouth Cinzano illuminated the night sky in Paris, and by 1919 the entrance to the Paris Opera was adorned with neon tube lighting.

Neon signage was received with particular enthusiasm in the United States. In 1923, Earle C. Anthony purchased two neon signs from Claude for his Packard car dealership in Los Angeles, California; these literally stopped traffic. Claude's US patents had secured him a monopoly on neon signage, and following Anthony's success with neon signs, many companies arranged franchises with Claude to manufacture neon signs. In many cases companies were given exclusive licenses for the production of neon signs in a given geographical area; by 1931, the value of the neon sign business was $16.9 million, of which a significant percentage was paid to Claude Neon Lights, Inc. by the franchising arrangements. Claude's principal patent expired in 1932, which led to a great expansion in the production of neon signage. The industry's sales in 1939 were about $22.0 million; the expansion in volume from 1931 to 1939 was much larger than the ratio of sales in the two years suggests.

Rudi Stern has written, "The 1930s were years of great creativity for neon, a period when many design and animation techniques were developed. ... Men like O. J. Gude and, in particular, Douglas Leigh took neon advertising further than Georges Claude and his associates had ever envisioned. Leigh, who conceived and created the archetypal Times Square spectacular, experimented with displays that incorporated smells, fog, and sounds as part of their total effect. ... Much of the visual excitement of Times Square in the thirties was a result of Leigh's genius as a kinetic and luminal artist." Major cities throughout the United States and in several other countries also had elaborate displays of neon signs. Events such as the Chicago Century of Progress Exposition (1933–34), the Paris World's Fair (1937) and New York World's Fair (1939) were remarkable for their extensive use of neon tubes as architectural features. Stern has argued that the creation of "glorious" neon displays for movie theaters led to an association of the two, "One's joy in going to the movies became inseparably associated with neon."

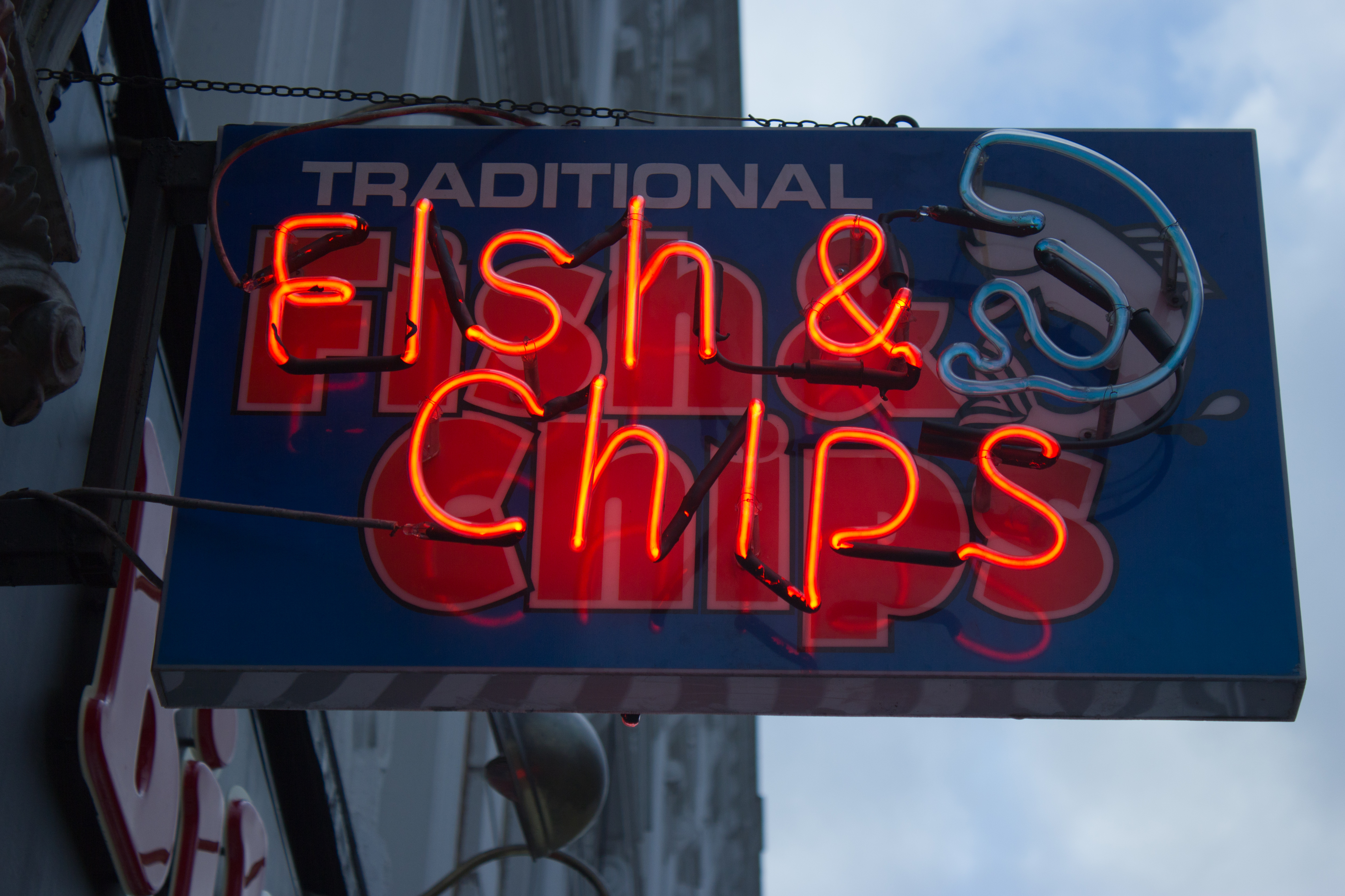
A neon sign for Fish and chips in London, England

The Second World War (1939–1945) arrested new sign installations around most of the world. Following the war, the industry resumed. Marcus Thielen writes of this era, "...after World War II, government programs were established to help re-educate soldiers. The Egani Institute (New York City) was one of few schools in the country that taught neon-trade secrets. The American streamlined design from the 1950s would be unimaginable without the use of neon." The development of Las Vegas, Nevada as a resort city is inextricably linked with neon signage; Tom Wolfe wrote in 1965, "Las Vegas is the only city in the world whose skyline is made neither of buildings, like New York, nor of trees, like Wilbraham, Massachusetts, but signs. One can look at Las Vegas from a mile away on route 91 and see no buildings, no trees, only signs. But such signs! They tower. They revolve, they oscillate, they soar in shapes before which the existing vocabulary of art history is helpless."

Overall, however, neon displays became less fashionable, and some cities discouraged their construction with ordinances. Nelson Algren titled his 1947 collection of short stories The Neon Wilderness (as a synonym of "urban jungle" for Chicago). Margalit Fox has written, "... after World War II, as neon signs were replaced increasingly by fluorescent-lighted plastic, the art of bending colored tubes into sinuous, gas-filled forms began to wane." A Dark Age persisted at least through the 1970s, when artists adopted neon with enthusiasm; in 1979 Rudi Stern published his manifesto, Let There Be Neon. Marcus Thielen wrote in 2005, on the 90th anniversary of the US patent issued to Georges Claude, "The demand for the use of neon and cold cathode in architectural applications is growing, and the introduction of new techniques like fiber optics and LED—into the sign market have strengthened, rather than replaced, neon technology. The evolution of the 'waste' product neon tube remains incomplete 90 years after the patent was filed."

== Neon glow lamps and plasma displays ==
The digits of a Nixie tube, which is a neon glow lamp with ten electrodes shaped as the ten numerals. The digits of this tube are 5/8 in. (16 mm) tall.

In neon glow lamps, the luminous region of the gas is a thin, "negative glow" region immediately adjacent to a negatively charged electrode (or "cathode"); the positively charged electrode ("anode") is quite close to the cathode. These features distinguish glow lamps from the much longer and brighter "positive column" luminous regions in neon tube lighting. The energy dissipation in the lamps when they are glowing is very low (about 0.1 W), hence the distinguishing term cold-cathode lighting.

Some of the applications of neon lamps include:

- Pilot lamps that indicate the presence of electrical power in an appliance or instrument (e.g. an electric coffee pot or power supply).
- Decorative (or "figural") lamps in which the cathode is shaped as a flower, animal, etc.. The figures inside these lamps were typically painted with phosphorescent paints to achieve a variety of colors. A prominent manufacturer of these lamps was the Aerolux Light Corporation.
- Active electronic circuits such as electronic oscillators, timers, memory elements, etc..
- Intricate electronic displays such as the Nixie tube (see photograph).

The small negative glow region of a neon lamp and its adaptable electronic properties led to the use of this technology in early plasma panel displays. In 1964, at the University of Illinois, the first monochrome dot-matrix plasma displays were developed for the PLATO educational system. Inventors Donald L. Bitzer, H. Gene Slottow, and Robert H. Wilson created a display that could retain its state without constant updates. In 2006, Larry F. Weber explained that modern plasma TVs still use key features of these early displays, such as alternating sustain voltage and a neon-based gas mixture. Plasma displays emit ultraviolet light, with each pixel containing phosphors for red, green, or blue light.

== Neon lighting and artists in light ==
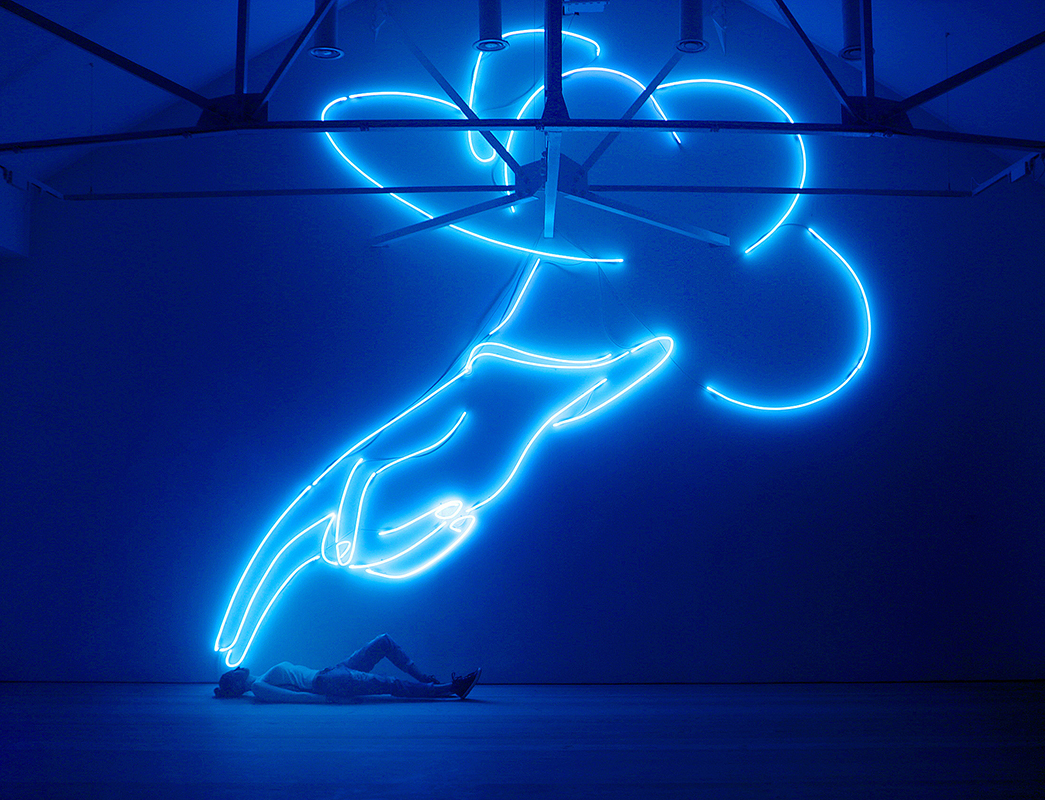
The Blessing Hand, 2013, neon installation by Stepan Ryabchenko at the exhibition Premonition: Ukrainian Art Now in Saatchi Gallery in London.

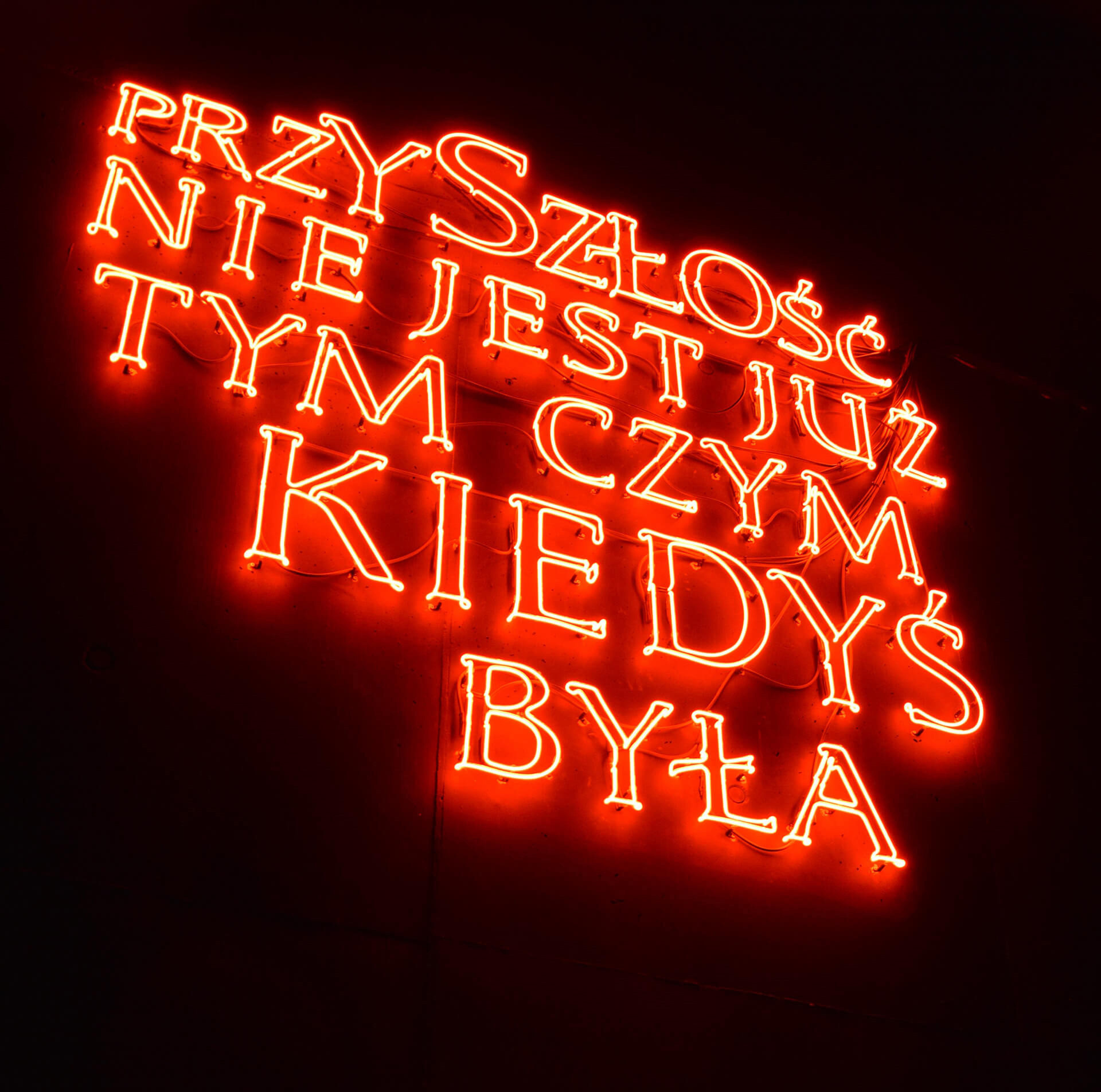
The Future Isn't What It Used to Be, 2015, neon artwork by Hubert Czerepok. The letters form a shape of Poland.

The mid to late 1980s was a period of resurgence in neon production. Sign companies developed a new type of signage called channel lettering, in which individual letters were fashioned from sheet metal.

While the market for neon lighting in outdoor advertising signage has declined since the mid twentieth century, in recent decades neon lighting has been used consciously in art, both in individual objects and integrated into architecture. Frank Popper traces the use of neon lighting as the principal element in artworks to Gyula Košice's late 1940s work in Argentina. Among the later artists whom Popper notes in a brief history of neon lighting in art are Stephen Antonakos, the conceptual artists Billy Apple, Joseph Kosuth, Bruce Nauman, Martial Raysse, Chryssa, Piotr Kowalski, Maurizio Nannucci and François Morellet in addition to Lucio Fontana or Mario Merz.

Several museums in the United States are now devoted to neon lighting and art, including the Museum of Neon Art (founded by neon artist Lili Lakich, Los Angeles, 1981), the Neon Museum (Las Vegas, founded 1996), the American Sign Museum (Cincinnati, founded 1999). These museums restore and display historical signage that was originally designed as advertising, in addition to presenting exhibits of neon art. Several books of photographs have also been published to draw attention to neon lighting as art.

=== List of neon light artists ===
- Billy Apple (1935) New Zealand / USA
- Frida Blumenberg (1935) South Africa
- Chryssa (1933) Greek-American
- Cerith Wyn Evans (1958) Wales
- Michael Flechtner (1951) US
- Michael Hayden (1943) Canada
- Joseph Kosuth (1965) US
- Piotr Kowalski (1927) Poland, France
- Brigitte Kowanz (1957) Austria
- Lili Lakich (1944) US
- Mario Merz (1925) Italy
- Victor Millonzi (1915) US
- Maurizio Nannucci (1939) Italy
- Bruce Nauman (1941) US
- Bill Parker (1950) US - plasma lamp
- Stepan Ryabchenko (1987) Ukraine
- Lisa Schulte (1956) US
- Keith Sonnier (1941) US
- Rudi Stern (1936) US
- Tim White-Sobieski (1961) Poland

== See also ==
- Crackle tube – Type of plasma lamp
- Plasma globe – Decorative electrical device
