= Lesbian Art Project =

Art project in California, US

Lesbian Art Project (1977 – 1979) was a participatory art movement founded by Terry Wolverton and Arlene Raven at the Woman's Building in Los Angeles. The pioneering project focused on giving a platform to lesbian and feminist perspectives of participants through performance, art making, salons, workshops and writing. One significant piece of work created during the project was An Oral Herstory of Lesbianism, in 1979, which documented lesbian women and their feelings, views, experiences, and expression.

The Lesbian Art Project was part of an ongoing effort by Arlene Raven, co-founder of the Woman's Building, to incorporate lesbian-oriented programming into the Feminist Studio Workshop, which had already launched the Los Angeles League for the Advancement of Lesbianism in the Arts (LALALA) in 1975.

Critics and artists influenced by the tenets of postmodernism dismissed much of the art work made in the 1970s from a lesbian feminist perspective. This has resulted in very little being known or written about this pioneering work. The activities and events associated with the Lesbian Art Project at the Woman's Building in Los Angeles have played a larger role in lesbian art history than is often acknowledged. The project began with six women (started by Terry Wolverton) working collectively with a common goal of increasing opportunity for lesbian artists and writing a chapter of lesbian art. This small group disbanded in less than a year but Wolverton and Raven continued in their pursuit of a Lesbian Art Movement. As they continued their project they became astonishingly productive, and they were able to integrate the Lesbian Art Project with the curriculum of the Feminist Studio Workshop at the Woman's Building.

At the Woman's Building they were able to organize a major performance event based on lesbian identities: The Oral Herstory of Lesbianism (Oral). Advertised as "Storytelling, Theater and Magic for Women Only", the project was directed by Wolverton and its stories generated through a workshop for the thirteen performers. The scenes addressed a wide range of issues, including butch and femme identities, incest and sexual abuse, and lesbian stereotypes. Another performance sponsored by the LAP was Terry Wolverton and Ann Shannon's FEMINA: An IntraSpace Voyage (1978), which was created as a response to popular, patriarchal science fiction and is considered to be an example of lesbian feminist camp.

Along with the major performance events, a database for lesbian artists was now in existence. Wolverton and Raven went their separate ways before completing the book they had planned but both continued to individually promote feminist and lesbian art.

A partial successor to the LAP was the 1980 Great American Lesbian Art Show (GALAS), also at the Woman's Building.
