= Louise Fishman =

American artist (1939–2021)

- Born: January 14, 1939; Philadelphia, Pennsylvania, United States
- Died: July 26, 2021 (aged 82); New York City, New York, United States
- Education: Philadelphia College of Art, Pennsylvania Academy of the Fine Arts, Tyler School of Art (BFA, BS), University of Illinois at Urbana–Champaign (MFA)
- Occupation: Painter
- Movement: Abstract

Louise Fishman (January 14, 1939 – July 26, 2021) was an American abstract painter. For many years she lived and worked in New York City, where she died.

== Biography ==
Louise Fishman was born in Philadelphia on January 14, 1939. She was of Ashkenazi Jewish heritage. Her mother and her aunt were artists. She identified as queer and feminist.

Fishman attended the Philadelphia College of Art (now University of the Arts) between 1956 and 1957. In 1958 she attended the Pennsylvania Academy of the Fine Arts in Philadelphia. After being successful at both schools she went on to receive her BFA and BS at the Tyler School of Art (now Tyler School of Art and Architecture) in Elkins Park, Pennsylvania, and in 1965 she secured her MFA from the University of Illinois at Urbana–Champaign.

Following her MFA degree, Fishman worked as a library assistant at the Cooper Hewitt Museum from 1966 to 1968, and also served as an adjunct instructor at the college.

== Artistic career ==
Fishman's painting style at first gave her some trouble in being recognized. She exhibited only occasionally in the 1960s, a period in her life when she produced primarily grid-based work. During the later 1970s her abstract work was linked with Pattern painting. Large scale works like Grand Slam (1985) and Cinnabar and Malachite (1986) reflected her bold visions, and caused many reviewers to label her work as having elements of neo-expressionism.

In 1980 she was one of the ten invited artists whose work was exhibited in the main event of the Great American Lesbian Art Show.

As the feminist movement gained strength in the 1970s, Fishman abandoned her minimalist-inspired, grid-like paintings and began making work that reflected women's traditional tasks. These pieces required the sort of repetitive steps that characterize activities like knitting, piecing, or stitching. Returning later to the masculine realm of abstract painting, Fishman still sought a way to distinguish what she was doing from the work of male artists, both historic and contemporary. The resulting compositions combine gestural brushwork with an orderly structure: it is as if Fishman built or wove—her paintings, starting from a foundation and carefully adding to them, layer upon interlocking layer.

In 1988, Fishman accompanied a friend who survived the Holocaust at both Auschwitz and Theresienstadt. This trip was part of a larger one that took her to Warsaw, Prague, and Budapest. This trip had a dramatic impact on her life as an artist, altered her way of working, and helped her to "investigate her Jewish identity." She returned with ashes, cremated human remains – from Auschwitz. She mixed the ashes with beeswax to use in her paints for the series Remembrance and Renewal. These paintings served as abstract art as well as memorials to a tragic and obscene event in history.

In the early 1990s she returned to painting grids in a slightly altered format. This can be seen in works such as Sipapu (1991) and Shadows and Traces (1992)

The organization of Fishman's work derived ultimately from the grid, which was key 35 years ago, is vestigially apparent though less and less important. Some of the mark-making in the current paintings inclines toward writing, as has been true for around a decade.

In the fall of 2011, Fishman completed her residency at the Emile Harvey Foundation in Venice. She cited her residency in Venice as an important influence on her most recent work. Likewise, the work of Venetian artist Titian was an important inspiration during this period of her work.

== Awards ==
- Senior Art Prize, Tyler School –1963
- Change, Inc. Award –1975
- National Endowment for the Arts Grant – 1975, 1983, 1994
- Guggenheim Fellowship – 1979
- CAPS Fellowship – 1981
- New York Foundation for the Arts Fellowship – 1986
- Adolph & Esther Gottlieb Foundation Grant – 1986
- National Endowment for the Arts, Painting - 1994
- Adolph & Clara Obrig Prize for Painting, National Academy of Design, 177th Annual Exhibition, 5/1st -2002

== Individual exhibitions ==
- 1964 Philadelphia Art Alliance
- 1964 Nancy Hoffman Gallery, New York
- 1967 University of Rhode Island, Kingston
  - John Doyle Gallery, Chicago
- 1977 Nancy Hoffman Gallery, New York
- 1978 Department of State, Washington, D.C.
- 1979 Nancy Hoffman Gallery, New York
  - 855 Mercer, New York
- 1980 Oscarsson-Hood Gallery, New York
- 1982 Oscarsson-Hood Gallery, New York
- 1984 Backerville & Watson Gallery, New York
- 1985 North Carolina Museum of Art, Raleigh, North Carolina
- 1986 Backerville & Watson Gallery, New York
- 1987 Winston Gallery, Washington, D.C.
- 1989 Simon Watson Gallery, New York
  - Lennon, Weinberg, New York
- 1991 Lennon, Weinberg, New York
- 1992 Olin Art Gallery, Kenyon College, Gambier, Ohio
  - Simon Watson Gallery, New York
  - Morris Gallery, Pennsylvania Academy of Fine Arts, Philadelphia
  - Temple Gallery, Tyler School of Fine Arts, Philadelphia
- 1993 Robert Miller Gallery, New York
- 1994 Bianca Lanza Gallery, Miami
- 1995 Robert Miller Gallery, New York
- 1996 Robert Miller Gallery, New York
- 1998 Cheim & Read, New York
- 2000 Paule Anglim, SF
- 2001 Manny Silverman, LA
- 2003 Cheim & Read, New York
- 2004 Manny Silverman, LA
- 2005 Foster Gwin, SF
- 2006 Cheim & Read, New York
- 2007 Dartmouth College, New Hampshire
- 2008 Galerie Kienzle & Gmeiner, Berlin
- 2009 Cheim & Read, New York
- 2009 Museum of Art, Sarasota, FL
- 2009 The John & Mable Ringling
- 2010 Paule Anglim, SF
- 2012 Jack Tilton Gallery, New York
- 2012 John Davis Gallery, Hudson, NY
- 2012 Cheim & Read, New York
- 2013 Goya Contemporary, Baltimore, MD
- 2014 Gallery Nosco, London, UK
- 2015 Cheim & Read, New York
- 2016 Institute of Contemporary Art, Philadelphia
