= Lula Mae Blocton =

American academic

Lula Mae Blocton is an American abstract artist and painter and emeritus professor of East Connecticut State University. A University of Michigan alumna, she is the second Black graduate to receive a fine arts degree from the university. Her work is exhibited throughout the United States and internationally.

== Early life and education ==
Blocton was born 1947 in Ecorse, Michigan. Her parents were children of sharecroppers raised in rural Alabama, near Selma. Lula is one of seven children, and developed a passion for art in elementary and junior high school.

Blocton attended the University of Michigan and became friends with artist Janet Taylor Pickett, who encouraged Blocton to major in art. Blocton graduated in 1969, the second Black student in the university's history to receive a Bachelor of Fine Arts degree. In 1972, she earned an MFA from Indiana University.

== Career ==
Blocton started her career as a junior faculty member at Kean University in New Jersey. At Kean, she participated in the Drawing In Any Media (1973) and Faculty Exhibition (1974) shows.

In the early 1970s, Blocton joined "Black Woman in Visual Perspective," an artist collective that included Eleta Caldwell, Gladys Grader, Adrienne Hoard, Julia Miller, Janet Taylor Pickett, and Nette Forne Thomas.

In the mid-1970s, Blocton was on faculty at SUNY at New Paltz and was included in the Celebrate The Birth Of Women (1976) show and faculty exhibitions (1975 and 1977).

In 1988, Blocton joined the faculty of Eastern Connecticut State University. During her tenure, she created the Art Department, developed and designed the B.A. in Studio Art degree program, and served as chair of the visual arts and fine arts departments.

A world traveller, Blocton was selected as a delegate for People to People, Citizen Ambassador Program of Art Educators which allowed her to travel to Egypt, Israel, and Turkey. In addition, she took academic and research trips to England, France, Holland, Kenya (1997), Peru, and Tanzania (1997).

In 2013, she retired as an emeritus professor of Eastern Connecticut State University.

== Personal life ==
Blocton is married to artist Shirley Bernstein, a relationship that spans more than 50 years. In 2005, Blocton and Bernstein were legally married in Hampton, Connecticut.

== Collections ==
Blocton's work appears in several permanent collections, including the Aldrich Museum of Contemporary Art, Buffalo AKG Art Museum, Columbus Museum of Art, The Connecticut State University System, Eastern Connecticut State University, First Fairview Capital Inc., Indiana University, Prudential Life Insurance Company, and the Schomburg Center for Research in Black Culture.

== Publications ==
Blocton is featured in the monograph, Lula Mae Blocton: African American Experience through Color and Pattern (Palestine Books: 2022). The book was published to coincide with "Lula Mae Blocton, The First Two Decades, 1970-1990," show at Skoto Gallery, New York.

Her work and words have also appeared in: HERESIES: A Feminist Publication on Art and Politics, "to respond to the absence of women-of-color artists in the publication.;" Lesbian Art in America: A Contemporary History, Harmony Hammond, Rizzoli International Publication; African American Woman Artists: A Critical Assessment; The Best of Colored Pencil 2, by Vera Curnow, Rockport Publishers, MA; The Best of Colored Pencil 3, Rockport Publishers, MA; Creative Color Pencil, by Vera Curnow, Rockport Publishers, MA; The Connecticut Review, Published by the Connecticut State University System; Gumbo Ya Ya: Anthology of Contemporary African-American Women Artists, Midmarch Arts Press, NYC; Creative Inspirations, Rockport Publishers, MA; and Best of Colored Pencil 5, Ribbon Self-Portrait, Rockport Publishers, MA.

== Exhibitions ==
=== Solo ===
- Lula Mae Blocton: Twisted Forms, Transparent Bands, 1981–1996. Skoto Gallery, New York, 2023-2024
- Lula Mae Blocton: The Art Show, 2023, "a selection of abstract paintings and drawings from Lula Mae Blocton's Twisted Forms, Transparent Band series, 1981-96," Park Avenue Armory, New York
- Lula Mae Blocton, The First Two Decades, 1970–1990, Skoto Gallery, New York, 2022
- Lula Mae Blocton, Top Shelf Gallery, Fletcher Memorial Library, Eastern Connecticut State University, 2020
- Bands of Light, Lula Mae Blocton, Pegasus Gallery, Middlesex, Community College, Middletown, CT, 2002
- The Pump House Gallery, Black and White Equal Solo Exhibition, Hartford, CT, 1995
- University-Wide Gallery of the Arts, Solo Exhibition, New Britain, 1995
- Lula Mae Blocton, Solo Exhibition, Soho Center for the Visual Artists, New York, NY, 1978
- Lula Mae Blocton, Solo Exhibition, Mahopac, NY, 1987
- MFA Thesis Exhibition, Indiana University, Bloomington, IN, 1972

=== Group ===
- Art after Stonewall, 1969 –1989, a major exhibition documenting the Stonewall riots' visual impact on the LGBTQ movement. The travelling show was presented at Grey Art Gallery, New York University (2019); Leslie-Lohman Museum of Gay and Lesbian Art (2019); The Patricia & Phillip Frost Art Museum FIU in Miami (2019–2020), and the Columbus Museum of Art (2020).
- Hoping for Clear Skies, Margaret Thatcher Projects, New York, NY, 2017
- 1970's: 9 Women and Abstraction, Curated by Barbara Stehle, Zurcher Gallery, New York, NY, 2016
- Art Connections 11, Featured Artist, George Segal Gallery, Montclair State University, Montclair, NJ, 2015
- Lesbian Herstory Archives' 40th Anniversary, Johannes Vogt Gallery, West 26th Street, New York, NY, 2013
- Forget-Me-Nots, Hygienic Art Galleries, New London, CT, 2011
- Hidden in Plain Sight, Black Women in Visual Perspective, 35th Anniversary Exhibit, Maplewood Arts Center, Maplewood, NJ, 2010
- Heritage Patterns, Langston Hughes Community Library and Cultural Center, Queens, NY, 2008
- (an)Other Show, Selected works by Artists of Color from Connecticut State University Faculty, New Britain, CT, 2008
- Building Consensus, ECSU Visual Arts Department Faculty Exhibition, Akus Gallery, Willimantic, CT, 2008
- Invitational, Signature Showcase, The Cornell Museum of Art and Art History, Delray Beach, FL, 2006
- That's A Whole 'Notha Story, Art in the Atrium, Morristown, NJ, 2006
- 62nd Annual Connecticut Artists Exhibition, The Slater Memorial Museum, CPSA, 2005
- 12th International Juried Exhibition, The Jay Etkin Gallery, Memphis, TN, 2005
- That's A Whole 'Notha Story, Art in the Atrium, Morristown, NJ, 2004
- Invitational, Mirror Mirror; Self Portrait, Self Image, The William Benton Museum of Art, Storrs, CT, 2004
- Drawing and Graphics 2003, International Exhibition, The Stage Gallery, Merrick, NY, 2003
- Contemporary Art influenced by African Culture, The Illinois Institute of Art Chicago, Chicago, IL, 2003
- Connecticut Academy of Fine Arts 91st Annual Exhibition, Mystic Art, Association Gallery, Mystic, CT, 2002
- Connecticut Academy of Fine Arts 90th Annual Exhibition, The Slater Memorial Museum, Norwich, CT, 2001
- Drawings on Life, Lula Mae Blocton, Quinebaug Valley Community College, Danielson, CT, 2001
- CSU Faculty Art Exhibition, Ruth Haas Library, Western Connecticut State University, Danbury, CT, 2001
- CSU Faculty Exhibition, J. Eugene Smith Library, Willimantic, CT, 2000
- Color Passages, The Promenade Gallery at the Bushnell, Hartford, CT, 1999
- CSU Faculty Exhibition, New Library, ECSU, Willimantic, CT, 1998
- 5th Colored Pencil Society of America (CPSA) International Exhibition, Chicago, IL, 1997
- 68th Annual Connecticut Women Artists Juried Show, West Hartford, CT, 1997
- Connecticut Academy of Fine Arts 85th Annual Juried Show, Hartford, CT, 1996
- ADA: Women and Information Technology, Artemisia Gallery, Chicago, IL, 1996
- CSU Faculty Exhibition, Chen Art Center, New Britain, CT, 1996
- International Colored Pencil Exhibition, Art At The Powerhouse, Cleveland, 1995
- The World's Women On-Line! Video/Internet Gallery, An interactive electronic network of images by women artists globally, Computing Commons Gallery, Arizona State University, Tempe, AZ, 1995
- United Nations' Fourth World Conference on Women in Beijing, China, 1995
- CTCSU Faculty Exhibition, Chen Art Center, CCSU, New Britain, CT, 1995
- Back to the Motherland: Exploring the African Diaspora, QVCTC, Danielson, CT, 1995
- Beyond Africa: Cultural Influences in American Art, Juried Show, Greensboro, NC, 1994
- Through the Eyes of Our Sisters, Invitational, CRT's Craftery Gallery, Hartford, CT, 1994
- States of the Art: National Juried Show of Women Artists, Curated by Lowery Stokes Sims, Celebrating the 21st Anniversary of AIR Gallery, New York, NY, 1993
- Connecticut Academy of Fine Arts 82nd Annual Juried Exhibition, The Slater Memorial Museum, Norwich, CT, 1993
- International Juried Colored Pencil Exhibition, Seattle, WA, 1993
- Faculty Exhibition, Akus Gallery, ECSU, Willimantic, CT, 1993
- And This is Now, Black Art In The 1990s, Juried Traveling Exhibition, Samuel S. T. Chen Art Center, CCSU, (New Britain, CT) and CRT's Craftery Gallery and The Legislative Office Building (Hartford, CT), 1992
- Artworks, Juried National Exhibition, Hartford, CT, 1991
- Wimminfest Invitational, Jonson Gallery at the University of New Mexico, 1991
- 3rd Annual CSU Art Faculty Exhibition, CCSU, New Britain, CT, 1991
- 5th Annual Women in the Visual Arts National Juried Exhibition, New Haven, CT, 1991
- Drawing 1990 National Juried Exhibition, Larsen Gallery at Brigham, Young University, Provo, UT, 1990
- American Drawing Biennial II National Juried Exhibition, Muscarelle Museum of Art, College of William and Mary, Williamsburg, VA, 1990
- Annual Faculty Exhibition, Akus Gallery, ECSU, Willimantic, CT, 1989
- Workshop Artist Show, Mahopac, NY, 1986
- Group Exhibition, Two Steps Down Gallery, Brooklyn, NY, 1983
- Heresies Benefit, Group Exhibition, Frank Marino Gallery, New York, NY, 1982
- Fragments of Myself/The Women, Douglas College Art Gallery at Rutgers University, New Brunswick, NJ, 1981
- Group Exhibition, Yolisa House Gallery, New York, NY, 1981
- Third Wave Group Exhibition, Hibbs Gallery, New York, NY, 1981
- Heresies Benefit, Group Exhibition, Frank Marino Gallery, New York, NY 1981
- "Great American Lesbian Art Show," The Women's Building, Los Angeles, California, 1979
- Soho 20 Invitational, New York, NY, 1978
- Postcard Size International Traveling Exhibition, Arte Giera in Bologna, Italy, 1978
- Women Artists '78, Graduate Center City University of New York, NY, 1978
- Faculty Exhibition, SUNY at New Paltz, NY, 1977
- Fourteen Women Artists, Anderson Gallery at Virginia Commonwealth University, Richmond, VA, 1977
- Perspectives On The Black Experience, Indiana University, Bloomington IN, 1977
- Celebrate The Birth Of Women, SUNY at New Paltz, NY, 1976
- Salute to '76, Gallery Group Exhibition, Martha Jackson Gallery, New York, NY, 1976
- Painting Faculty Exhibition, SUNY at New Paltz, NY, 1975
- Invitational Studio 81, Jersey City, NJ, 1974
- Faculty Exhibition, Kean College of New Jersey, Union, NJ, 1974
- Black Women in Visual Perspectives, Newark, NJ, 1973
- Drawing In Any Media, Kean College of New Jersey, Union, NJ, 1973
- Black Art Educator's Painting Exhibit, Indiana University Museum, Bloomington, IN, 1972
