= Giuseppe Gabellone =

Italian artist (born 1973)

- Born: 1973 (age 52–53); Brindisi, Italy

Giuseppe Gabellone (born 1973) is an Italian artist who works in sculpture and photography. He lives and works in Paris.

== Biography ==
Gabellone was born in Brindisi, Apulia, in 1973. From 1995 he attended the Accademia di Belle Arti di Brera in Milan. He had his first solo show in Milan in 1996 at Studio Guenzani.

Gabellone's work is characterised by strict formal research and constant experimentation with different mediums and their idioms and materials, resulting in an analytic reflection on the use of space. Initially known for his practice is the production of photography of sculptures, since the beginning of the 2000s, Gabellone has been investigating different types of wall sculpture, reinterpreting traditional Italian wall relief.

Gabellone’s work has been exhibited in many international institutions including Fondazione Sandretto Re Rebaudengo, Turin (2019 and 2000); Fondazione Prada, Milan (2018); the Triennale di Milano (2015); GAMeC, Bergamo (2013); Palais de Tokyo, Paris (2013); Museum of Contemporary Art, Chicago (2008); Galleria d’Arte Moderna, Bologna (2005); Kunsthalle Wien, Vienna (2004); Hara Museum, Tokyo (2001); Centre Pompidou, Paris (2001); Castello di Rivoli, Turin (2000); Stedelijk Museum voor Actuele Kunst, Gent (2000). He also participated to the Rome Quadriennale (2020–21); Venice Biennale (1997, 2003), Biennale of Sydney (1998); and Documenta, Kassel (2002).
