= Lisa Schulte (artist) =

American artist (born 1956)

- Born: 1956 (age 69–70); Long Island, New York
- Known for: Neon sculpture
- Movement: Board Member for the Museum of Neon Art

Lisa Schulte (born 1956) is an American artist, also known as "The Neon Queen", who is best known for her work in expressive neon sculpture. Schulte started bending neon in the early 1980s, creating custom neon signs and neon prop rentals to the entertainment industry under her Los Angeles-based neon studio, Nights of Neon. She is recognized for working with light as an artist and designer, and owner of one of the largest neon collections in the world.

== Early life ==
Schulte was born in Long Island, New York. At the age of 7, she was shot in the eye and lost her sight for 3 months which was a significant moment in her childhood that changed her sense of light.

== Career ==
Schulte began her career in working with light when she was 17 operating light boards in nightclubs. In 1984, a production company selected Schulte to design a futuristic installation at the Pacific Design Center for the 1984 Summer Olympics held in Los Angeles that year.

During the 2008 financial crisis, Schulte decided to create her own business and started the Nights of Neon, a 25,000-square-foot studio in Los Angeles that followed with group shows, solo shows and museum exhibitions.

In 2010, Schulte decided to dedicate her time as a fine artist working in neon sculpture with dimensional light forms. Her earliest artistic works stemmed from her background in neon signage. Her first exhibition was in 2010 at the Church Gallery in Santa Barbara, California. Schulte began experimenting with abstract forms, neon sculptures reminiscent of the Spirograph drawing toy on metal developed by British engineer Denys Fisher in the 1960s.

In 2014, she had her first solo exhibition at the Hinge Modern Gallery in Culver City, California and presented her work at Los Angeles County Museum of Art in Journey Of A Dress: Diane Von Furstenberg exhibition. In the same year, her forms evolved to using organic materials, creating large three-dimensional sculptures with driftwood which she premiered at the Lancaster Museum of Art and History (MOAH).

In 2015, she was signed by Volkz Clark Gallery in New York and represented the gallery at Pulse Miami later that year. In 2016, Schulte's work was featured on the cover of Gotham Magazine. Schulte served as board member for the Museum of Neon Art in Glendale, California. Schulte is currently represented by the Voltz Clarke Gallery in New York City and Samuel Lynne Galleries in Dallas, Texas.

In 2017, Schulte and Brendan Donnelly collaborated at Grand Central Market to create a Bulleit Frontier Whiskey neon art sign as part of a fundraising campaign for the Museum of Neon Art. In the same year, the Cut announced that Schulte has between 10,000 and 20,000 pieces in her personal collection. In 2018, Los Angeles magazine named Schulte as a local legend of the craft.

During her career, Lisa's work has been featured with artists like Jennifer Lopez, worked with artists like Veronica Swanson Beard, bands such as Backstreet Boys, and has worked with brands such as Bulleit and Karma Automotive.

== Artistic works ==
=== A Conversation ===
In 2013, at the Museum of Neon Art, Schulte created A Conversation, "a 10- by 20-foot wall of emojis, following a distinct conversation using only hugs, smiles, hearts and many more symbols that seem to have replaced conversation as we knew it, before social media." according to San Pedro's Random Lengths News.

=== Collaboration with Cleon Peterson ===
This two-part work with Cleon Peterson is a depiction of brutality and aggression, finding uncomfortable truths in the violence of the everyday. Black and white figures act out stabbings, tangled in moments of police brutality, the writhing bodies recall classic Greco-Roman wrestlers.

=== Wood Series ===
Schulte broke new creative ground by making organic light sculptures that combine found driftwood from the coast of California with intricately woven beams white neon light.

== Selected works ==
- All Lit Up, Chinatown, Los Angeles — 2018
- i Live in Denial — 2016
- Memories of Rotating Emotions, Museum of Neon Art — 2015
- Do More — 2015
- A Conversation, Museum of Neon Art — 2013
- Light Encounters, Museum of Riverside — 2019
