= Frida Blumenberg =

Visual artist and sculptor

- Born: 1935, May,24
- Citizenship: South Africa
- Occupations: Visual artist, Sculptor

Frida Blumenberg (born May 24, 1935) is a South African visual artist and sculptor working primarily in neon, acrylic, and bronze.

Born in Durban, South Africa to Swedish parents, she was educated as a sculptor, painter, and goldsmith in London, where she had several solo exhibitions at the Institute of Contemporary Art. In 1960 at the age of 25, she completed a mosaic mural for the Durban Maritime Terminal that, at the time, was the largest mosaic mural in the Southern Hemisphere. In 1965, she was one of six artist-jewelers who represented Great Britain in the Bavarian Government Special Show in Munich, Germany in the exhibition titled "Jewelry as Sculpture." Her work has been exhibited in museums and galleries in England, Canada, Ireland, Germany, the Netherlands, South Africa, and in America at the Institute of Contemporary Art (Boston), the National Museum of Women in the Arts (Washington, D.C.), the Denver Art Museum, the Dallas Museum of Art, and the Houston Museum of Art, among others. In group exhibitions, she has shown with Picasso, Alexander Calder, and Louise Nevelson. Her work is also featured in many corporate collections including those of Shell, Alcon/Nestlé, Canadian Pacific Railways, and Texas American Banks.
