= Lili Lakich =

American artist (born 1944)

- Lakich in 1982
- Born: Liliana Diane Lakich; June 4, 1944 (age 82); Washington, D.C.
- Education: London School of Film Technique, Pratt Institute
- Known for: Neon sculpture
- Movement: First director for the Museum of Neon Art

Liliana Diane Lakich (born June 4, 1944) is an American artist, best known for her work in neon sculpture. As a child, she had been fascinated by neon advertising, and she built her career around illuminated art, with its special emotional power. Lakich has received many private and public art commissions, in one case assisting the city of Los Angeles in a street-lighting project. She also co-founded the Museum of Neon Art (MONA), the first specialist collection of art in electric media. Her sculptures have been featured in major publications on contemporary sculpture.

== Early life ==
Lakich was born in Washington, D.C., but soon moved to Tucson, Arizona when her father's military career transferred the family to Davis Monthan Air Base and then to California when he was sent to the Korean War. They went on frequent road trips where she was exposed to roadside neon signs.

My family was into road trips…[o]ur idea of recreation was to get in the car and drive on a weekend. So we would pick the motel by which one had the best neon sign.

— Lakich in interview with Curve, 2002.

"When my father returned from the Korea," she recalls, "the first thing he did was buy a brand new, light-blue Chrysler. We drove all over the United States, visiting relatives and old friends from California to Florida. By day we read all the clever Burma Shave signs and stopped at every souvenir shop or roadside attraction that was made to look like a wigwam, teapot or giant hamburger, but it was driving at night that I loved best. It was then that the darkness would come alive with brightly colored images of cowboys twirling lassos atop rearing palominos, sinuous Indians shooting bows and arrows, or huge trucks in the sky with their wheels of light spinning. These were the neon signs attempting to lure motorists to stop at a particular motel or truck-stop diner. We stopped, but it was always the neon signs that I remembered."

She attended six 5th grades and three high schools in the U.S. and Germany (her father was now stationed in Frankfurt). After graduating from high school near Fort Meade, Maryland (between Baltimore and Washington, D.C.), she went to college at Pratt Institute in Brooklyn, New York. Dissatisfied with the traditional painting, printmaking and sculpture classes that were offered, she left Pratt after her second year to attend the London School of Film Technique in London, England. Film making proved to be too much of a group activity, so she returned to Pratt and earned a Bachelor Fine Arts degree in 1967.

While at Pratt, a devastating personal relationship led her to create her first light sculpture, a self-portrait with tiny light bulbs controlled by a motor, blinking down her face like tears. "This was my first electric work of art," she says, "and for the first time in my life, I felt that I had really and absolutely expressed myself. For me, art is cathartic—-a means of packaging emotion and exorcising it. Once I had made a portrait of myself crying, I could stop crying. The sculpture cried for me. If you can express mangled feelings in a work of art, you can overpower them. They then exist as a set of lines, colors and forms. They're no longer an amorphous nausea eating away at your gut. They're incorporated into an object. You can see it. You can hang it on a wall. And if you can make it beautiful, you can somehow feel that it has sanctity...that it is an icon capable of arousing an emotional response in other people as well."

== Career ==
After graduating from Pratt Institute, Lakich moved to San Francisco briefly before settling in Los Angeles in 1968. "When I was in San Francisco, I didn't have a single idea. The city was too Victorian for me. When I came to Los Angeles with all its lights and visual clutter, I suddenly had lots of ideas."

Lakich began exhibiting neon sculpture in 1973 at Gallery 707 on La Cienega Blvd. Her first solo exhibition, at Womanspace in The Woman's Building in 1974, garnered a review in Artforum magazine by Peter Plagens where he commented "...the whole show is solid, however, I doubt whether Lakich will confine her development to static, confined neon, if for no other reason than the recent liberation of electric lights through Process, video, and performance art." (Boy, was he wrong. Thirty years later, Lakich has become one of the premier artists in the world working in illuminated sculpture).

In 1980 Lakich was one of the ten invited artists whose work was exhibited in the Great American Lesbian Art Show at the Woman's Building. From 1982, Lakich founded and served as first director for the Museum of Neon Art in Los Angeles, remaining there until 1999. In 1986 she authored Neon Lovers Glow in the Dark and in 2007 LAKICH: For Light. For Love. For Life.

Her sculptures have been included in major publications on contemporary sculpture, neon sculpture and feminist art including Signs, and in many private and corporate collections. She has had solo shows in Tokyo, Paris and Los Angeles.

== Artistic works ==
In 1984, Drive-In was created by Lakich after she was commissioned by Unity Savings for their new Beverly Hills office. At the corner of Wilshire and La Cienega Boulevards (known as "Restaurant Row"), it was located on the former site of Dolores Restaurant, famous for being one of the original drive-in restaurants in Los Angeles. Dolores had been torn down against the will of its owner and long-term patrons and was replaced by a large office building. Unity Savings happened to be one of the tenants. Because a savings and loan relies on the support of local residents and businesses, Lakich thought it would be exciting and appropriate to create a tribute to Dolores Restaurant.

Lakich created the L.A. Angel in 1992 on the West wall of 300 block of South Olive with the intention to serve a practical problem for the city of Los Angeles. When California Plaza on Bunker Hiss was extended, it created a dark, tunnel-like effect along the 300 block of South Olive. It was decided by the developer to install a light sculpture to meet the City's lighting standards and worked with the Museum of Neon Art in 1989 to commission $75,000 to a woman artist to complete the work. The piece is constructed of lightweight honeycomb aluminum sheets in an abstracted human shape with streaks of neon lights incorporated. It is meant to represent the culture, industry and character of the city of Los Angeles while speaking to the past and present of the city.

A few years later, Lakich was commissioned a to create a sculpture in a multi-million dollar home in the hills of Santa Ana. The artist presented four different concepts for the project, but it was this one that intrigued Mrs. Freed as her husband is a therapist. Lakich initially built out the work of inch-thick gator foam and took it to the site to test the scale. She then used honeycomb aluminum supported by a steel structure to realize the work. In 1995, Tell Me About Yourself intrigues many people as it is unusual to see a neon sculpture in an outdoor residential setting. But it has proved popular with the couple's guests, and it delights them that when coming home from an airplane trip they can spot it from the sky on the ground below.

In 2009, she completed the 114-ft public art commission, Flyaway in 2009 for the Van Nuys FlyAway Bus Terminal at 7610 Woodley Ave. in Van Nuys. This sculpture constructed of honeycomb aluminum and contains two figures: Pegasus connected to abstracted flying human figure with streaks of neon lighting and argon tubing.

== Selected works ==
- Blessed Oblivion (1975), Museum of Neon Art
- Where the Eagle Flies (1990), lobby of the Washington Building, Los Angeles
- Drive-In, (1984) Unity Savings, Beverly Hills, CA
- L.A. Angel (1992), 300 block of South Olive, Los Angeles
- TELL ME ABOUT YOURSELF (1995) Commissioned by Evelyn and Frank Freed, Santa Ana, California
- Guardian, Miller Children's Hospital at Long Beach Memorial Medical Center
- Buddha, Museum of Neon Art
- Flyaway (2009), Van Nuys FlyAway Bus Terminal, Los Angeles

== Bibliography ==
- Lakich, Lili (1986). Neon Lovers Glow in the Dark. Los Angeles: Museum of Neon Art. ISBN 978-0-87905-419-9.
- Swan, Sheila; Lakich, Lili (1994). Neon Nevada. Reno: University of Nevada Press. ISBN 978-0-87417-246-1.
- Lakich, Lili (2007). Lakich: For Light. For Love. For Life. City: Lili Lakich Studio. ISBN 978-0-615-13351-5.
