= Robert I. Millonzi =

American lawyer

Robert I. Millonzi (1910–1986) was an American lawyer and member of the Securities and Exchange Commission under President Harry S. Truman. He was a member of the 1967 U.S. delegation to the United Nations Economic and Social Council. He was the brother of American artist Victor Millonzi.

As a partner in the Buffalo law firm Diebold & Millonzi, he was nominated by President Truman in June 1951 to the Securities and Exchange Commission to replace Commissioner Edward McCormick, who had resigned to head the New York Curb Exchange. Millonzi was confirmed by the U.S. Senate and sworn in as an S.E.C. commissioner on June 21, 1951 to complete a term which ended on June 5, 1952, at which time Millonzi resigned, expressing a desire to return to his law firm in Buffalo.

Millonzi used his influence to support the performing arts. He served on the executive committee of the Buffalo Philharmonic Orchestral Society. In February 1967 U.S. President Lyndon Johnson appointed him to the board of trustees of the John F. Kennedy Center for the Performing Arts.

Millonzi was appointed by New York Governor Mario Cuomo in July 1983 to chair a commission to study the distribution of inexpensive hydroelectric power in the state as contracts for power from the Niagara and St. Lawrence-Franklin D. Roosevelt Power Projects expired. Under his leadership, the commission recommended on February 29, 1984, a re-allocation of a portion of that power from upstate New York to homes and businesses downstate, and to reserve power for businesses to help create jobs. The New York Legislature deferred action on these recommendations following a ruling by the United States Court of Appeals for the Second Circuit which allowed the existing contracts with private upstate utilities to continue until they expired in 1990.
