= Victor Millonzi =

Victor Millonzi (December 17, 1915 – 1997) was an American painter and sculptor best known for his work in neon sculpture. His work can be found in the Smithsonian American Art Museum, The Corcoran Gallery of Art, the Albright-Knox Art Gallery, and in several other collections. He is also the brother of Robert I. Millonzi.
