= Maurizio Nannucci =

Italian artist (born 1939)

Maurizio Nannucci (born 1939, in Florence, Italy) is an Italian contemporary artist. Lives and works in Florence and South Baden, Germany. Nannucci's work includes: photography, video, neon installations, sound installation, artist's books, and editions. Since the mid-sixties he is a protagonist of international artistic experimentation in Concrete Poetry and Conceptual Art.

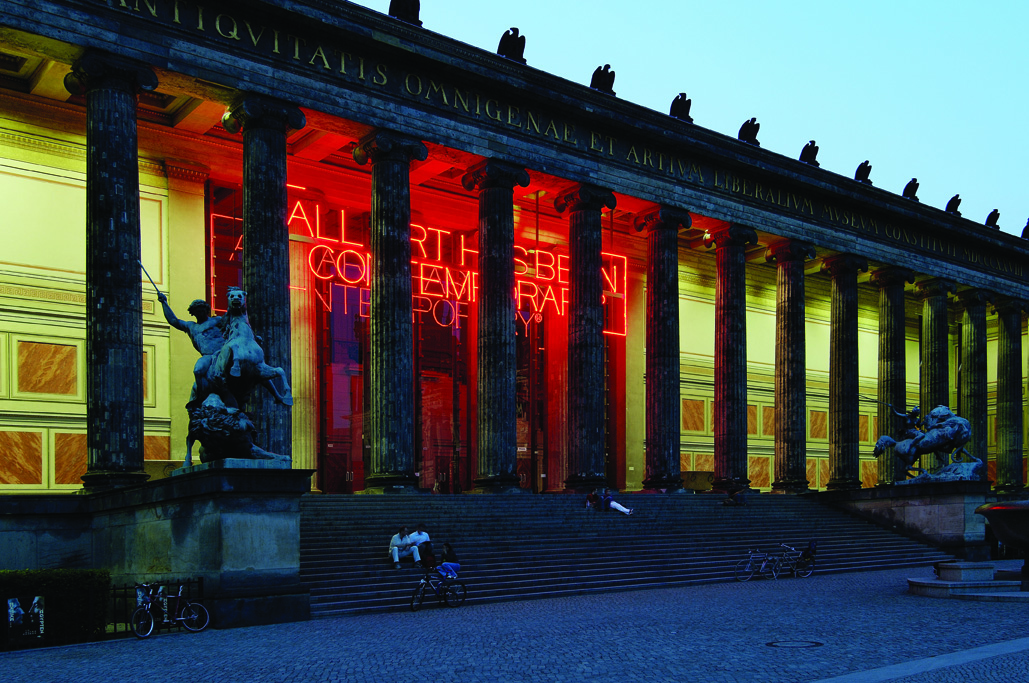
Maurizio Nannucci, All Art Has Been Contemporary, 1999/2000, neon lights. Altes Museum, Berlin

== Biography ==
Maurizio Nannucci was born in Florence on April 20, 1939. After studying at the Academy of Fine Arts in Florence and Berlin, he attended electronic music courses and worked for several years with experimental theater groups, drawing sceneries. In 1968 he founded the Exempla publishing house and the Zona Archives Edizioni in Florence, still playing an intense editorial activity by publishing artist's books and records, multiple copies and other artists' records.

From 1974 to 1985 he was part of the non-profit space Zona in Florence, organizing over two hundred exhibitions and events. In 1981 he created Zona Radio, a radio station dedicated to artists' sound work and experimental music, and in 1998 founded together with Paolo Parisi, Massimo Nannucci, Carlo Guaita, Paolo Masi and Antonio Catelani, Base / Progetti per l'arte, a nonprofit space of artists for other artists. Since the mid-1960s, he explored the relationship between art, language and image, between light-colour and space, creating unprecedented conceptual ideas, characterized by the use of different media: neon, photography, video, sound, editions and artist's books.

From 1967 are the first neon works that bring to his work a more diverse dimension of meaning and a new perception of space. Since then, Nannucci's research has always been focused in an interdisciplinary dialogue between work, architecture and urban landscape, as demonstrated by collaborations with Renzo Piano, Massimiliano Fuksas, Mario Botta, Nicolas Grimshaw and Stephan Braunfels. He has participated several times at the Venice Biennale, Documenta in Kassel and the Biennales of São Paulo, Sydney, Istanbul, Valencia, and has exhibited in the most important museums and galleries all over the world.

Among his neon installations in public places and institutions it is worth mentioning: Carpenter Center, Harvard University, Cambridge; Auditorium Parco della Musica, Roma; Bibliothek des Deutschen Bundestages e Altes Museum, Berlino; Kunsthalle, Vienna; Lenbachhaus München; Villa Arson, Nizza; Fondazione Peggy Guggenheim, Venezia; Mamco, Ginevra; Galleria d’arte moderna, Torino; Hubbrücke, Magdeburgo; Galleria degli Uffizi, Firenze; Museum of Fine Arts, Boston; Maxxi, Roma. Several the recent installations of Nannucci in public spaces in Milano: from the large “And what about the truth” at the Triennale (2006) to “No more excuses”, realizes for the Expo 2015 on the façade of the Refettorio Ambrosiano in Piazzale Greco. Recent exhibitions include: “Anni Settanta”, at the Triennale in Milano (2007); “Fuori! Arte e Spazio Urbano 1968/1976”, at the Museo del Novecento (2011); “Ennesima”, at the Triennale (2016); “L’Inarchiviabile” at the FM Centro per l’Arte Contemporanea (2016).

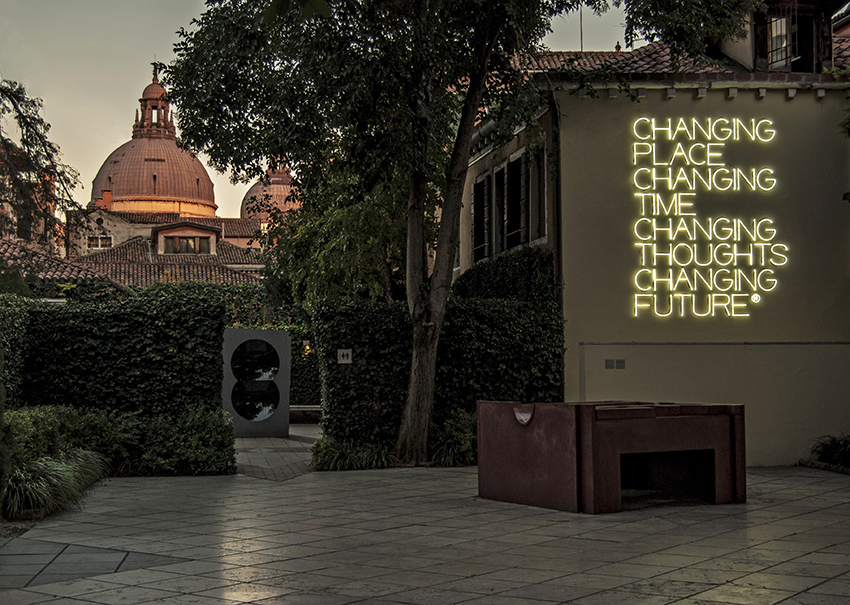
Maurizio Nannucci, Changing place, Guggenheim Venice, 2003

== Editorial activities ==
He founded the publishing houses Exempla (1968), Recorthings (1975), and Zona Archives Edizioni (1976), editing and publishing books, records and multiples on such contemporary artists as Sol LeWitt, John Armleder, James Lee Byars, Robert Filliou, Lawrence Weiner, Ian Hamilton Finlay, Carsten Nicolai, Olivier Mosset, Rirkrit Tiravanija.Richard Long. Franco Vaccari. From 1976 to 1981 he published Mèla Art Magazine.

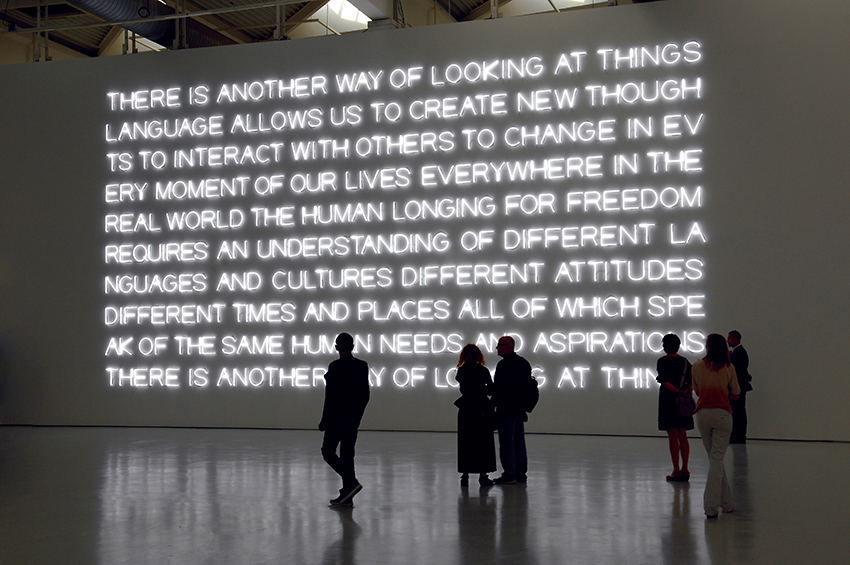
Maurizio Nannucci, There is another way of looking, MAM Saint'Etienne, 2012

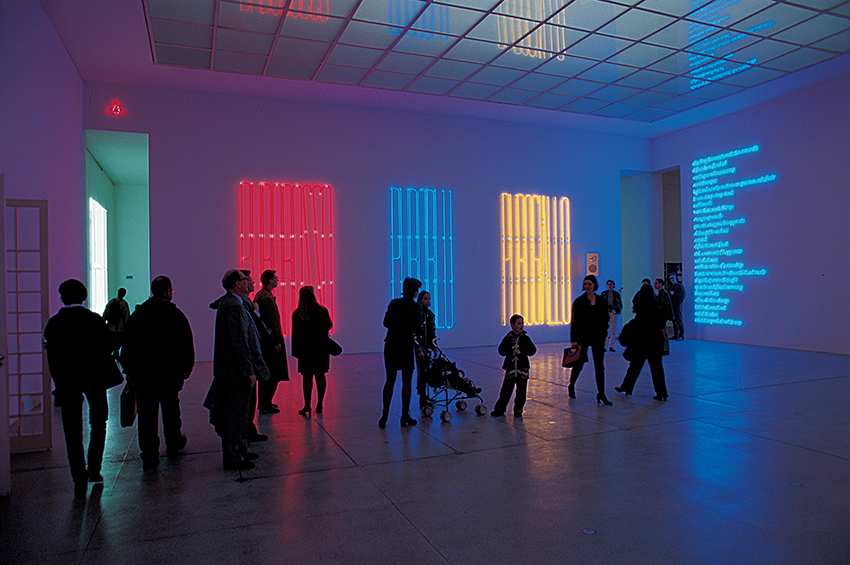
Maurizio Nannucci, Puro rosso puro giallo puro blu, 1990

== Exhibitions ==
- 1967 Centre Arte Viva, Trieste
- 1968 Galerij Margaretha de Boevé, Assenede
- 1973 Galleria Christian Stein, Torino
- 1973 Salone Annunciata Milano
- 1974 Neue Galerie am Landesmuseum Joanneum, Graz
- 1974 Galerie Denise René & Hans Meyer, Düsseldorf
- 1974 Galeria Schema, Firenze
- 1975 Galleria Massimo Minini, Brescia
- 1975 Ecart, Geneve Galerie
- 1976 Galerie Müller-Roth, Stuttgart
- 1977 Galleria Forma, Genova
- 1977 Documenta, Kassel
- 1978 Biennale di Venezia, Venezia
- 1978 Galerie im Taxispalais, Innsbruck
- 1979 Galerie Walter Storms, München
- 1979 Internationaal Cultureel Centrum, Antwerpen
- 1979 Galerie Sudurgata, Reykjavik
- 1982 De Vleeshal, Middelburg
- 1983 Sala d’Arme, Palazzo Vecchio, Firenze
- 1984 Kunstverein Frankfurt, Frankfurt
- 1987 Italian Cultural Institute & Art Metropole, Toronto (Snow, Wiener, Nannucci)
- 1988 Westfälischer Kunstverein, Münster
- 1989 Gallery Victoria Miro, London
- 1989 Gallery Graeme Murray, Edinburgh
- 1989 Elac, Lyon (Mattiacci, Mochetti, Nannucci)
- 1990 Gallery Insam Gleicher, Chicago
- 1991 Gallery Victoria Miro, Firenze
- 1991 Städtische Galerie im Lenbachhaus, München
- 1992 Villa delle Rose, Galleria d‘Arte Moderna, Bologna
- 1992 Villa Arson, Nice
- 1993 Kasseler Kunstverein, Fridericianum, Kassel
- 1994 Bibliothèque Nationale de France, Paris
- 1994 Aarhus Kunstmuseum, (Turrell, Nannucci, Nauman), Aarhus
- 1995 Wiener Secession, Wien
- 1997 Galerie Fahnemann, Berlin
- 1997 Galerie Walter Storms, München
- 1998 Museum Rupertinum, Salzburg
- 1999 Cabinet des Estampes, Geneve
- 2000 Biennale di Venezia Architettura, Venezia
- 2002 Sprengel Museum, Hannover
- 2003 Mamco, Musée d’art contemporaine, Genève.
- 2003 Biennale di Valencia, La Ciudad Ideal, Valencia
- 2003 Palazzo Farnese, (Morellet, Nannucci), Ambassade de France, Roma
- 2004 Pièce Unique, Paris
- 2005 Galleria Fumagalli, Bergamo
- 2005 Bury Art Gallery Museum, Bury / Manchester
- 2006 Palazzo della Triennale, Milano
- 2007 Galerie Nikolaus Ruzicska, Salzburg
- 2008 Museum der Moderne Mönchsberg, Salzburg
- 2009 Villa Medicea La Magia, Quarrata (Pistoia)
- 2010 Galleria degli Uffizi, Firenze
- 2012 Musée d’Art Moderne, Saint Etienne
- 2012 Dum Umeni / The house of art, Budweis
- 2013 No more excuses, Stazione Leopolda, Firenze
- 2013 Galerie Nikolaus Ruzicska, Salzburg
- 2013 Giacomo Guidi Arte Contemporanea, Roma
- 2013 Galerie mfc-michèle didier, Paris
- 2015 Maxxi, Museo Nazionale delle Arti del XXI secolo, Roma
- 2015 Museion, Bolzano

== Museums and public installations ==
- Museum of Fine Arts, Boston
- Cnap, Centre National des Arts Plastiques, Paris & Metz
- Kunsthalle Weinhaupt, Ulm
- Carpenter Center, Harvard University, Cambridge
- Bibliothek des Deutschen Bundestages, Berlin
- Bundesministerium Auswärtiges Amt, Berlin
- Altes Museum, Museumsinsel, Berlin
- Städtische Galerie im Lenbachhaus, München
- Europäisches Patentamt, München
- Sprengel Museum, Hannover
- Musée d’Art Contemporain, Lyon
- Mamco, Musée d’Art Moderne et Contemporaine, Genève
- Villa Arson, Nice
- Frac Nord-Pas de Calais, Dunquerke
- Frac Corse, Bastia
- Universität / Università, Bozen / Bolzano
- Centro d’Art Contemporanea Pecci, Prato
- Bank-Building, Edinburgh
- Parco della Musica, Auditorium di Roma
- Aeroporto Fiumicino, Terminal A, Roma
- Galleria d’Arte Moderna, Torino
- Schauwerk, Sindelfingen
- Museion, Bolzano
- Neue Galerie am Joanneum, Graz
- Villa Medicea, La Magia, Quarrata
- Mambo, Museo d’Arte Moderna, Bologna
- Centro de Arte de Salamanca
- Petersbrunnhof, Salzburg
- Muhkka, Museum van Hedendaagse Kunst, Antwerpen
- Bank für Internationalen Zahlungsausgleich, Basel
- Peggy Guggenheim Collection, Venezia
- Van der Heydt Museum, Wuppertal
- Kunstraum Alexander Bürkle, Freiburg
- Muzej Suvremene Umjetnostii, Zagreb
- Museum am Ostwall, Dortmund
- Centre Georges Pompidou, Paris
- Stedelijk Museum, Amsterdam
- Museum of Modern Art, New York
- National Gallery of Canada, Ottawa
- The Sol LeWitt Collection, Chester
- Enssib, Villeurbanne, Lyon
- Museum der Moderne Mönchsberg, Salzburg
- Museum Sztuki, Lòdz
- Fondazione Teseco, Pisa
- Swiss Office Building, Airport Basel / Mulhouse / Freiburg
- Münchener Rück, München & Milano
- Borusan Contemporary, Istanbul
- Zumtobel, Dornbirn
- Bury Art Gallery Museum, Bury
- Museum of Fine Arts, Boston
- Otto Maier Verlag, Ravensburg
- Museo del Novecento, Arengario, Milano
- Viessmann, Information Center, Berlin
- Dresdner Bank, Frankfurt
- Deutsche Flugsicherung, Hannover
- Spreespeicher, Berlin
- Hubbrücke, Kloster Unserer Lieben Frauen, Magdeburg
- Università Bocconi, Milano
- Mart, Museo d’Arte Contemporanea, Rovereto
- Palazzo della Pilotta, Parma
- City Life, Palazzo delle Scintille, Milano
- hypermaremma, Rocca Aldobrandesca, Talamone

== Multiples ==
- whichever word, a neon text in 3 colors: blue, red and yellow. Limited to 7 numbered and signed sets containing the 3 colors. Each neon text measures 8 x 75 x 2,5 cm. Produced and published in 2012 by mfc-michèle didier.

== Bibliography ==
- Emmett Williams, Anthology of concrete poetry, Something Else Press, New York, 1967.
- Achille Bonito Oliva, Fare e pensare, Marcatré 50/55, Roma, 1969
- Gillo Dorfles, Maurizio Nannucci, cat. Galleria Vismara, Milano, 1969
- Achille Bonito Oliva, Amore mio, cat. Palazzo Ricci, Montepulciano, Centro Di, Firenze, 1970
- Giulio Carlo Argan, Maurizio Nannucci, cat. Galerie Keller, München, 1971
- Mario Diacono, Introduction to Maurizio Nannucci / Poemi Cromatici, Exempla Editions, Firenze, 1971
- Paolo Fossati, L'azione concreta, cat. Villa Olmo, Como, 1971
- Jorge Glusberg, Arte de sistemas, cat. Museo de Arte Moderna, Buenos Aires, 1972
- Enrico Crispolti, Volterra 73, cat. Centro Di, Firenze, 1973
- Mario Diacono, Luigi Ballerini, Italian Visual Poetry, cat. Finch Museum College, New York, 1973
- Gerhard Johann Lischka, Maurizio Nannucci / Sempre cercando piccole differenze, Der Löwe 8, Bern, 1976
- Renato Barilli, Parlare e scrivere, La nuova foglio, Macerata, 1977
- Germano Celant, Offmedia, Dedalo libri, Bari, 1977
- Germano Celant, The Record as Artwork, cat. The Fort Worth Art Museum, Fort Worth, 1978
- Henry Chopin, Poésie sonore internationale, Jean Michel Place, Paris, 1979
- Pier Luigi Tazzi, Maurizio Nannucci / To cut a long story short, cat. De Vleeshal, Middelburg, 1982
- Bill Furlong, Live to air: artists sound works, cat Tate Gallery, London, 1982
- Peter Weiermair, Maurizio Nannucci. Always endeavour to find some interesting variations, cat. Frankfurter Kunstverein, Frankfurt, 1984
- Peggy Gale, Snow, Weiner, Nannucci, cat. Art Metropole, Toronto, 1987
- Thierry Raspail, Mattiacci, Mochetti, Nannucci, cat. Elac, Lyon, 1989
- Christian Bernard, Maurizio Nannucci / L'absence de monde est le monde, cat. Maurizio Nannucci, Villa Arson, Nice, 1992
- Gabriele Detterer, Starlight: Nauman, Turrell, Nannucci, cat. Kunstmuseum, Aarhus, 1994
- Anne Moeglin-Delcroix, Des livres, des enveloppes et des boîtes in: Maurizio Nannucci, cat. Bibliothèque Nationale, Paris, 1994
- Gabriele Detterer and Maurizio Nannucci, Bookmakers, interview, cat. Biennale of Artists' Books, Limoges, 1995
- Pierre Restany, Maurizio Nannucci. Solomon's Seal, Domus, May, Milano, 1995
- Georges Didi-Huberman, Didier Semin, L'empreinte, Editions du Centre Pompidou, Paris, 1997
- Helmut Friedel & Gabriele Detterer, Light picture / Word picture, Maurizio Nannucci / Where to start from, cat. Europäisches Patentamt, München, Zona Archives Editions, Firenze, 1999
- Markus Brüderlin, Colour to Light, cat. Fondation Beyeler, Basel, Hatje Cantz Verlag, Stuttgart, 2000
- Achille Bonito Oliva, Sergio Risaliti, Orizzonti. Belvedere dell'Arte, cat. Forte Belvedere, Firenze, Skira Editore, Milano, 2003
- Marco Meneguzzo, Maurizio Nannucci, Artforum, Summer, New York, 2005
- Daniel Soutif, L’art du xxeme siecle, 1939/2002, Editions Citadelle & Manzenod, Paris, 2005
- Elio Grazioli, Il collezionismo come voluttà e simulazione, intervista a Maurizio Nannucci, Studio Permanente & A+mbookstore edizioni, Milano, 2006
- Achille Bonito Oliva, Enciclopedia della parola / Dialoghi d’artista, 1968/2008, Skira editore, Milano, 2008
- Hans Ulrich Obrist, Senza aver paura di contraddire se stessi, interview, cat. Maurizio Nannucci, Something Happened, Gli Ori. Pistoi, 2009
- Alexander Pühringer, Im Licht der wörter, Maurizio Nannucci, Untitled, Herbst, Berlin, 2011
- Lorand Hegyi & Gabriele Detterer, Maurizio Nannucci, There is another way of looking at things, Silvana Editoriale, 2012
- Anne Moeglin Delcroix, Esthetique du livre d’artiste, Le Mot et le Reste, Paris, 2012
- Bartolomeo Pietromarchi, Il neon nell’arte Italiana, interview, in Neon / La materia luminosa dell’arte, Macro, Roma, Quodlibet, Macerata, 2012
- Gabriele Detterer, Maurizio Nannucci, Artist-run spaces, Documents, JRP/Ringier, Zurich & Les Presses du rèel, Dijon & Zona Archives, 2012
- Ed Ruscha, Various Small Books, The Mit Press, Cambridge & London, 2013
- Hou Hanru, Bartolomeo Pietromarchi, Stefano Chiodi, Maurizio Nannucci / Where to Start from, MAXXI - Museo nazionale delle arti del XXI Secolo / Roma, Mousse Publishing, Milano, 2015
- Maurizio Nannucci, ED/MN Editions and Multiples 1967/2016, ViaIndustriae publishing, Foligno, 2016
- Bag Book Back. Maurizio Nannucci. Incertain Sens, Dijon, France, Les Presses du réel & le Frac Bretagne, 2013, 104 p. (ISBN 978-2-914291-49-1)
- Where to start from, Maurizio Nannucci, catalogue Maxxi Museum, Mousse, Milan 2015
- Top Hundred, Maurizio Nannucci, Museion, Bolzano & Museo Marini, Zona Archives, Firenze 2017
- To cut a long story short: writings, interviews, notes, pages, scores, Corraini editore, Mantova & Zona Archives, Firenze
- This sense of hopenness / Correspondences, Maurizio Nannucci, Flat edizioni, Torino 2019
