= Roslan =

Roslan is a given name and a surname. Notable people with the name include:

- Roslan Ahmad, Malaysian politician, Malacca State Executive Councillor
- Wan Roslan Wan Hamat (born 1966), Malaysian politician, Kelantan State Executive Councillor
- Emmett Roslan Ishak, lead vocalist in Butterfingers, a Malaysian rock band
- Abdul Afiq Roslan (born 1996), Bruneian footballer
- Faizal Roslan (born 1995), Singaporean professional footballer
- Farhan Roslan (born 1996), Malaysian footballer
- Fauzi Roslan (born 1988), aka Kojie, Malaysian footballer
- Izzuddin Roslan (born 1999), Malaysian professional footballer
- Jamaluddin Roslan (born 1978), Malaysian field hockey player
- Razman Roslan (born 1984), Malaysian professional footballer
- Syazwan Roslan (born 1988), Malaysian footballer
- Takhiyuddin Roslan (born 1993), Malaysian footballer
- Roslan Sulaiman (born 1969), Malaysian academic administrator

== See also ==
- Rizlan
- Rosaleen
- Rosalyn (disambiguation)
- Roslin (disambiguation)
- Roslyn (disambiguation)
- Rosslyn (disambiguation)
- Rozalin (disambiguation)
- Ruslan (disambiguation)
