= List of LGBTQ Armenians =

This is a list of LGBT Armenians, which includes Armenians, who are part of the LGBT disambiguation and have either stated publicly or been outed as homosexual, transgender, lesbian, bisexual or queer. Those of partial Armenian descent are also included.

== Activists ==
- Mamikon Hovsepyan – former executive director of Pink Armenia and former Armenia liaison for GALAS LGBTQ+ Armenian Society
- Lilit Martirosyan – co-founder of Right Side NGO, transgender

== Art ==
=== Actors ===
- Raoul Aslan – Austrian actor, gay
- Eric Bogosian - American actor, playwright and author
- Chaz Bono – American writer, musician and actor, transgender
- Alexandra Hedison – American actress, lesbian
- Narbe Vartan – actor, transgender

=== Comedians ===
- James Adomian – American stand-up comedian, actor, and impressionist, gay

=== Dancers ===
- Bob Avian – choreographer, theatrical producer and director, gay
- Arthur Gourounlian – Armenian-born professional dancer and television personality, gay

=== Drag ===
- Anoush Ellah – drag queen
- Tabboo! – drag queen and multimedia artist
- VERA! – drag king and competitor on season 2 of King of Drag, non-binary and transgender

=== Fashion ===
- Ray Aghayan – American fashion designer and costume designer for the United States film industry, gay

=== Filmmakers ===
- Alek Keshishian – film and commercial director

=== Models ===
- Lauren Chan - Armenian/Chinese plus size model, lesbian.

=== Musicians ===
- Eve Beglarian – contemporary American composer, performer and audio producer of Armenian descent, lesbian
- Armen Ra – Iranian-Armenian artist, self-taught thereminist, gay

=== Painters ===
- Arman Grigoryan – painter who was one of the founders of the Third Floor (Armenian: Երորդ Հարկ) modern art group, gay

=== Sculptors ===
- Michael Aram – American sculptor, gay

== Businesspeople ==
- Francis Kurkdjian – perfumer, gay

== Chefs ==
- Julia Sedefdjian – French chef

== Politics ==
- Ike Hajinazarian – former Regional Communications Director at the White House (2021), gay
- Jeff Marootian – former Assistant Secretary for Energy Efficiency and Renewable Energy (2022–2025), gay
- Jirair Ratevosian – former acting chief of staff to the United States Global AIDS Coordinator (2022–2023), gay
- Amy Shuklian – District 3 member of Tulare County, California's Board of Supervisors (2016–present), and former city council member in Visalia, California (2007–2016), lesbian
- Alek Bartrosouf – Member of the city council in Glendale, California (2026-present)

== Pornography ==
- Adam Ramzi – American porn star, gay

== Religion ==
- Sarmad Kashani – Armenian sufi mystic

== Sports ==
- Mel Daluzyan – weightlifter, transgender

== Writers ==
=== Literary and creative ===
- Nancy Agabian – American writer, bisexual
- Christopher Atamian – literary critic, writer, translator, art curator and filmmaker, gay
- Armen Davoudian – poet, gay
- George Stambolian – key figure in the early gay literary movement, gay
- Hrag Vartanian – writer, art critic, and curator, gay

=== Journalism ===
- Lillian Avedian – former Assistant Editor for The Armenian Weekly and current writer for Nashville Banner, lesbian
- Vic Gerami – journalist, gay
- Karèn Shainyan – Russian journalist, LGBT activist, and YouTuber, gay

== See also ==
- LGBTQ Rights in Armenia
- Same-sex marriage in Armenia
