= Adams Hill, Glendale, California =

Adams Hill
- Neighborhood
- Location within Los Angeles County Location within Southern California Location in California
- Coordinates: 34°08′01″N 118°14′28″W
- Country: United States
- State: California
- County: Los Angeles County, California
- City: Glendale, California

Adams Hill is a neighborhood in the south area of Glendale, California, United States. The neighborhood's business district, Adams Square, is at the base of the Glendale side of the hill.

== History ==
From 1911 until 1918, Adams Hill was part of an independent city known as Tropico. In 1918, Tropico was annexed by Glendale.

Adams Hill was a predominantly Anglo-American neighborhood, but by the 1990s, had a rapidly growing Armenian population.

In 1998, the city began at the behest of Mayor Eileen Givens to revitalize Adams Square, which was considered blighted at the time. Mayor Givens sponsored a "Visioning Tour" so the neighborhood could provide input about how they envisioned a revitalized square to look and feel. Funding for a Community Development Block Grant and the City of Glendale's Redevelopment Department was provided to give the entire revitalization program momentum. A separate initiative to revitalize/restore the 1936 Streamline Moderne gas station was initiated with support from a grassroots group, The Friends of Historic Adams Square including a vision to surround it with a green space. In 2000, Adam Schiff, who was a state senator representing Glendale at the time, obtained $250,000 in state funds for the project. In 2016, the station was added to Glendale Register of Historic Resources and Historic Districts and converted into a public art gallery. The station and surrounding park, dubbed the Adams Square Mini-Park, are the epicenter of the Adams Hill neighborhood.

== Arts and culture ==
The Glendale Public Library's Library Connection @ Adams Square branch operates in the neighborhood.

Since 2016, the 1936 Richfield Oil Company gas station has been readapted as a public art space and The City of Glendale's Arts & Culture Commission has curated and sponsored art installations in the station as a public art gallery.

In 2024, the City installed colorful crosswalks and painted curb extensions as part of the City's "Creative Crosswalks" public art program.

=== LGBT+ community ===
Following COVID-19-related issues in 2020 and 2021, glendaleOUT's annual Glendale Pride in the Park, a family-friendly picnic, came to fruition in June 2022. Glendale Library, Arts & Culture joined the inaugural event as part of its effort to document the history of Glendale's LGBTQ community through audio and video testimonies.

The Glendale Public Library's Library Connection @ Adams Square branch hosts occasional LGBT+ events. These have included a 2023 GALAS LGBTQ+ Armenian Society-sponsored reading of author Nancy Agabian's "The Fear of Large and Small Nations".
