= GlendaleOUT =

LGBTQIA+ rights non-governmental organization

glendaleOUT
- Founded: 2019
- Type: Advocacy organization
- Purpose: LGBT activism
- Headquarters: Glendale, California
- Location: United States
- Region served: Glendale, California
- Methods: Campaigning; advocacy
- Website: www.glendaleout.org

glendaleOUT is a grassroots organization dedicated to LGBT+ advocacy in Glendale, California.

== History ==
glendaleOUT formed out of a 2019 multi-venue Pride Month event for art created by Glendale Unified School District students. One of the organization's founders, local artist Grey James, later remarked, "Silver Lake, West Hollywood... why do I have to export my gay? Why can't I be gay where I live? So, I set about doing that." An inaugural LGBT Pride event was planned to be held in Glendale's Central Park in 2020, before the COVID-19 pandemic resulted in its cancellation.

In March 2022, glendaleOUT, alongside GALAS LGBTQ+ Armenian Society, Pink Armenia, Right Side NGO and YWCA Glendale and Pasadena, cohosted a panel discussion entitled "Improving Allyship For Armenian LGBTQIA+ Communities".

Following COVID-19-related issues in 2020 and 2021, the annual Glendale Pride in the Park, a family-friendly picnic held in Adams Hill, came to fruition in June 2022. Glendale Library, Arts & Culture joined the inaugural event as part of its effort to document the history of Glendale's LGBTQ community through audio and video testimonies.

In December 2022, glendaleOUT hosted a candlelight vigil outside Glendale City Hall to mourn and remember LGBTQ+ deaths. The vigil raised funds for the Transgender Law Center and Pink Armenia.

Following an anti-LGBT+ protest at the June 6, 2023 Glendale Unified School District Board of Education meeting, glendaleOUT took on a more active role in addressing hate in local schools, noting that the protest and uptick in hateful rhetoric resulted fewer students participating in gender-sexuality alliance events.

In October 2023, glendaleOUT joined the Museum of Neon Art's "Light in the Dark: Queen Narratives in Neon" exhibition, with member Paul Manchester participating in a panel discussion about LGBTQ+ connections to neon art and the Glendale, California community. Other panelists included museum trustee Eric Lynxwiler, filmmaker Rachel Mason, sex educator Buck Angel, neon artist Dani Bonnet, and activist Shant Jaltorossian of GALAS LGBTQ+ Armenian Society.

In 2024, glendaleOUT launched PROJECT:PRO+ECT, a joint community project which provides support to Glendale Unified School District students.

== Programs and services ==
=== Crown Jewel Award ===
glendaleOUT acknowledges allies with the Crown Jewel Award, its name referring to Glendale, California's nickname, "Jewel City".

Honorees include:

- Anthony Portantino (2023), "for being the only elected official who showed up to our events throughout the year[.]"
- GUSD Parents for Public Schools (2024), for "amass[ing] a thorough network of public education facts and resources systemically debunking the false hysteria from local Christian Nationalists."

=== PROJECT:PRO+ECT ===
PROJECT:PRO+ECT is a joint community project which provides support to queer and questioning Glendale Unified School District students.

== See also ==
- GALAS LGBTQ+ Armenian Society
- Los Angeles LGBT Center
