= Mary Basmadjian =

American comedian

- Born: 1987 (age 38–39)

Comedy career
- Medium: Stand-up
- Website: www.marybasmadjiancomedy.com

Mary Basmadjian (born 1987) is an Armenian-American stand-up comedian. Basmadjian is popularly known for her character Vartoush Tota, an "auntie" who performs "the particular mannerisms of an immigrant well-versed in the nuances of Soviet and post-Soviet Armenia".

== Early life ==
Basmadjian grew up in Hollywood and Pasadena. She is estranged from her mother, and grew up with her maternal grandparents.

== Career ==
Among other locations, Basmadjian has performed at Flappers Comedy Club and El Portal Theater.

In 2016, Basmadjian participated in the Armenian Bone Marrow Donor Registry's "Laughter For Life" fundraising event.

In 2018, Basmadjian, as Equality Armenia's Director of Outreach, stated that "it’s our duty to open the hearts and mind of those in our traditionally conservative culture." Later that year, she hosted GALAS LGBTQ+ Armenian Society's 20th anniversary gala.

During the 2020 COVID-19 lockdowns, Basmadjian performed extensively via social media, particularly sketch comedy with characters such as Vartoush Tota, "[s]porting a thick, trendy leopard print coat, extra long acrylic nails, a disheveled piecey auburn wig and overdrawn red lipstick[.]"

Basmadjian performed for the Children of Armenia Fund's virtual 2020 annual fundraiser.

Basmadjian's first comedy special, Funny Armenian Girl, was released on Prime Video and Apple TV in February 2024.

== Filmography ==
=== Comedy specials ===
Year	Title	Notes	Ref.
2024	Funny Armenian Girl	Premiered on Prime Video and Apple TV	
