= Shield of Islam Brigade =

Iraqi Militant Group

- لواء درع الإسلام
- Dates active: 2005–2011
- Dissolved: 2011
- Ideology: Jihadism; Anti-Zionism

Shield of Islam Brigade (Arabic: لواء درع الإسلام, romanized: Liwāʼ Dirʻ al-Islām) was a small and mostly unknown insurgent group during the Iraq War.

== Iraq Insurgency ==
During the group's active times, Shield of Islam Brigade used sniping tactics during the Iraq Insurgency, they also mostly assassinated people at checkpoints. The group would rarely get any prominence from any other group during the insurgency. They also would do small front-line attacks on Iraqi and U.S. military checkpoints. Even though the group wouldn't get prominence from other insurgent groups, they did receive arms and allyship with Al-Qaeda in Iraq.

== Online presence ==
Shield of Islam Brigade posted videos of them assassinating people and uploaded it onto Jihadist forums.
