= Pink Armenia =

Armenian LGBT rights campaign

- Փինք Հայաստան
- Founded: 2007; 19 years ago
- Legal status: Non-governmental organization
- Purpose: LGBT rights in Armenia, LGBT activism
- Location: Yerevan, Armenia
- Region served: Armenia
- Methods: Advocacy
- Director: Mamikon Hovsepyan
- Affiliations: ILGA-Europe
- Website: www.pinkarmenia.org

Pink Armenia (Armenian: Փինք Հայաստան, romanized: P’ink’ Hayastan) is the first LGBTQIA+ rights non-governmental organization in Armenia. Pink Armenia was founded in 2007 and is headquartered in Yerevan. Its mission is to serve and support the needs of lesbian, gay, bisexual, transgender individuals in Armenia, to promote their human rights protection, and to advocate for the change of public policy around LGBT issues.

== Organization ==
Pink Armenia runs various programs and advocacy campaigns and provides a wide range of services to members of the LGBT community, including emergency response, case management, legal assistance, social support, family support, and mental health support. The organization has also established partnerships with local and international organizations working in the fields of sexual health, human rights protection, fighting against discrimination, promoting equality and diversity, increasing understanding of gender issues, and supporting the development of a strong democracy in Armenia. The current director of Pink Armenia is Mamikon Hovsepyan. The organization works closely with Right Side NGO on related trans matters, including advocating for easier gender self-identification.

In 2011, Pink Armenia became a full member of ILGA and ILGA-Europe. In 2014, Pink Armenia became a member of the Eastern European Coalition for LGBT + Equality, which is a network of LGBT+ organizations from the EU's Eastern Partnership member states of Armenia, Georgia, Moldova, Ukraine, plus Russia, which mainly focuses on improving the situation for LGBT+ people and problems throughout Eastern Europe.

Pink Armenia participates in dialogue with the government of Armenia and provides certain recommendations. In 2015, as part of Armenia's UN's Universal Periodic Review, the organization provided the government with the recommendation to include sexual orientation and gender identity as a recognized ground of discrimination in Armenia’s draft anti-discrimination law.

The organization supports the goals of the 2018 Armenian revolution, with many members having taken part in the protests. Mamikon Hovespyan stated that "while LGBT+ people were present at previous protests, this time they were more visible and accepted."

== History ==
Pink Armenia was founded in 2007 and its main focus is on raising public awareness on LGBT issues and sexually transmitted infection prevention. Since 2007, its programs included trainings and conferences in Gyumri, Dilijan, Vanadzor, and Yerevan.

On 21 May 2012, the organization held a diversity parade in Yerevan to commemorate World Day for Cultural Diversity.

In May 2015, the organization sent a letter to the former President of Armenia, Serzh Sargsyan calling on the president to protect the rights of LGBT people and for government officials to monitor the cases of direct and indirect discrimination on sexual orientation and gender identity grounds.

According to a 2016 survey study on societal attitudes towards LGBT people, conducted by PINK Armenia and the Women's Initiatives Supportive Group in neighboring Georgia, only 9% of Armenians said they knew an LGBT person.

In October 2016, Pink Armenia hosted a premiere of "Listen To Me: Untold Stories Beyond Hatred," a documentary film produced by PINK Armenia about the lives of ten LGBT individuals in Armenia. Pink Armenia invited several government representatives and ministries to attend the film's premiere, however none responded. In 2017, the Golden Apricot Yerevan International Film Festival cancelled screenings of both "Listen to Me" and Apricot Groves. Pink called the incident "not only discrimination against Armenian LGBT community, and violation of freedom of expression and freedom to create, but also a slap to Armenian cinematography[.]"

In 2018, at GALAS LGBTQ+ Armenian Society's twentieth anniversary gala in Glendale, California, Pink Armenia director Mamikon Hovsepyan stated "Armenia has such a great potential to become one of the best countries in the world where human rights are protected, where everybody enjoys equality and harmony, where discrimination has no place."

On 28 February 2018, Equality Armenia hosted a charity event in Pasadena to raise funds for Pink Armenia.

During an increase in anti-LGBT+ political discourse in 2018, Hasmik Petrosyan, an attorney for PINK Armenia, stated "It's very unpleasant to hear that LGBT is a headache for the government. But let's face it, it is. In such political turmoil, when everything will be used against you, it's hard to change the direction of the narrative. The LGBT issue is being artificially put on the agenda for political reasons, to manipulate the public."

Following the 2022 Russian invasion of Ukraine, Pink Armenia released a statement that the organization was prepared to help the LGBT+ community of Ukraine and Russia who require assistance, including legal aid and counselling.

In March 2022, YWCA Glendale and Pasadena, glendaleOUT and Glendale Unified School District educator Patrick Davarhanian hosted a digital panel entitled "Improving Allyship For Armenian LGBTQIA+ Communities". Panelists included Yerevan State University professor Vahan Bournazian; Pink Armenia director Mamikon Hovsepyan; Right Side NGO founder Lilit Martirosyan; Charachchi member Perch Melikyan; and Erik Adamian of GALAS, and the ONE Archives Foundation. Panelists relayed observations on human rights violations of LGBTQIA+ community members in Armenia, as depicted in the 2016 documentary "Listen to Me: Untold Stories Beyond Hatred". Panelists also highlighted responses from youth and advocates and presented a call to action to improve allyship for LGBTQIA+ youth and adults in both Armenia and the United States.

On 1 November 2022, during Pink Armenia's "2022 Rainbow Forum" in Yerevan, Garo Paylan, an ethnic Armenian member of Turkey's parliament, made an impromptu visit after meeting Armenia's prime minister Nikol Pashinyan earlier that day. Paylan stated, "If Armenia wants to be a democratic country, it should respect LGBTIQ rights". The forum was the 7th annual forum hosted by Pink Armenia and over 140 people participated in the event which was supported by the Government of Sweden.

In April 2023, police raided Poligraf, a prominent nightclub in Yerevan known as a safe space for Armenia's LGBTQ+ community, detaining over forty individuals. Pink Armenia has condemned the incident, with chairperson Lilit Avetisyan stating, "They laid all those present on the ground, used violence, took everyone to the [police] department, and started mocking them, mainly based on their clothing and sexual orientation."

In November 2024, during her visit to Armenia, Swedish activist Greta Thunberg visited Pink Armenia, which stated "We extend our gratitude to Greta Thunberg for raising Armenia's critical issues on international platforms and for showing her solidarity with the LGBT+ movement."

Pink Armenia has denounced Donald Trump's attacks on United States Agency for International Development (USAID), stating that "Cutting these funds will not only disrupt civil society but also hinder [Armenia's] economic and social development, endangering the well-being of vulnerable groups."

As of January 2026, Pink Armenia has been granted consultative status by four government ministries: the Ministry of Health, the Ministry of Internal Affairs, the Ministry of Justice and the Ministry of Labor and Social Affairs.

== Recognition and impact ==
The organization and its staff members have received awards and recognition at the international level for their work.

== See also ==
- Helsinki Citizens’ Assembly–Vanadzor
- Human rights in Armenia
- LGBT rights in Armenia
- List of LGBT Armenians
- List of LGBT rights organisations
- Recognition of same-sex unions in Armenia
- Social issues in Armenia
