= GALAS LGBTQ+ Armenian Society =

LGBTQIA+ rights non-governmental organization

- Founded: 1998 (as Gay and Lesbian Armenian Society)
- Type: Advocacy organization
- Legal status: 501(c)(3) organization
- Purpose: LGBT activism; Anti-racism; Immigrant rights
- Location: West Hollywood, United States
- Region served: Southern California
- Methods: Campaigning; advocacy; support groups; education
- Affiliations: Armenian Justice Coalition
- Website: www.galasla.org

GALAS LGBTQ+ Armenian Society (formerly Gay and Lesbian Armenian Society) is one of the first LGBTQIA+ rights non-governmental organizations founded by Armenian Americans. GALAS was founded in 1998 and is headquartered in West Hollywood, California. Its mission is to serve and support the needs of lesbian, gay, bisexual, transgender and queer individuals of Armenian descent, to promote their human rights protection, and to advocate for the change of public policy around LGBTQ+ issues. GALAS is a 501(c)(3) non-profit organization.

== History ==
=== 1990s ===
In 1998, GALAS was founded in Los Angeles County, California.

In January 1999, GALAS held its first election to fill the seven seats on the newly created Board of Directors, and the original organizational bylaws were ratified.

=== 2000s ===
In 2001, members of GALAS joined members of Q-Hye in San Francisco to form the first Armenian contingency ever to march in the San Francisco Pride parade. In total, 25 members of both organizations carried banners and Armenian flags down Market Street.

In 2002, GALAS participated for the first time in Los Angeles Pride, where the organization hosted an information booth featuring Armenian music, pictures, and maps of Armenia. Volunteers handed out informative brochures about GALAS, Armenian history, and gay Armenian life.

In 2007, following the assassination of journalist Hrant Dink in Istanbul, GALAS hosted a panel discussion featuring reexamining the social and political environment in Turkey. Participants included Armenian National Committee of America Community Relations Director Haig Hovsepian. During the question and answer session, the audience discussed their concerns regarding Armenian Genocide recognition.

In 2008, Herbert Hoover High School in Glendale, California planned a Day of Silence commemoration to recognize how LGBT+ youth have been "silenced" by harassment and bullying in schools. In response to an ensuing local campaign to keep children out of school on that day, Haig Boyadjian, then the President of GALAS, wrote a letter to the editor of the Glendale News-Press, stating "We want to state unequivocally that the handful of Armenian parents who were vitriolic in their opposition to the Day of Silence do not represent the entire Armenian community. Homosexuality not only exists, it exists within the Armenian community. The members of gay and lesbian society are the children and grandchildren of the Armenian community. We are lesbian, gay, bisexual and trans-gender and there is nothing wrong with us."

==== California Proposition 8 ====
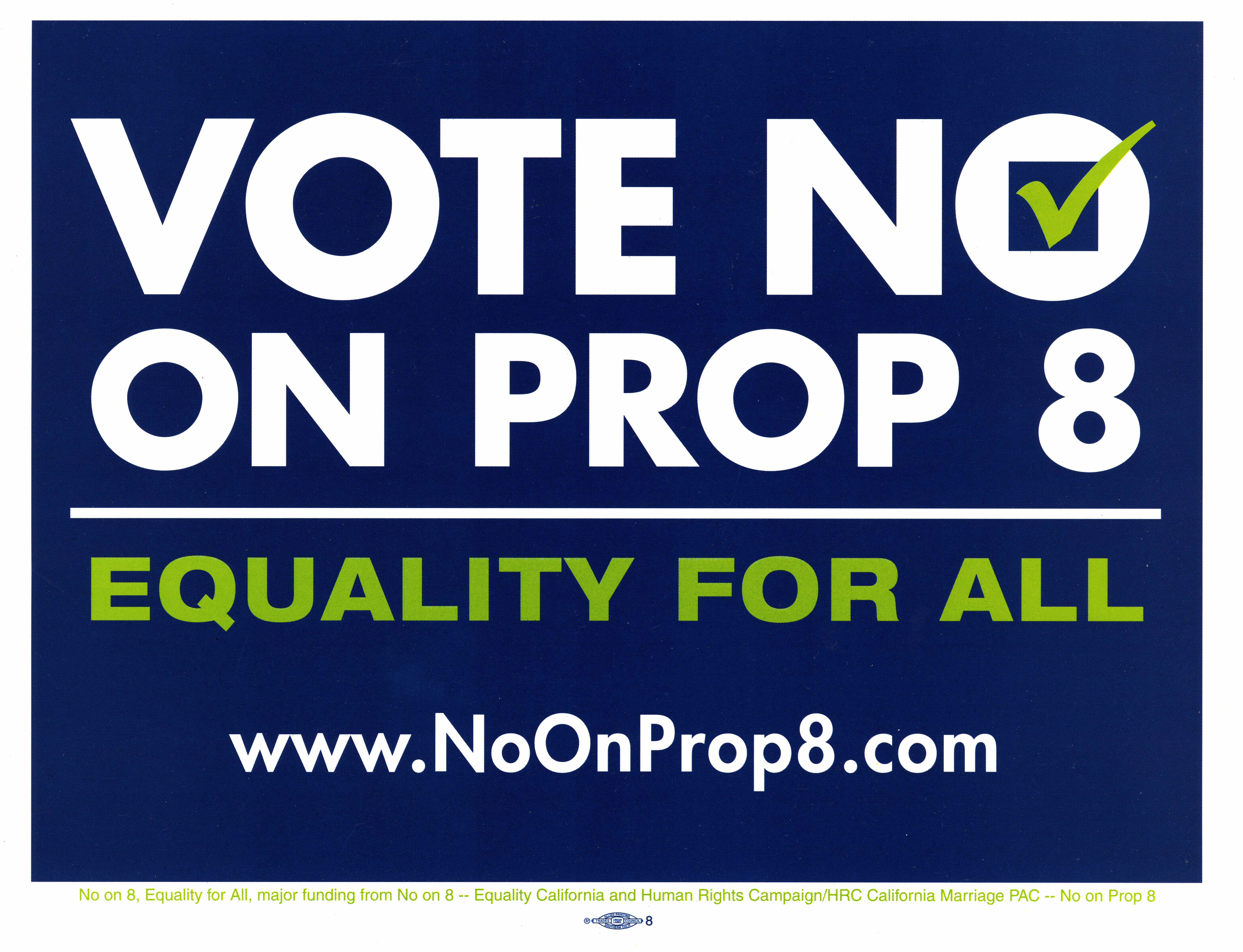
Official "Vote NO on Prop 8" placard.

In 2009, GALAS hosted a conference at West Hollywood's Plummer Park, entitled "The Road to Equality: The Past, Present and Future of the Gay Rights Movement," which concentrated on the aftermath of California Proposition 8 — which banned same-sex marriage in California — and ongoing cases in the California Supreme Court. The guest panel included attorneys from Lambda Legal, representatives from the Los Angeles LGBT Center, and managers of Vote for Equality Campaign, who discussed the various aspects of Proposition 8, including social, cultural and legal. The success of Proposition 8 was contrasted with the failure of the 1976 Briggs Initiative, which sought to ban gays and lesbians from working in California's public schools. Also discussed was GALAS' future, and its role in protecting LGBT+ civil rights.

=== 2010s ===
In 2010, GALAS again held a conference at Plummer Park, this time entitled "Breaking Through: Legally, Politically, Culturally." Speakers from Lambda Legal and Equality California discussed the current status of efforts to overturn Proposition 8, SB 906 (Civil Marriage Religious Freedom Act).

The Armenian National Committee of America's Raffi Hamparian stated:

The Armenian American community is a broad and diverse entity and one where all voices should be welcomed and heard. The political activism needed to advance justice with respect to the Armenian Genocide and Artsakh is needed from all segments of our community. That means we need the involvement of everyone in our community; young and old, rich and poor, those with a college degree and those with none, those who are gay and those who are straight, or those who were born in America or those who came to this country as immigrants. The rainbow of diversity in our community is a strength, not a weakness. We need to seize our diversity to advance our common cause for justice. This I believe.

In 2010, GALAS raised over $5,000 for AIDS Walk, benefitting APLA Health, an AIDS service organization dedicated to improving lives of people affected by HIV, reducing HIV infection and advocating for fair and effective HIV-related public policy.

==== 2012 DIY firebombing ====
During the early morning hours on 8 May 2012, Yerevan LGBT+ bar DIY was fire-bombed. On 15 May, a second attack occurred. GALAS responded shortly thereafter, stating

The response by members of the Armenian Parliament has been equally atrocious. Artsvik Minasyan, who represents the Armenian Revolutionary Federation (Dashnaktsutyun), posted bail for one of the suspects who were charged with the fire-bombing. Afterwards, Minasyan said to Panorama news agency that the suspects '…acted the right way, in context of our societal and national ideals.' We reject his actions and call upon the Armenian Parliament and Dashnaktsutyun to reprimand Minasyan and condemn his actions. Furthermore, we seek his immediate resignation or removal from office for his incitement of homophobia, and his endorsement of hate crimes. We further request a statement from the Armenian Parliament and the Dashnaktsutyun stating that neither organization will stand by those who foster hate and intolerance. Let not those who have faced the reality of intolerance and hatred inflict it upon others, no matter what the 'context of our societal and national ideals.'

==== Presidency of Donald Trump ====
In 2017, Los Angeles Pride replaced its traditional parade festivities with a protest against then-President Donald Trump's anti-LGBTQ+ policies. GALAS participated, declaring "We must rise together and be heard loud and clear - we will resist, we will win." This multi-ethnic and multi-religious coalition included organizations such as API Equality, Bienestar, Equality California, It Gets Better Project, JQ International, the Los Angeles LGBT Center, PFLAG, Satrang, Somos Familia Valle, and The Trevor Project.

GALAS denounced Fresno Unified School District President Brooke Ashjian's 2017 comments regarding the LGBTQ+ education requirements of the Healthy Young Act, which equated the LGBTQ+ community to the Ottoman perpetrators of the Armenian Genocide. Also in 2017, GALAS authored an op-ed applauding Arpa International Film Festival’s screening of the films "Listen to Me: Untold Stories Beyond Hatred" and "Apricot Groves" after the two films, which contain LGBT+ themes, were slashed from the 2017 program for the Golden Apricot Yerevan International Film Festival.

==== 20th anniversary celebrations ====
During the 20th century celebrations, GALAS board member Lousine Shamamian was quoted as saying, "GALAS formed 20 years ago because people weren't willing to abandon their Armenian identity in order to explore the rest of who they were, and in particular the way they wanted to love. GALAS continues to exist in order to facilitate and support this safe space which we see growing to one day include the homes of all Armenians."

In 2018, GALAS celebrated its twentieth anniversary at a gala hosted by comedians Lory Tatoulian, Mary Basmadjian, and Movses Shakarian. For GALAS, 2018 marked a renewed pledge to building bridges between GALAS and other LGBTQ+ and Armenian community organizations, and the organization considered the creation of affiliate chapters to raise awareness in both Armenia and across the Armenian diaspora. Among those honored at the event were comedian James Adomian and Mamikon Hovsepyan, executive director of Pink Armenia, an organization with which GALAS has closely partnered. Performances included Element Band, known for their distinctive musical arrangements that preserve and popularize traditional Armenian songs.

==== 2018 Shurnukh attack ====
Following the August 2018 attack on nine LGBT+ activists at a private home in the Armenian village of Shurnukh, Haig Boyadjian, then the president of GALAS, stated: "The Armenian government must once and for all take immediate steps to address the recent epidemic of violence targeting its LGBTQ citizens. We are deeply alarmed with the mysterious closing of criminal case regarding the violent attacks against 9 LGBTQ individuals last summer in the village of Shurnukh. The lack of action essentially condones and justifies future hate crimes against Armenia’s LGBTQ community. We are patiently waiting for Prime Minister Nikol Pashinyan to defend LGBTQ rights in the ‘New Armenia’ being forged and hope these senseless violent attacks will cease or at least be met with consequences under the law." GALAS joined over 100 Armenian organizations and prominent individuals in issuing a public letter to the Armenian government as well as Armenian political parties, international organizations and churches calling on them to condemn the attack and to promote legislative and policy changes to grant equality and end discrimination against LGBT persons in Armenia.

==== Inter-community dialogue ====
In November 2018, GALAS and the Glendale Library, Arts & Culture Department co-sponsored "Beyond Borders: Queer Pop-up Cafe," a moderated roundtable discussion intended to uncover common ground among various LGBTQ+ communities.

In response to several hate incidents targeting Armenian and Jewish institutions in the San Fernando Valley in early 2019, GALAS attended a meeting, hosted by California Assemblymembers Adrin Nazarian and Jesse Gabriel, of religious and lay leaders from the Armenian and Jewish communities for an inter-community dialogue. The discussion focused on efforts to combat hate and discrimination of all forms.

=== 2020s ===
==== Second Nagorno-Karabakh War ====
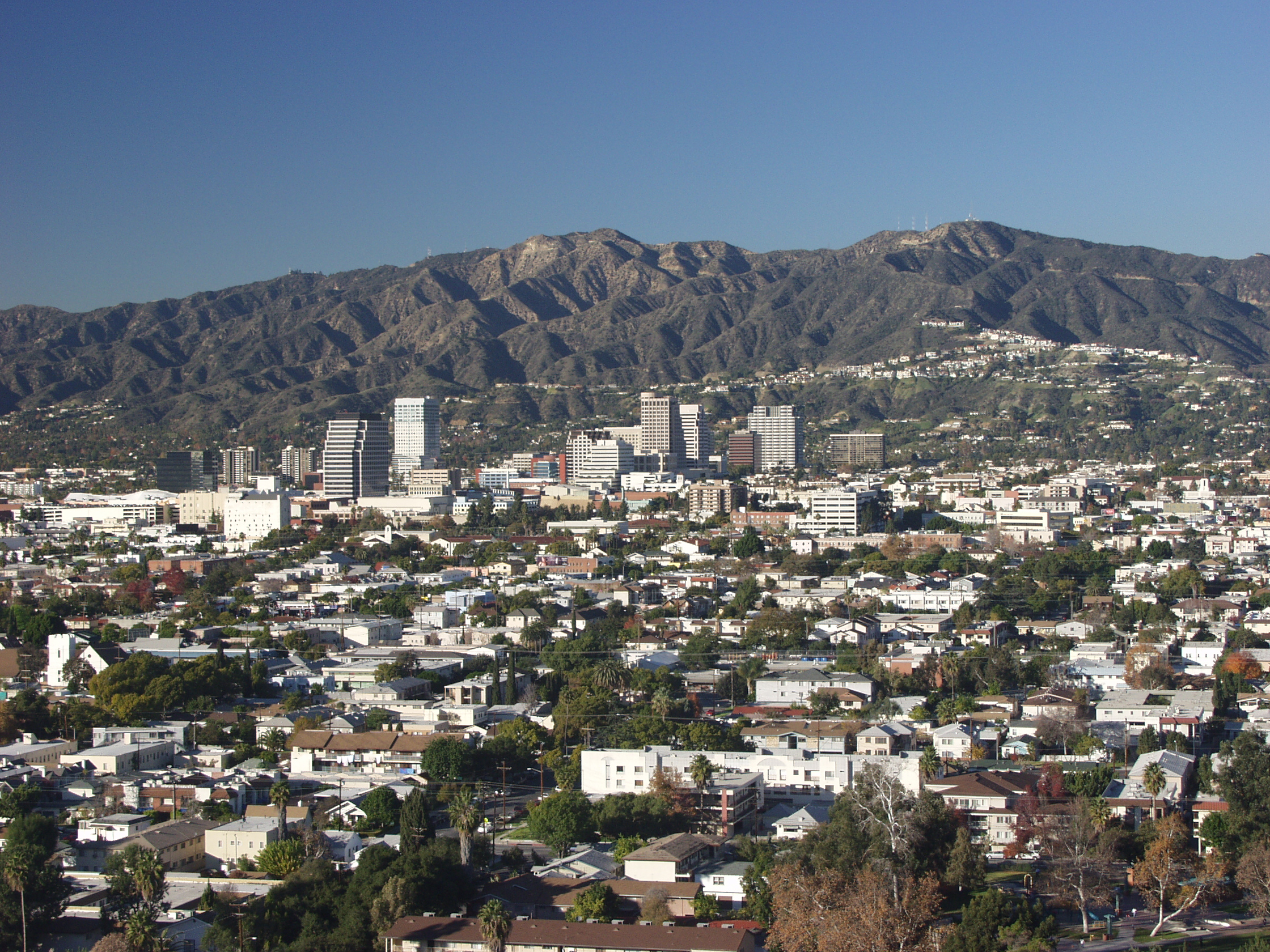
"For GALAS to be celebrating LGBTQ pride in Glendale — the heart of the Armenian diaspora — is a profound marker of the progress the LGBTQ Armenian community has made." – GALAS Boardmember Lousine Shamamian (2021)

In the aftermath of the Second Nagorno-Karabakh War, GALAS was invited to speak at the November 2020 launch of Kamee Abrahamian, Nancy Baker Cahill, Mashinka Firunts Hakopian, and Nelli Sargsyan's "Monument to the Autonomous Republic of Artsakh," an augmented reality monument geolocated at the intersection of Artsakh Avenue and East Broadway in Glendale, California.

==== Solidarity with other organizations and causes ====
In March 2022, YWCA Glendale and Pasadena, glendaleOUT and Glendale Unified School District social sciences teacher Patrick Davarhanian hosted a digital panel entitled "Improving Allyship For Armenian LGBTQIA+ Communities". Panelists included Yerevan State University professor Vahan Bournazian; Pink Armenia director Mamikon Hovsepyan; Right Side NGO founder Lilit Martirosyan; Charachchi member Perch Melikyan; and Erik Adamian of GALAS, ONE Archives Foundation and Charachchi. Panelists relayed observations on human rights violations of LGBTQIA+ community members in Armenia, as depicted in the 2016 documentary "Listen to Me: Untold Stories Beyond Hatred". Panelists also highlighted responses from youth and advocates and presented a call to action to improve allyship for LGBTQIA+ youth and adults in both Armenia and the United States.

In a June 2022 Pride Month article in the Armenian Weekly, GALAS President Erik Adamian stated that "The humans of GALAS affirm and accept each other, amidst hatred and division. We recognize that our journeys are also bigger than one person. When one of us is able to show up in the world authentic in our multiple identities, that makes it possible for others like us to do the same. The organization continues to provide invaluable tools for queer Armenians to invest in their own paths toward dignity and self-actualization."

Following the October 2022 suicide of Arsen and Tigran, a young gay couple in Yerevan, GALAS hosted a virtual support group, stating that "Despite our brave strides towards progress for LGBTQ+ Armenians, we are consistently subjected to blatant homophobia and transphobia from the larger Armenian community, resulting in unfathomable losses like those of Arsen and Tigran."

In January 2023, GALAS co-sponsored the Glendale Peace Walk, a Martin Luther King Jr. Day event. The event gathered a coalition of local organizations dedicated to equality, including Black in Glendale, glendaleOUT, the Glendale Environmental Coalition, the Glendale Teachers Association, and the Glendale Tenants Union.

In March 2023, GALAS hosted Right Side NGO founder Lilit Martirosyan at Glendale Central Library for a public discussion on the situation of LGBTQ+ people in Armenia, discrimination and human rights violations, and how supporters living in the United States can support LGBTQ+ people living in Armenia. California State Senator Anthony Portantino presented Martirosyan with a Certificate of Recognition. Other notable attendees included Burbank City Councilmember Nikki Perez, Glendale City Councilmember Dan Brotman, West Hollywood City Councilmember John Heilman, Glendale Board of Education member Shant Sahakian, Los Angeles Board of Education member Rocio Rivas, and Silver Lake Neighborhood Councilmember Maebe A. Girl.

In April 2023, GALAS participated in Glendale Library, Arts & Culture's Armenian History Month celebration, part of the library's Be the Change Series, a program "to build collective understanding of systemic racism, elevate the voices and stories of Black, Indigenous and People of Color (BIPOC)".

==== Response to anti-LGBTQ+ campaign in Los Angeles County school districts ====
In May 2023, in response to a series of anti-LGBTQ+ protests in Glendale Unified School District and Los Angeles Unified School District, GALAS, glendaleOUT and Somos Familia Valle released a joint statement denouncing efforts by some parents to undermine LGBTQ+ content within school programming and curricula.

Ahead of an announced protest at a June 2023 reading of author Mary Hoffman's "The Great Big Book of Families” at Saticoy Elementary School in North Hollywood and following the burning of an on-campus rainbow flag, GALAS released a statement that "Identities are formed at a very young age. It is critical to have expansive and inclusive language within schools that depict how different our identities, family structures and lives can be and how that is okay. LGBTQ+ children face a disproportionate amount of challenges, with amplified feelings of isolation and loneliness during teenage years. The inclusion of LGBTQ+ voices is a matter of saving lives; it is a matter of presenting children with critical support, rather than barriers, toward flourishing into healthy adults." The LGBTQ+ counter-protest, which is believed to have outnumbered the protest, was coordinated by local organizations including GALAS, Somos Familia Valle and the San Fernando Valley LGBTQ Center. GALAS President Erik Adamian was quoted as saying "LGBTQ+ individuals exist in all cultures and communities and our representation and our voices being heard is not a matter of discussion, it is a civil right that was earned through decades and decades of LGBTQ activism."

Ahead of a June 2023 Glendale Unified School District Board of Education meeting, GALAS President Erik Adamian commented, "I think that the conflict at GUSD is definitely symptomatic of the larger anti-LGBTQ attacks that have been going on all over the United States. I would say that right now, more than ever, it is very important for us… to make sure that our voices are heard and make sure the message we have is for inclusion of LGBTQ people within schools and within curriculum. LGBTQ people exist in all cultures and communities. Denying their existence in any culture and any community directly harms students because it reinforces that they don't belong." As a crowd of more than 200 — including far-right organizations such as the Proud Boys — gathered outside the Glendale Unified School District headquarters, GALAS joined organizations such as the Armenian American Action Network, Southern California Armenian Democrats and the Los Angeles LGBT Center in voicing support for the school district's LGBTQ+ policies.

Following the June 2023 Glendale Unified School District Board of Education meeting, GALAS, Armenian-American Action Network, and Southern California Armenian Democrats released a joint statement "calling attention to the collective safety of LGBTQ+ Armenians, the need for active allyship, and the dangers of alarmist and racist narratives about the Armenian immigrant population."

In an interview with Canadian newspaper The Globe and Mail, GALAS President Erik Adamian stated, "These attacks are presented as an exercise of parental rights. But they erase the voices of LGBTQ+ people. It is homophobic to say that LGBTQ+ content cannot be included in school curriculums. We have received hateful comments, and we have to think about the safety of our community. But we also know there is tremendous strength in us being together and organizing."

GALAS submitted a public comment in support of Los Angeles County Supervisor Lindsey Horvath's motion to study anti-LGBTQ+ incidents and additional measures the County can take to ensure the safety of LGBTQ+ residents.

Some progressive Armenian activists have noted similarities between anti-LGBTQ+ activism in their community and that in Arab American, Latin and other immigrant communities in the United States – a development they considered the result of a "deliberate divide and conquer strategy" by white conservative activists.

==== Response to increase in racist and transphobic violence ====
Following the July 2023 killing of O'Shae Sibley, GALAS' statement noted that "Sibley's killing is part of a larger trend of worsening anti-LGBTQ+ violence. Queer and trans people, especially those of color, are among the communities which have seen the sharpest increase in bias-motivated violence. This violence — and the anti-LGBTQ+ rhetoric from which it stems — has seen a worrying rise in recent years, and no community is exempt."

Following the August 2023 killing in Yerevan of Adriana, a transgender woman, GALAS called on non-LGBTQ+ Armenians to show allyship, stating that "While LGBTQ+ Armenians protect and uplift one another, allyship from the larger Armenian community is most integral in cultivating an equitable and just community that is welcoming and representative of all Armenians."

==== 25th anniversary celebrations ====
In September 2023, GALAS celebrated its twenty-fifth anniversary at a gala. The event was emceed by comedians Mary Basmadjian and Andy Kenareki, and performers included drag queen Anoush Ellah and singer Krista Marina.

On a March 2024 episode of Mike Bonin's podcast What's Next, Los Angeles?, GALAS President Erik Adamian recounted the backlash to GALAS' 25th anniversary gala, stating "There were some campaigns that were carried out after [the gala] targeted towards how GALAS is, quote-unquote, 'desecrating Armenian culture and identity', and targeting many of the people were in attendance at the gala, and what was being performed there. And, somehow, GALAS' program at the gala became a topic of discussion for parents in Glendale Unified, and it's all been very surreal. It's all been very disheartening to witness."

==== Response to 2023 attacks on Artsakh and Gaza ====
In response to the 2023 Azerbaijani offensive in Nagorno-Karabakh, GALAS, as part of the Armenian-American Justice Coalition, released a statement, calling "for all Armenians to remain united and focused as an Armenian diaspora community. We cannot afford more division. This is the time to protect all Armenians, so that we can continue to support our homeland. Our strength is in our people. We must build collectively and refuse to give up, as our people in our homeland are under attack." GALAS submitted a public comment in support of a Los Angeles County Board of Supervisors motion to provide humanitarian aid to refugees.

In response to the 2023 Israeli offensive in the Gaza Strip, GALAS, alongside organizations such as Jewish Voice for Peace, joined the Rising Majority coalition in condemning Israel's "occupation, apartheid, war crimes, and genocide", noting that "our struggles are inextricably linked [with Palestine]."

==== 2024-present ====
At the Glendale City Council's 2024 proclamation declaring June as LGBTQ+ Pride Month, GALAS Boardmember Shant Jaltorossian commented, stating “Our work as a cultural hub and resource group emphasizes the importance of intersectionality in our fight for justice. GALAS will continue to build a loving community which celebrates our roots, both Armenian and LGBTQ+, as we advocate for a better, more inclusive future."

In a July 2024 interview in the newspaper Agos, GALAS' mission was outlined as follows:

Our struggle in Los Angeles should be analyzed in relation to the struggles of other marginalized people. When we support the struggles of immigrants, people with disabilities, people who are subjected to sexism and racism, we are supporting the LGBTQ+ struggle. We can take steps to change patriarchal, nationalist and capitalist systems. We can learn about the issue ourselves and enlighten our environment. We can make sure that at least one more friend is informed about the issue.

== Programs and services ==
=== Data collection and research ===
In March 2023, GALAS submitted a supportive letter in response to the Office of Management and Budget's request for public comments on the initial proposals from the Federal Interagency Technical Working Group on Race and Ethnicity Standards for adding a Middle Eastern or North African category to the United States census. In the letter, GALAS maintains the following:

- Armenian-Americans are a sizable and important community that currently is not counted by the United States and must no longer be excluded;
- Armenian-Americans are among the top 3 largest MENA communities in terms of population size and must have that reflected with an Armenian checkbox on the new census form;
- Armenians are a transnational group in the MENA region and like other populations must be counted as a transnational group;
- Armenian-Americans overwhelmingly support Census classification that includes their community.

In an interview with The 19th, GALAS president Erik Adamian stated, "If you think about the number of Armenians here, and how many of us are queer, we are certain that with proper data gathering and census information we would be able to have access to a different level of information in terms of how large our community actually is, and how far and wide it reaches."

GALAS has endorsed California State Assembly bill AB 2763, commonly referred to as the California MENA Inclusion Act, which would require the State of California to add a distinct MENA (Middle Eastern and North African) category for all state data and agencies.

=== Armenian diaspora survey ===
GALAS has provided assistance to the researchers at the Calouste Gulbenkian Foundation's Armenian Diaspora Survey in collecting data pertaining to LGBTQI Armenians in the United States. The report, published in May 2023, suggests that Armenian Americans, particularly under the age of 35, are supportive of LGBTQI inclusion in the Armenian community.

[T]he study suggests that Armenians in the [United States] tend to be open-minded about wider societal issues. For instance, a question (Q25) in the survey is related to views on LGBTQI. The large majority of the respondents in the US (73%)... say, "Yes, one can be LGBTQI and be a part of an Armenian community." A higher percent (84%) of the 25-34 years old in the US were in the affirmative. About two in ten (US 16%) of the respondents said they do not have an opinion on the issue or "Don't know". Only about one in ten (US 11%) said, "No, one cannot be LGBTQI and be a part of Armenian community."

=== Soorj Session ===
Since 2018, GALAS has hosted its ongoing "Soorj Session" events, which are guided roundtable conversations between LGBTQ+ Armenians, their parents, families and friends to explore understanding and acceptance of LGBTQ+ identities and individuals. These conversations are facilitated by mental health and social work professionals through the sharing of coffee (Armenian: սուրճ, romanized: soorj). Due to significant demand, Soorj Sessions are now a regular GALAS program, held every other month. While the event was initially envisioned as youth-focused, organizers soon realized that parents and allies were also in need of the program.

=== Higher education ===
In May 2023, as part of Glendale Community College's Pride Week, GALAS hosted a panel discussion. Panelists shared their stories and provided insight in how to best support LGBTQ+ Armenians.

=== The arts ===
In June 2023, Glendale poet laureate Raffi Joe Wartanian hosted an evening of poetry readings and performances by local members of the LGBTQ+ Armenian community.

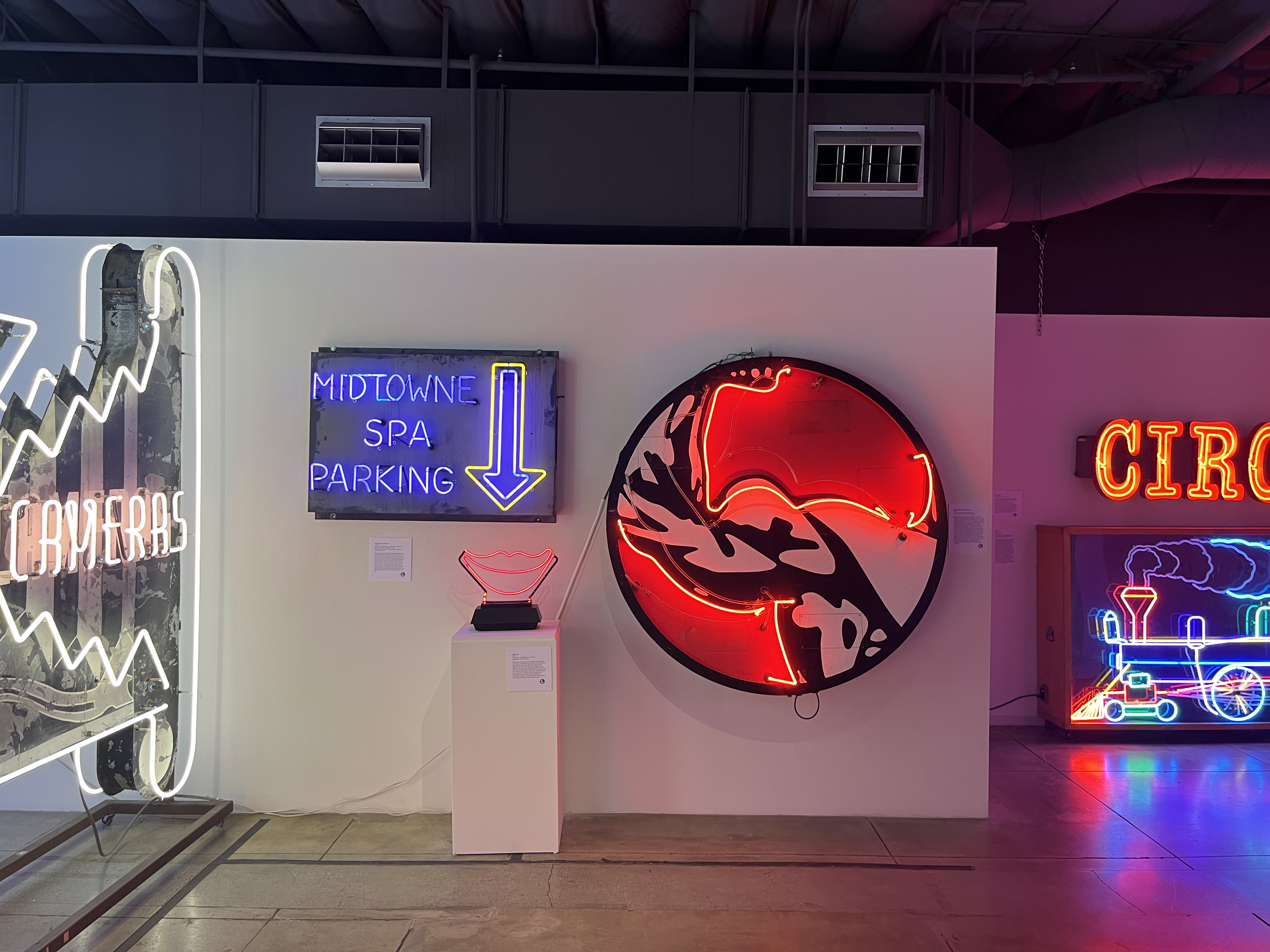
Light in the Dark exhibition at Museum of Neon Art

In 2018, GALAS, Abril Books, the Roslin Art Gallery, and ACE/121 Gallery collaborated to organize a series of LGBTQ-themed events, including an art show entitled "The Many Faces of Armenians: A Celebration of Queer-Armenian Art," in Glendale, California. Among the nearly 20 participating artists, most were Los Angeles-based. Their mixed-media work incorporated Armenian history and iconic symbols — such as the Armenian Genocide, Mount Ararat, and pomegranates — confronting duality of two cultures, but of being a gay immigrant, a minority within a minority. GALAS Boardmember Lousine Shamamian was quoted as saying "For GALAS to be celebrating LGBTQ pride in Glendale — the heart of the Armenian diaspora — is a profound marker of the progress the LGBTQ Armenian community has made."

In October 2023, GALAS hosted a visit to the Hammer Museum's "Becoming Van Leo" photography exhibition.

Also in October 2023, GALAS joined the Museum of Neon Art's "Light in the Dark: Queen Narratives in Neon" exhibition, with Boardmember Shant Jaltorossian participating in a panel discussion about LGBTQ+ connections to neon art and the Glendale, California community.

In 2016, GALAS held a sold-out screening of the Armenian Genocide film The Promise at the Cinerama Dome on its opening night.

Also in 2016, GALAS partnered with the Armenian Youth Federation to host a screening of "Listen to Me: Untold Stories Beyond Hatred," a documentary about Armenia's LGBT+ community. The screening served as a part of the official launch of the Armenian Youth Federation's United Human Rights Council's "Project Ser," a campaign to raise awareness about gender issues, sexuality, and LGBT issues.

In 2024, GALAS served as a community partner for American Cinematheque's "Three Homelands: A Sergei Parajanov Retrospective," alongside organizations including the Armenian Film Society and South East European Film Festival.

In May 2023, GALAS hosted author Taleen Voskuni for a discussion of her novel "Sorry, Bro" at 2220 Arts + Archives, in the Westlake neighborhood of Los Angeles.

In July 2023, GALAS, in partnership with Glendale Library, Arts & Culture and Abril Books, hosted author Nancy Agabian for a discussion of her novel "The Fear of Large and Small Nations". Reminiscing on this event, Agabian has stated that "GALAS has been really critical in resisting that backlash against the schools here that are participating in Pride Month."

=== Queernissage ===
Since 2021, GALAS has hosted Queernissage, a yearly open-air market inspired by Yerevan's Vernissage market, and featuring LGBTQ+ creatives of Southwest Asian and North African (SWANA) descent. Through this event, GALAS aims to create a space for its community members to express and share their creativity with each other and with the public.

At the 2021 event, then-Boardmember Lousine Shamamian was quoted as saying "One of the things that I noticed with all of the general action that was happening around Artsakh was that a lot of LGBTQ Armenians were actively engaging with the broader Armenian community. Prior to that, there was a separation of Armenian queer folks…they didn’t feel a sense of belonging to the bigger community.” A number of the vendors at the event began making their items as fundraisers for relief efforts in Artsakh.

Armenian digital media platform Miaseen featured the 2021 event in a series of videos named "Queernissage Profiles," which featured vendors at the event.

Items for sale at the 2022 event included spices, jewelry, pottery, posters, books, and even food. Among the attendees was Glendale mayor Ardy Kassakhian, who stated "If someone’s going to threaten this group of people, I’m going stand there with them and make sure I’m there and present and show myself as a mayor of a large Armenian community — saying that I am here to serve every Armenian."

Queernissage returned in August 2023.

== Honors and recognition ==
In May 2022, the City of Glendale issued a Pride Month proclamation honoring GALAS and glendaleOUT.

At an October 2022 fundraiser hosted by California State Assemblymember Adrin Nazarian, the organization and its members received awards and recognition from local elected officials, including Los Angeles County Supervisors Kathryn Barger and Hilda Solis, and Los Angeles City Councilmember Paul Krekorian.

In June 2023, the City of Glendale issued a Pride Month proclamation honoring GALAS and glendaleOUT, as well as a commendation celebrating GALAS' twenty-fifth anniversary.

Los Angeles County Supervisor Lindsey Horvath awarded GALAS with a 2023 John Anson Ford Human Relations Award, "for outstanding human relations projects and programs throughout the County".

== See also ==
- Equality Armenia
- glendaleOUT
- History of Armenian Americans in Los Angeles
- Human rights in Armenia
- LGBT rights in Armenia
- LGBT rights in the United States
- List of LGBT Armenians
- List of LGBT rights organizations in the United States
- Recognition of same-sex unions in Armenia
- Social issues in Armenia
