= Rosslyn =

Rosslyn can refer to:

== Places ==
=== Africa ===
- Rosslyn, Gauteng, South Africa
- Rosslyn Academy, a school in Nairobi, Kenya

=== Australia ===
- Rosslyn, Queensland, a town on the Capricorn Coast in the Shire of Livingstone

=== Europe ===
- Roslin, Midlothian, Scotland
  - Rosslyn Chapel
- Rosslyn Hill, a street in Hampstead, London
- Rosslyn House, a former house in Belsize Park, London
- Rosslyn Tower, a Grade II listed house in Putney, London

=== North America ===
- Rosslyn, Virginia, United States
  - Rosslyn station, the Washington Metro station serving Rosslyn
- Rosslyn (Edmonton), a neighborhood in the city of Edmonton, Canada
- Rosslyn, Kentucky, United States
- Rosslyn, Ontario, Canada

== Society ==
- Earl of Rosslyn
- Rosslyn Range, American long jumper

== See also ==
- Roslin (disambiguation)
- Roslyn (disambiguation)
- Rosslyn Park (disambiguation)
