= Museum of Neon Art =

Art museum in Glendale, California, United States

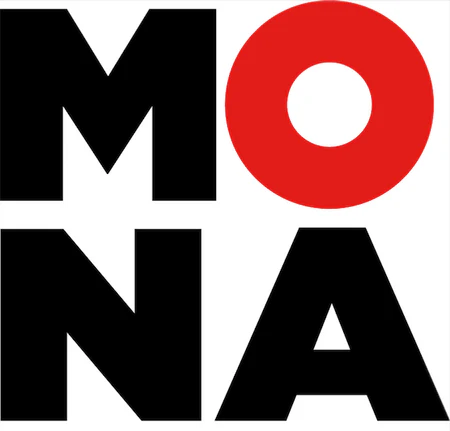
- Established: 1981
- Location: 216 S. Brand Blvd. Glendale, California, United States
- Coordinates: 34°08′37.5″N 118°15′17″W
- Type: Art museum
- Collection size: neon art
- Director: Corrie Siegel
- Website: www.neonmona.org

The Museum of Neon Art (MONA), in Glendale, California, United States, is an art museum that exhibits historic neon signs, and electric and kinetic art. The collection notably includes neon signs from the Brown Derby and Grauman's Chinese Theatre.

In 2020, Corrie Siegel was appointed as the museum’s executive director.

In addition to exhibitions and tours, the museum offers introductory classes in glass bending held in the museum's own studio.

== History ==
=== Arts District (1981–1992) ===
MONA was founded in 1981 by Lili Lakich and Richard Jenkins.

=== Universal CityWalk (1993–1995) ===
In 1993, MONA moved to Universal CityWalk.

=== Grand Hope Park (1996–2007) ===
In 1996, MONA moved to Grand Hope Park, in the South Park district of Downtown Los Angeles.

=== Historic Core (2008–2011) ===
In 2008, MONA moved to Downtown Los Angeles' Historic Core, but the museum's leadership soon realized that the new space was too small. By 2009, there were plans to move the museum to Glendale.

While located at the Historic Core location, MONA participated in the Downtown Los Angeles Art Walk, a recurring self-guided walking tour of galleries and public art in the neighborhood.

=== Dormancy (2012–2015) ===
In 2012, MONA turned down the donation of the neon sign of an Arby's restaurant in Santa Monica, California due its size, reportedly 20 feet wide by 35 feet tall.

In 2013, MONA began to operate a 2,500-square-foot warehouse in Pomona, California, where it stores more than 250 pieces of its collection.

=== Glendale (since 2016) ===
The museum reopened in Glendale, California in 2016. MONA's Glendale facility was designed by Shimoda Design Group, and was adapted from two existing structures: a pharmacy and a video arcade. A public paseo, created through strategic demolition, bisects the site and draws visitors across a landscaped deck to Central Park and Central Library. The paseo will also connect to the under-construction Armenian American Museum.

Due to the COVID-19 pandemic, MONA was on the brink of closure in 2020, but through increased memberships and donations, the museum was able to survive. At a belated 40th anniversary celebration, highlighted by the "40 Years of Light” exhibition, attendees were able to tour the galleries and hear from featured neon artists. Artist Roxy Rose, who is transgender, highlighted MONA's support of the LGBT+ community, stating “I want to say 'thank you' to MONA, the staff members and everyone here for making this a safe place to be.”

== Management ==
MONA has a Board of Directors and an Advisory Board.

== Collection ==
The museum holds numerous items, including neon art, clocks, photographs, and neon signs.

Some objects in the Museum's collection include:

- Derby sign from Brown Derby (1929)
- "Rugs" sign from Pasadena Rug Mart, an early Armenian American-owned business (1930s)
- Sign from Matsuno Sushi in the Little Tokyo neighborhood of Los Angeles, California, one of the few businesses to survive the Internment of Japanese Americans (1930s)
- Sign from Billy's Deli, one of the few Jewish business in Glendale during its sundown town era (1950s)
- Dragon sign from Grauman's Chinese Theatre (1957)
- Animated sign from Body Builders Gym, a gay-friendly gym in the Silver Lake neighborhood of Los Angeles, California (1970s)
- Architectural art from a hallway in Man's Country, the longest-running gay bathhouse in Chicago, Illinois (1970s)
- Parking sign from Midtowne Spa, a former gay bathhouse in Los Angeles, California (1970s)
- Sign from Circus of Books, a bookstore and gay pornography store in West Hollywood, California (1980s)
- Signs and clock from Faultline Bar, a gay bar formerly located in the East Hollywood neighborhood of Los Angeles, California (1990s)

== Exhibitions ==
=== Memorial to Armenian Genocide (2021) ===
In 2021, the museum presented a window-based public display in honor of Armenian History Month, marking the 106th anniversary of the Armenian Genocide.

MONA's Curator of Engagement and Education, Ani Mnatsakanyan, noted that "The 44-day war in 2020 that was waged against the indigenous Armenians in Artsakh by Azerbaijan, backed by Turkey, retraumatized Armenians globally, because it brought up unresolved emotions about the continuous denial and cultural erasure of the Armenian people by Turkey and Azerbaijan. This year’s Genocide commemoration will be especially difficult to cope with as a result of that, but the support for the community through artistic means is meant to highlight the resilient spirit of the Armenian people and provide some light during these dark times through the arts".

=== Light in the Dark: Queer Narratives in Neon (2023) ===
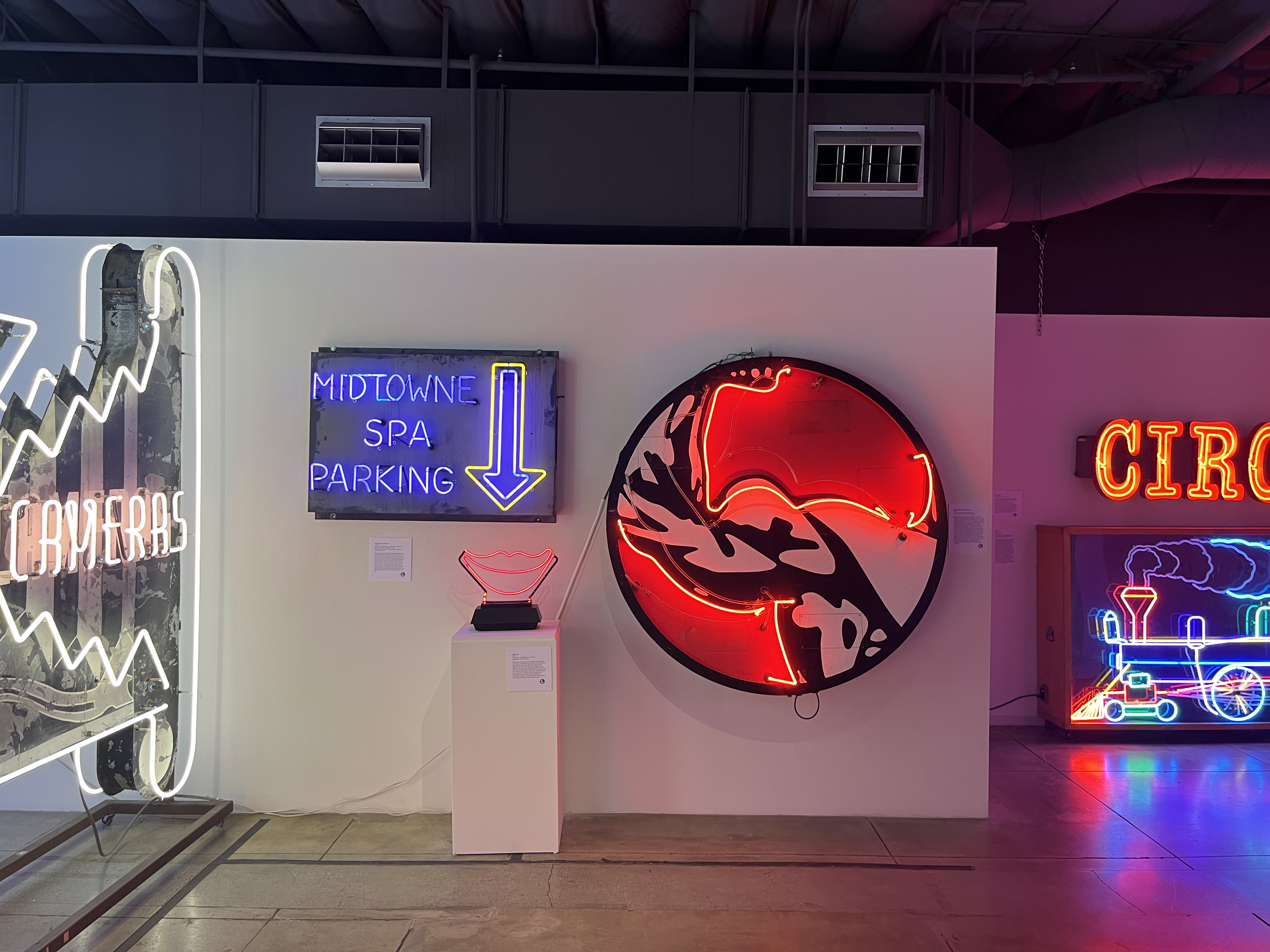
"Light in the Dark" exhibition

In 2023, as part of the One Institute's Circa: Queer Histories Festival, MONA organized "Light in the Dark: Queer Narratives in Neon", featuring notable items in the museum’s collection, including neon signs from LGBT+ businesses and artworks made by LGBT+ artists and craftspeople. Programming included a panel discussion about LGBT+ connections to neon art, the Glendale community, and the museum, and included museum trustee Eric Lynxwiler, filmmaker Rachel Mason, sex educator Buck Angel, neon artist Dani Bonnet, activist Paul Manchester of glendaleOUT, and activist Shant Jaltorossian of GALAS LGBTQ+ Armenian Society. Lynxwiler noted that several of the businesses included in the exhibition aided queer men during the AIDS crisis, and served as community spaces.

The Executive Director Corrie Siegel remarked that:

"The stereotype that Americana is something as cisgender, white, and heterosexual, holds still for many folks[.] MONA aims to address these stereotypes and demonstrate the diverse histories neon shares. LGBTQ pioneers in neon demonstrate that queer histories are deeply woven into American history. The future of the medium continues to be advanced by LGBTQ artists and preservationists."

== Tours ==
=== Neon night walks ===
MONA offers guided walking tours through various Los Angeles County neighborhoods, including Glendale, Koreatown, Hollywood, the Broadway Theatre District, and Chinatown.

=== Neon cruise ===
MONA offers double-decker bus tours, which depart from Downtown's Historic Core and visit locations including Chinatown and Hollywood.

== Neon preservation and restoration ==
MONA advocates for the preservation of historic signage and the buildings on which they are mounted. The museum has saved and restored over 500 historic signs, and helped relight over 150 signs across Los Angeles County.

Following the 2024 closure of the Arby's restaurant in Hollywood, MONA was consulted regarding preservation of its neon sign. MONA's executive director, Corrie Siegel, has noted that it is in the museum’s best interests to keep the sign preserved in-place, in the context in which it was created. The family of the business' founders have urged the City of Los Angeles to designate the sign as a Los Angeles Historic-Cultural Monument.

== Awards and recognition ==
In 2022, the Los Angeles Conservancy presented MONA with a Preservation Award, recognizing the museum's achievements in historic preservation.

In 2024, the California Association of Museums and the California Department of Education presented the Superintendent's Award for Excellence in Museum Education to MONA for its School Engagement Program, which offers professional development for teachers, classroom workshops, museum field trips and free family admission for students.

== Selected objects ==
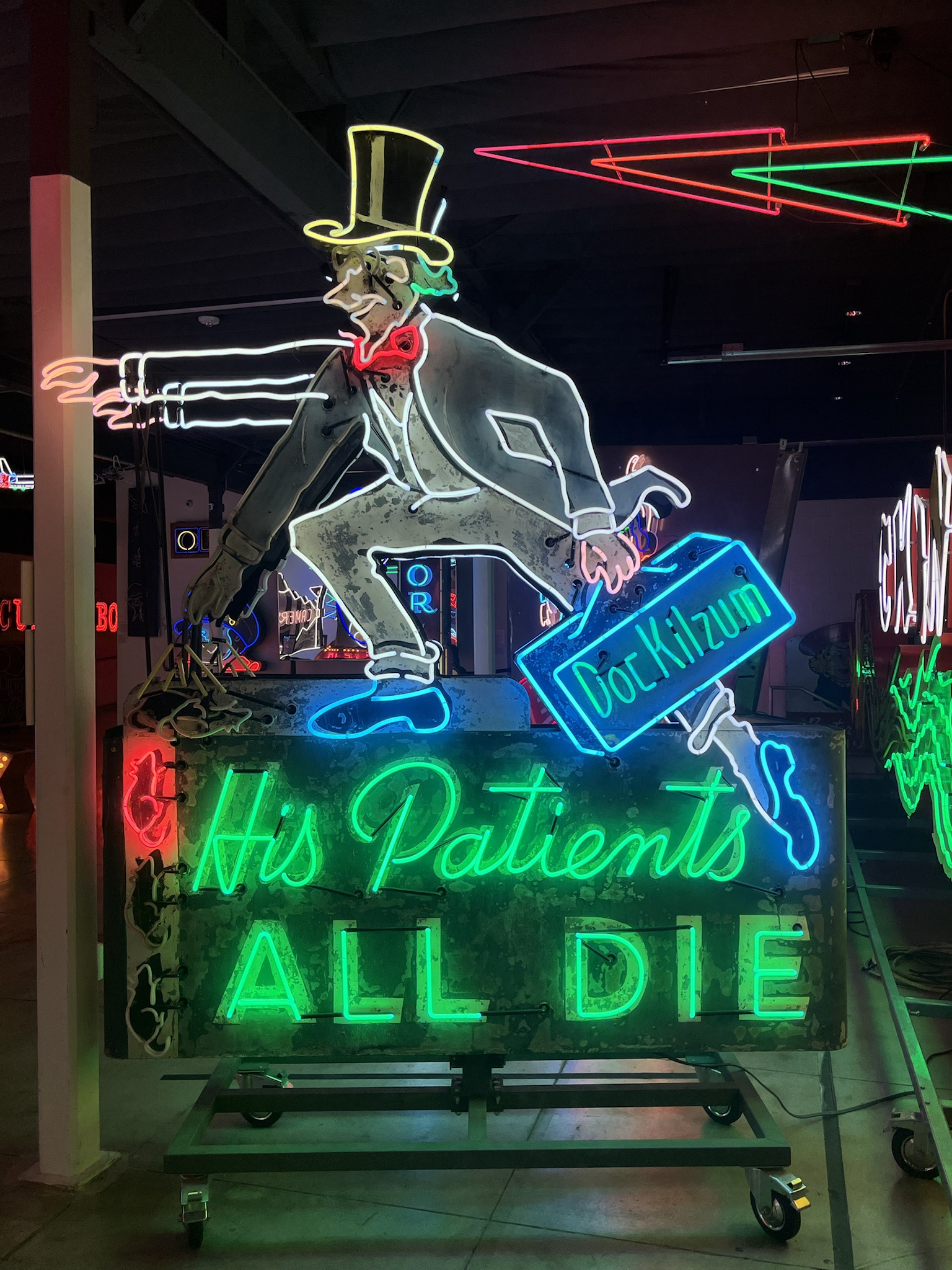
Doc Kilzum animated neon sign from Paramount Pest Control (1940s)

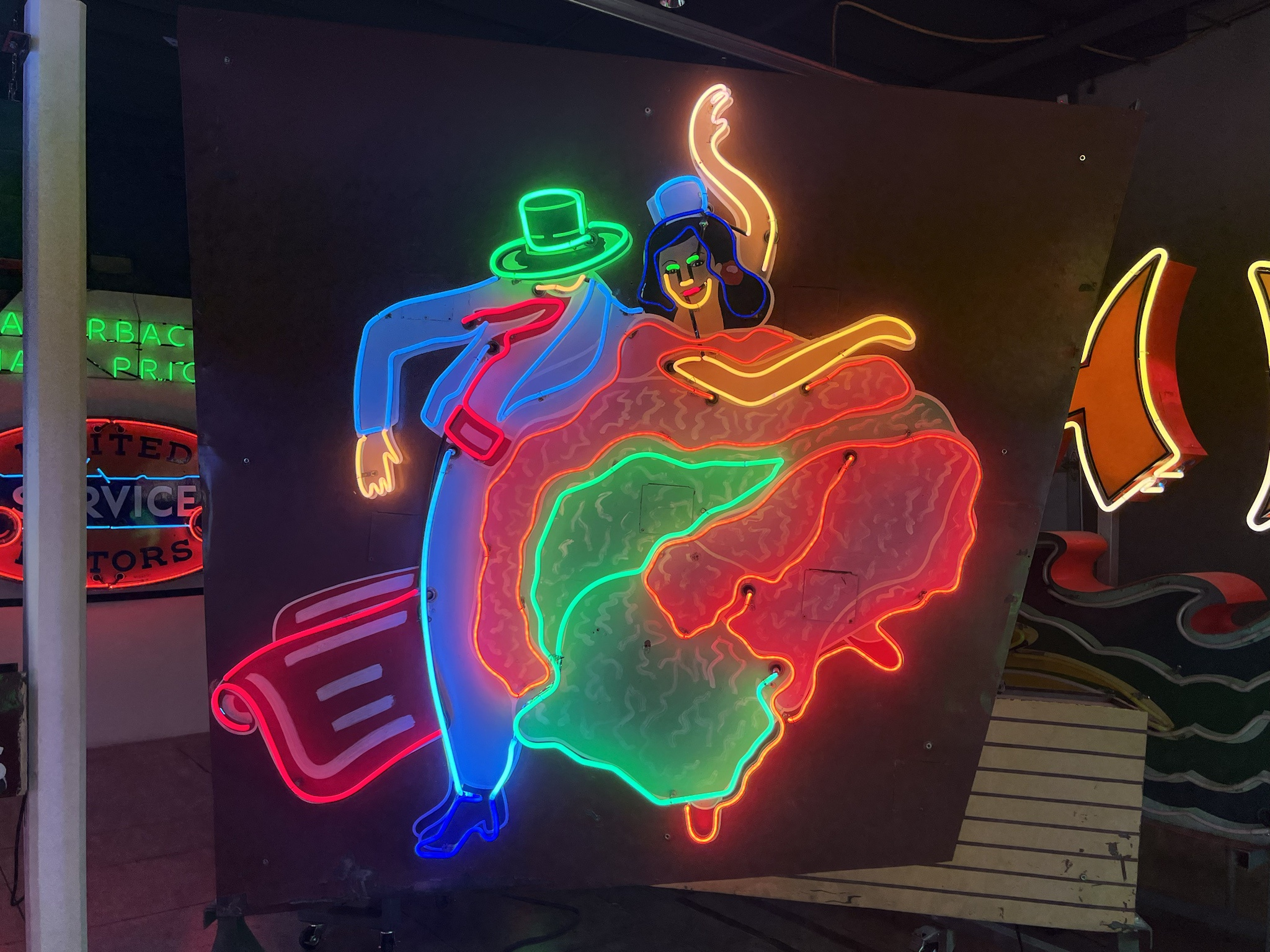
Neon sign from La Fonda Mexican restaurant (1940s)

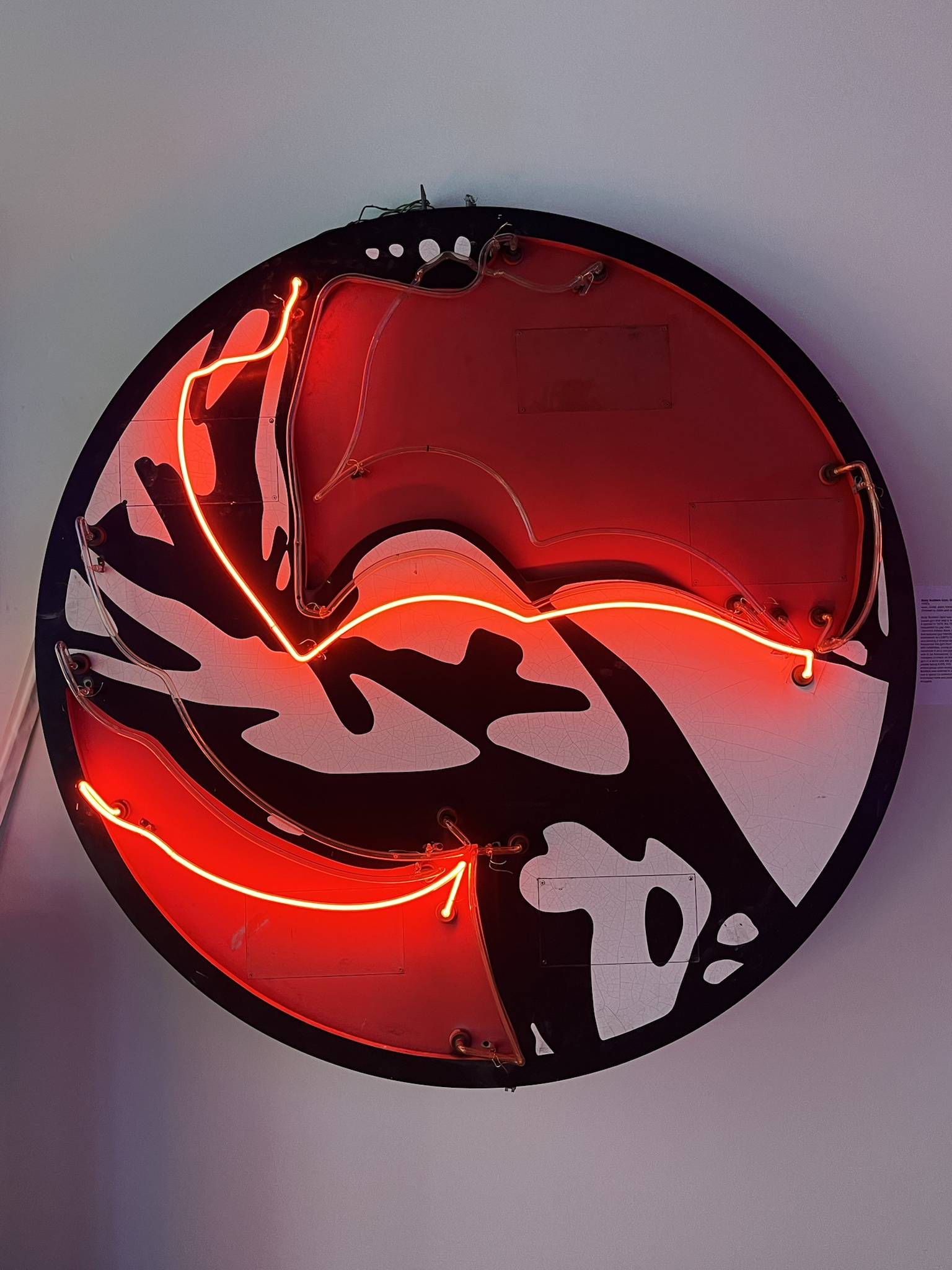
Animated sign from Body Builders Gym (1970s)

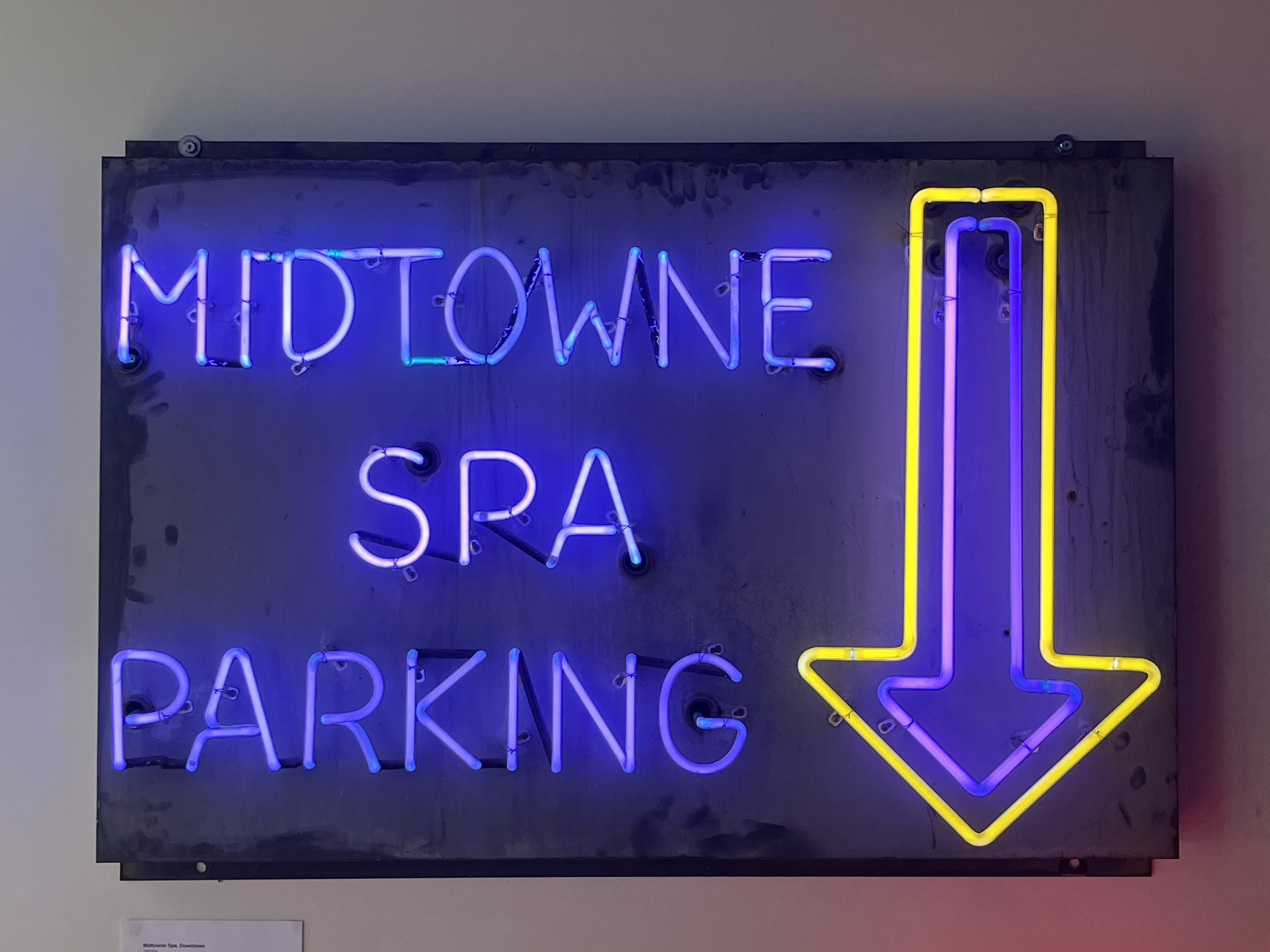
Neon sign from Midtowne Spa (1970s)

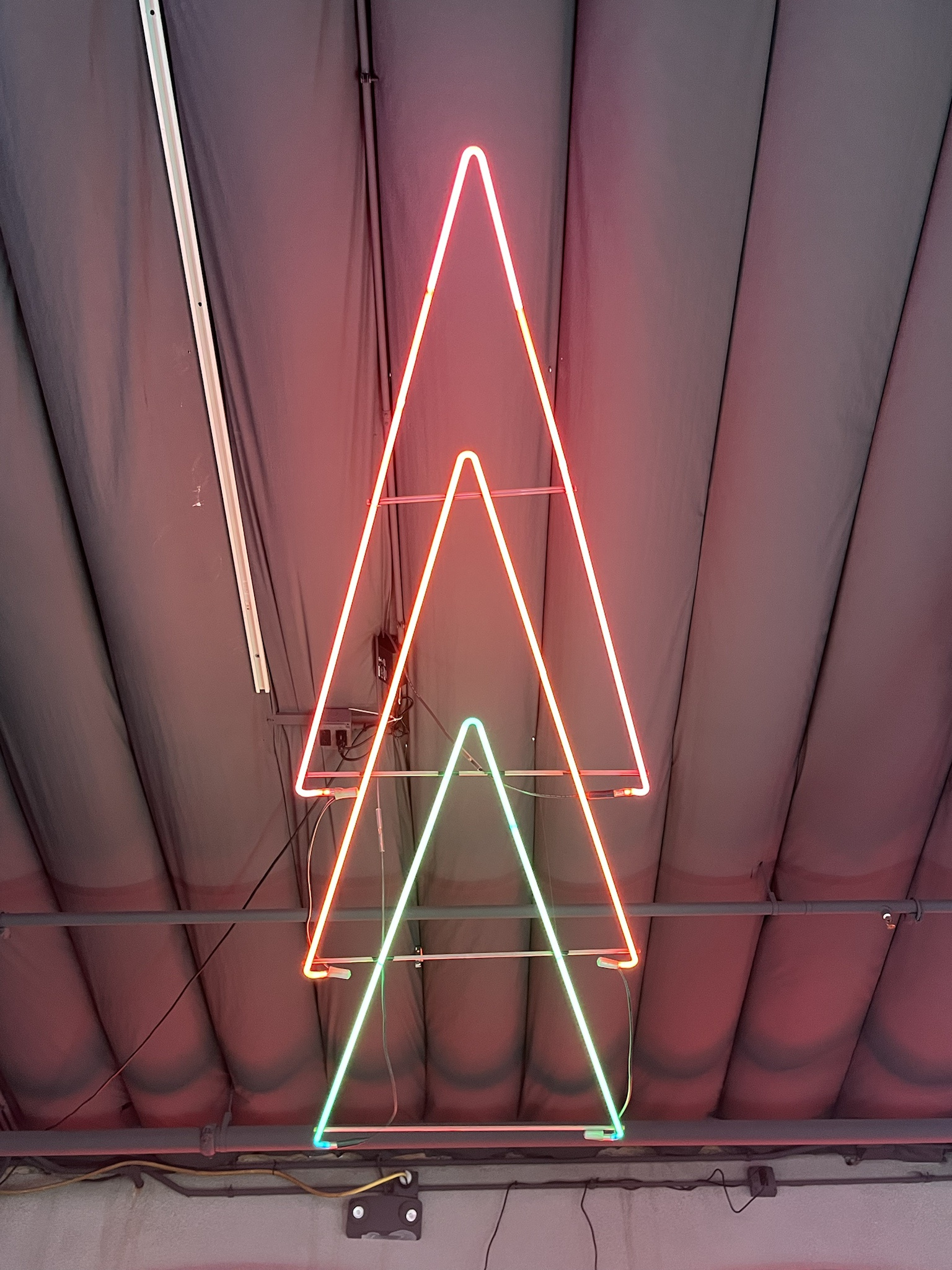
Architectural neon art from a hallway in Man's Country in Chicago (1970s)

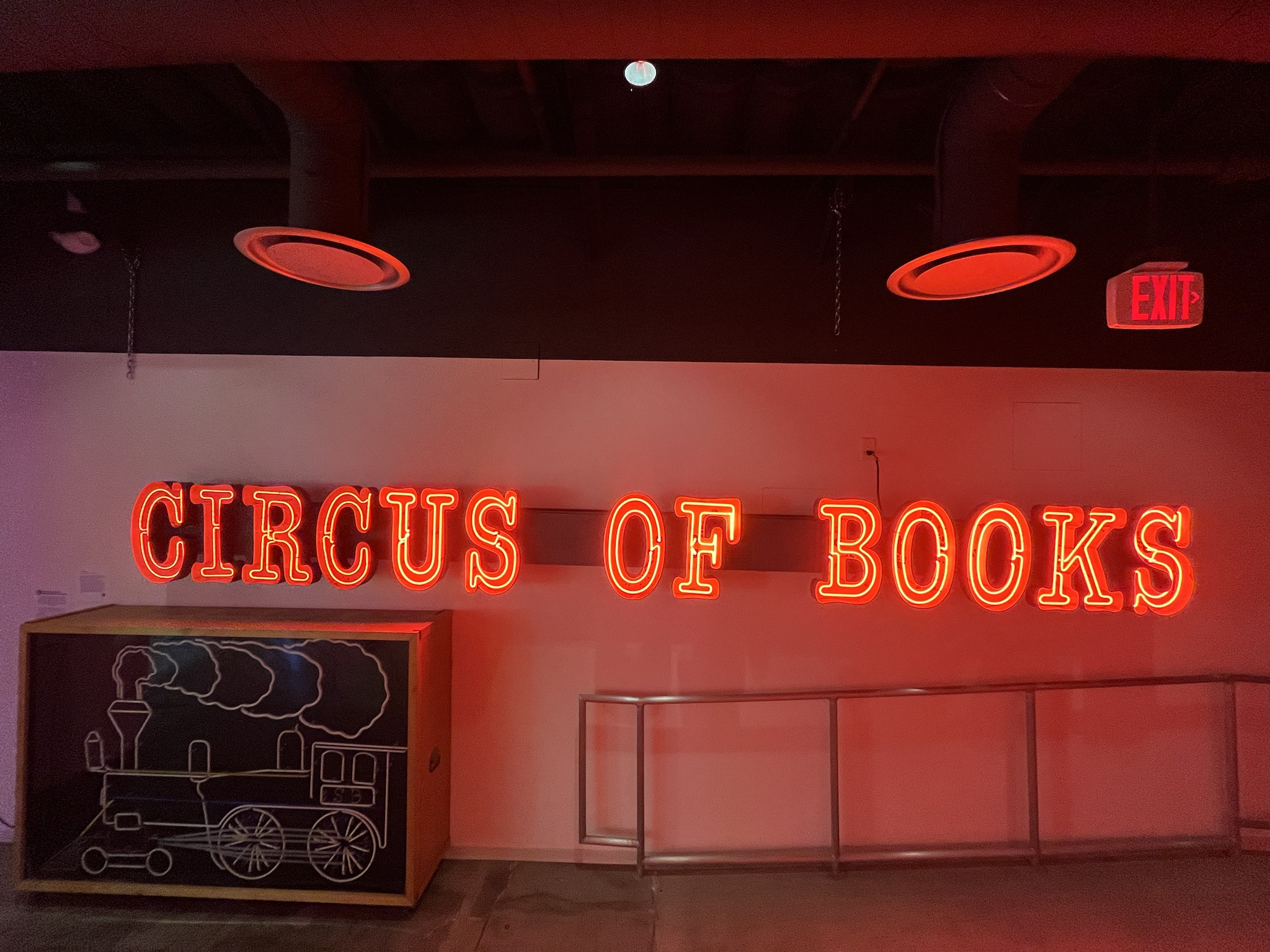
Sign from Circus of Books (1980s)
