= Roslin =

Roslin may refer to:

== Scotland ==
- Roslin, Midlothian (sometimes spelt Rosslyn or Roslyn), a village in Midlothian, south of Edinburgh, Scotland
  - Rosslyn Chapel
- Roslin Castle
- Roslin Institute, where Dolly the Sheep was cloned
- Battle of Roslin, 1303
- Barony of Roslin

== United States ==
- Roslin House, the Spanish House of Haverford College
- Roslin Art Gallery

== People ==
- Alexander Roslin (1718–1793), Swedish painter
- Gaby Roslin (born 1964), British television presenter
- Helisaeus Roeslin (1544–1616), German physician, astrologer and astronomer, 1544–1616
- Toros Roslin, 13th-century Armenian Byzantine-style manuscript illuminator (active 1256–1268)
- Roslin, Malayalam television and film actress (active 1983-present)

== Characters ==
- Laura Roslin, a main character from Battlestar Galactica
- Roslin Frey (also written as 'Roslyn'), a minor character from A Song of Ice and Fire

== See also ==
- Roslyn (disambiguation)
- Rosslyn (disambiguation)
