= Glendale Unified School District =

School district in California, United States

Location
- Glendale, California United States

District information
- Type: Public
- Grades: Pre K-12
- Superintendent: Dr. Darneika Watson
- Schools: 32
- Budget: $296.22 million

Students and staff
- Students: 26,744
- Teachers: 1,000

Other information
- Website: gusd.net

The Glendale Unified School District is a school district based in Glendale, California, United States. The school district serves the city of Glendale, portions of the city of La Cañada Flintridge and the unincorporated communities of Montrose and La Crescenta. It consists of 20 elementary schools, 4 middle schools, 4 high schools and 3 facilities for homeschoolers and special-needs students.

In the 2008–2009 school year, the district served 26,744 students and expects enrollment to decline 1–2% in each of the next three years. As of 2002, it was the third-largest district in Los Angeles County and among the thirty-largest in the State of California. It is the 254th largest in the nation by student population.

In 2009 the GUSD had 2,620 employees, of which about half are classroom teachers.

Beginning in the 2016–2017 school year, GUSD started officially commemorating the Armenian genocide, having April 24 off as a holiday. They are the first school district in the nation to do so.

== History ==
=== Early history (1879-1935) ===
In 1879, the now-defunct Sepulveda School District was formed to educate all children residing within the area of the former Rancho San Rafael.

The Glendale Union High School District was formed in 1901.

Glendale Junior College was founded in 1927 to serve the Glendale Union High School District.

=== Formation (1936) ===
Glendale schools reorganized as the Glendale Unified School District in 1936.

=== 21st Century (2000-Present) ===
==== Term limits ====
School Board member Shant Sahakian first proposed term limits for elected School Board members in May 2018, proposing that School Board members can serve a maximum of three, four-year terms, for a total of twelve years of service on the Board of Education. The Board of Education unanimously approved the proposal at a January 2022 meeting.

==== Anti-LGBTQ+ protests ====
In 2021, Tammy Tiber, a Glendale elementary school teacher, showed a video about celebrating LGBT pride to her third-grade class. This largely went unnoticed until Jordan Henry, a candidate for the Glendale City Council in 2022 and later a candidate for Glendale School Board Trustee Area A in 2024, received 1,300 pages of documents, including an email sent by Tiber regarding the lesson he had requested under public records law. After receiving threats, Tiber was involuntarily transferred from her classroom for safety reasons.

In May 2023, in response to a series of anti-LGBTQ+ protests in Glendale Unified School District and neighboring Los Angeles Unified School District, GALAS LGBTQ+ Armenian Society, glendaleOUT and Somos Familia Valle released a joint statement denouncing efforts by some parents to undermine LGBTQ+ content within school programming and curricula. Following an outbreak of violence at the June 6, 2023 Glendale Unified School District Board of Education meeting, GALAS, Armenian-American Action Network, and Southern California Armenian Democrats released a joint statement "calling attention to the collective safety of LGBTQ+ Armenians, the need for active allyship, and the dangers of alarmist and racist narratives about the Armenian immigrant population."

In response to the June 6, 2023 incident, the Glendale City Council requested that their staff prepare a report on the formation of a human rights commission. The report was presented in December 2023.

== Demographics ==
In the GUSD, by 1988, Armenians along with students from the Middle East had become the largest ethnic group in the public schools, now having a larger number than the Latinos. Alice Petrossian, the GUSD director of intercultural education, stated that Burbank lies within the middle of other Armenian communities, so it attracted Armenians. In 1987, the district had eight Armenian-speaking teachers and teaching aides, and that year had hired five additional Armenian-speaking teachers and teacher aides. As of 1990, the largest immigrant group speaking an ethnic home language in the GUSD was the Armenians. By 2004, over 33% of the Glendale district students were Armenian. That year, due to high levels of student absence around the Armenian Christmas (January 6) and the anniversary of the start of the Armenian genocide (Red Sunday, April 24), the district considered making Armenian holidays school holidays, eventually, starting in the 2016 year, the district started having April 24 off.

== Governance ==
The district is governed by a board of education consisting of five trustees who are elected to four-year terms. The Board of Education also appoints a superintendent to oversee day-to-day operations of the district, as well as a non-voting student representative who serves during the school year. Effective with the April 2017 election, board of education members are elected by geographical district instead of at-large. Starting with the 2020 California Primary election, Glendale Unified School District Board of Education election is being held on the first Tuesday after the first Monday in March to comply with the statewide election law (Senate Bill 415).

The current board of education is as follows:

- Dr. Darneika Watson – superintendent
- Ms. Ingrid Gunnell (Trustee Area B) – president
- Ms. Kathleen Cross (Trustee Area C) – vice president
- Mr. Telly Tse (Trustee Area A) – clerk
- Ms. Neda Farid (Trustee Area E) – member
- Mr. Shant Sahakian (Trustee Area D) – member

=== Election results ===
3 April 2007 elections to the board of education
Candidate	# of Votes	% of Vote	Elected
Todd Hunt	9,248	21.4
Naira Khachatrian	2,302	6.5
Elizabeth Manasserian	4,965	14.1
Nayiri Nahabedian	7,575	21.5	*
Hasmig Aslanian	1,732	4.9
Mary Boger	11,011	31.3	*

Source: City Clerk, City of Glendale

== Schools ==
=== Elementary schools (Kindergarten – Grade 6) ===
- Balboa Elementary School
- Cerritos Elementary School
- Columbus Elementary School (K-5th)
- Dunsmore Elementary School
- Thomas A. Edison Elementary School
- Benjamin Franklin Elementary School
- John C. Fremont Elementary School
- Glenoaks Elementary School
- Thomas Jefferson Elementary School
- Mark Keppel Visual and Performing Arts Magnet (K-5th)
- La Crescenta Elementary School
- Abraham Lincoln Elementary School
- Horace Mann Elementary School (K-5th)
- John Marshall Elementary School (K-5th)
- Monte Vista Elementary School
- Mountain Avenue Elementary School
- John Muir Elementary School
- Verdugo Woodlands Elementary School
- Valley View Elementary School
- Richardson D. White Elementary School (K-5th)

=== Middle schools (Grade 7 – Grade 8) ===
- Theodore Roosevelt Middle School (Grade 6 through Grade 8)
- Rosemont Middle School (Grade 7 and Grade 8)
- Eleanor J. Toll Middle School (Grade 6 through Grade 8)
- Woodrow Wilson Middle School (Grade 6 through Grade 8)

=== High schools (Grade 9 – Grade 12) ===
- Anderson W. Clark Magnet High School
- Crescenta Valley High School
- Glendale High School
- Herbert Hoover High School
- Allan F. Daily High School

=== Other schools ===
- College View School – special-needs students
- Verdugo Academy – independent/homeschool students
- Jewel City Community Day School - independent students

=== Preschools ===
- Cerritos Preschool
- Cloud Preschool
- Columbus Preschool
- Thomas Jefferson Preschool
- Horace Mann Preschool
- Pacific Avenue Preschool

== Safety ==
The district contracts with the Glendale Police Department for schools within Glendale, and the Los Angeles County Sheriff's Department for schools within Montrose and La Crescenta.

== 2023 Cyber Incident ==
In December 2023, the Glendale Unified School District fell victim to a ransomware attack carried out by the Medusa Ransomware Group. The attack compromised the personal information of both students and staff. Attackers locked employees out of their systems and demanded a ransom for the safe return of sensitive PII and other confidential data, which included Social Security numbers, addresses, and financial information. The district chose not to pay the ransom, resulting in the sensitive data being publicly exposed online. This incident is part of a growing trend of cyberattacks targeting K-12 institutions, disrupting school operations and endangering personal data.

== Cybersurveillance of students ==
In 2012, the District hired Geo Listening for a pilot program to monitor public online activity of students at the Crescenta Valley, Glendale, and Hoover High Schools. While the school district has claimed that the program, now expanded to all of the District's schools, is meant to detect cyberbullying, critics have questioned whether it violates the privacy rights of students and whether the $40,500 spent on the program so far is well spent.

Analysts working for Geo Listening comb through posts students from Glendale Unified School District schools make on Facebook, Twitter and Instagram, reporting daily to school administrators. Reports include the student's user names, screen captures of their posts, and details on where they were when they made the post. An attorney with the ACLU characterized the program as "sweeping and far afield of what is necessary to ensure student safety."
