= Right Side NGO =

Armenian transgender rights organization

- Right Side Human Rights Defender NGO
- Իրավունքի Կողմ
- Founded: 2016; 10 years ago
- Legal status: Non-governmental organization
- Purpose: Transgender rights, Sex workers' rights, LGBT rights in Armenia, LGBT activism
- Headquarters: Yerevan
- Location: Armenia
- Methods: Advocacy
- Director: Lilit Martirosyan
- Main organ: General Assembly
- Affiliations: Transgender Europe
- Website: rightsidengo.com

Right Side NGO (Armenian: Իրավունքի Կողմ, romanized: iravunki koghm) is the first transgender rights organization in Armenia and the first trans-led organization in the South Caucasus region. Right Side NGO was founded in 2016 as a non-governmental organization and is headquartered in Yerevan. Its mission is to serve and support the needs of transgender individuals and sex workers in Armenia, to promote their human rights protection, and to advocate for the change of public policy around transgender and sex work issues.

== Organization ==
Right Side NGO was founded on 25 January 2016 by Lilit Martirosyan, an Armenian LGBTQ+ rights activist. The organization seeks to promote human rights protection for transgender citizens and for transgender sex workers and other sex workers in Armenia. The organization additionally supports creating a more equitable and tolerant society, increasing knowledge of health and safety for sex workers, raising HIV prevention awareness, challenging negative stigmas, and advocating for legal reforms and labour rights.

The NGO also provides legal, social, and psychological services to the community, holds annual "trans camp" events, vocational education trainings and courses, capacity building workshops and seminars, and various awareness raising campaigns throughout Armenia. The organization works closely with Pink Armenia on related LGBTQ+ matters, including advocating for easier gender self-identification.

== International cooperation ==
Right Side NGO has established cooperative relations with diplomatic missions, United Nations agencies, the Council of Europe, and other intergovernmental, non-governmental, international, local organizations and networks. Right Side NGO is a member of the European Sex Workers' Rights Alliance.

== Activities ==
On 16 May 2016, the NGO commemorated the International Day Against Homophobia, Biphobia and Transphobia.

The Right Side NGO was awarded a grant from the European Endowment for Democracy to advance equality for transgender people in Armenia and raise awareness of the issues they face.

In collaboration with ILGA-Europe, Right Side NGO implemented a data collection project exclusively focusing on hate crimes, violence, and discrimination faced by the transgender community.

In 2019, the NGO hosted the first "Gender equality and diversity cultural festival" in Armenia as a pre-event for Armenia's first ever pride parade, which was planned to be held in 2021.

On 11 January 2019, the NGO announced that it will assist trans citizens of Armenia to acquire new Armenian passports with names which are in line with the persons gender identity and expression. The NGO confirmed that several citizens have already obtained new passports and that the NGO has received funding from the European Foundation for Democracy.

In 2020, Lilit Martirosyan was awarded the Human Rights Tulip of the year during a ceremony organized by the Government of the Netherlands on Human Rights Day.

Also in 2020, the NGO began cooperation with the HPLGBT organization in Ukraine and with Tbilisi Pride in Georgia, with the goal to increase activism and promote human rights in Eastern Europe.

In March 2022, the organization participated in a panel discussion organized by the GALAS LGBTQ+ Armenian Society.

On 3 September 2022, a new safe space office for the LGBTQ community was opened in Yerevan by the Right Side NGO with support from the Swedish embassy in Armenia. The opening ceremony was attended by several ambassadors and the Human Rights Defender of Armenia, Kristinne Grigoryan.

In February and March 2023, Right Side NGO representatives went on a working visit to the United States, and met with organizations such as the National Endowment for Democracy, Urgent Action Fund for Women's Human Rights, Human Rights Campaign, Global Fund for Women, Freedom House, Astraea Lesbian Foundation For Justice, and the National Democratic Institute. GALAS LGBTQ+ Armenian Society hosted Right Side NGO founder Lilit Martirosyan in Glendale, California for a public discussion on the situation of LGBTQ+ people in Armenia, discrimination and human rights violations, and how supporters living in the United States can support LGBTQ+ people living in Armenia.

On 21 August 2023, at a candlelight vigil for a murdered trans woman named Adriana, organized by Right Side in Komitas Park in Yerevan, more than 100 LGBTQ+ activists gathered, along with Adriana's family, the Dutch ambassador to Armenia and a representative from the British embassy. The vigil was disrupted by a group of agitators who threw eggs, bottles, and stones at the mourners. Police officers, who had gathered in the park in preparation for the vigil, did not intervene.

== Leadership ==
As of November 2022, the Right Side NGO governing board is composed of five activists, including two trans women, two trans men, and one non-binary person who govern the organization. In addition, three of the board members are sex workers.

== See also ==
- Equality Armenia
- Human rights in Armenia
- LGBT rights in Armenia
- List of LGBT Armenians
- List of sex worker organizations
- List of transgender-rights organizations
- Prostitution in Armenia
- Recognition of same-sex unions in Armenia
- Social issues in Armenia
