= LGBTQ rights in Armenia =

- Location of Armenia (green) in Europe (dark grey) – [Legend]
- Legal status: Legal since 2003
- Military: LGBT people are not allowed to serve openly
- Discrimination protections: No law prohibiting discrimination based on sexual orientation

Family rights
- Recognition of relationships: No
- Restrictions: Same-sex marriage constitutionally banned
- Adoption: Same-sex couples are not allowed to adopt

Lesbian, gay, bisexual, and transgender (LGBT) people in Armenia face legal and social challenges not experienced by non-LGBT residents, due in part to the lack of laws prohibiting discrimination on the grounds of sexual orientation and gender identity and in part to prevailing negative attitudes about LGBT persons throughout society.

Homosexuality has been legal in Armenia since 2003. However, even though it has been decriminalized, the situation of local lesbian, gay, bisexual, and transgender (LGBT) citizens has not changed substantially. Many LGBT Armenians fear being socially outcast by their friends and families, causing them to keep their sexual orientation or gender identity secret, except to a few family members and friends.

Homosexuality remains a taboo topic in many parts of Armenian society. In a 2012 study, 55% of correspondents in Armenian stated that they would cease their relationship with a friend or relative if they were to come out as gay. Furthermore, this study found that 70% of Armenians find LGBT people to be "strange". There is, moreover, no legal protection for LGBT persons whose human rights are frequently violated.

In 2011, Armenia signed the "joint statement on ending acts of violence and related human rights violations based on sexual orientation and gender identity" at the United Nations, condemning violence and discrimination against LGBT people.

Since 2023, the Human Rights Defender of Armenia's annual report has included a focus on LGBT+ rights.

In 2025, ILGA-Europe ranked Armenia 46th out of 49 European countries for the protection of LGBT rights, with no change compared to the previous years.

== Legality of same-sex sexual activity ==
=== Sodomy laws ===
==== Soviet Armenia ====
On 7 March 1934, Article 121 was added to the criminal code of the Soviet Union. It expressly prohibited male homosexuality, punishing it with penalties of up to five years in prison.

==== Independent Armenia ====
In 1999, a man was sentenced to three months of imprisonment for having sex with another man. He was the last to be condemned under anti-sodomy laws. In his testimony, he denounced prison guard abuse and mistreatment but also the corrupt judge who shortened his sentence for a $1,000 bribe. The mediatization or publicizing of his case signaled the first gay "coming out" in Armenia.

The abolition of the anti-gay law along with the death penalty was among Armenia's pre-accession conditions to the Council of Europe in 2001. In December 2002, the National Assembly approved the new penal code in which the anti-gay article was removed. On 1 August 2003, President of Armenia Robert Kocharyan ratified it, thus making Armenia the last Council of Europe member state where same-sex sexual activity was decriminalized.

=== Age of consent ===
The age of consent is 16, regardless of gender and sexual orientation.

== Recognition of same-sex relationships ==
Laws regarding same-sex partnerships in Europe¹ Marriage Civil union Limited domestic recognition (cohabitation) Unrecognized Constitution limits marriage to opposite-sex couples ¹ May include recent laws or court decisions that have not yet entered into effect.

Same-sex marriage and civil unions are not legal in Armenia and the Constitution limits marriage to opposite-sex couples.

In December 2017, Father Vazken Movsesian, serving in the Diocese of the West, based in California, expressed his personal support for same-sex marriage, becoming one of the most high-profile supporters of same-sex marriage in the church. Other supporters include organisation Equality Armenia, whose goal is "achieving marriage equality in Armenia".

In November 2018, the Armenian Government rejected a bill proposed by MP Tigran Urikhanyan to introduce further prohibitions on same-sex marriage.

On 26 August 2019, the Minister of Justice, Rustam Badasyan, stated that Armenia does not recognize same-sex marriage.

== Discrimination protections ==
Although Armenia was among the first nations in the region to endorse the UN declaration on sexual orientation and gender identity in December 2008, as of 2026, there is no legislation protecting LGBT individuals from discrimination and hate crime. A 2011 survey revealed that 50% of Armenians would "walk away indifferently" if they witnessed violence against an LGBT person, underscoring the deeply ingrained cultural opposition to homosexuality.

Many LGBT individuals report fearing violence in their workplace or from their family, leading to underreporting of human rights violations and criminal offences. As a result, reported incidents of discrimination, harassment, or hate crimes likely underestimate their true prevalence.

ILGA-Europe conducts activities related to advancing LGBT rights in Armenia through seven NGO's and civil societies based in Armenia.

In a 2024 statement on anti-discrimination legislation in Armenia, the Parliamentary Assembly of the Council of Europe appealed to the Armenian Government and Parliament to ensure the protection of the rights of LGBTI people, proposing the following recommendations:

- the explicit inclusion of sexual orientation, gender identity and/or expression and sex characteristics, as protection grounds;
- the inclusion of a provision, allowing human rights organizations to bring claims related to the protection of public interest;
- the establishment of an independent equality body, empowered by the Parliament, to oversee and address discrimination cases.

On 30 January 2024, the administrative court of Yerevan ruled in favor of granting Salman Mukayev, a Russian citizen from Chechnya, asylum and refugee status. Fearing persecution for homosexuality in Chechnya, Mukayev applied for asylum in Armenia. The courts decision was based on concerns over the repressive treatment of the LGBT community in both Chechnya and Russia.

At Pink Armenia's 2025 IDAHOBIT event, the Human Rights Defender's office confirmed their commitment to monitor the situation of LGBT+ rights, respond to violations, and enhance institutional responses.

The gradual European integration of Armenia will encourage the alignment of Armenian law to EU norms and standards. Armenia's accession to the European Union will require the adoption of anti-discrimination laws ensuring equal rights for all, including the LGBT+ community. On 2 December 2025, Armenia and the European Union adopted a new strategic agenda which explicitly calls on Armenia to combat anti-LGBT+ discrimination and hate crimes.

As of January 2026, Pink Armenia has been granted consultative status by four government ministries: the Ministry of Health, the Ministry of Internal Affairs, the Ministry of Justice and the Ministry of Labor and Social Affairs.

In February 2026, Michael O'Flaherty, the Council of Europe's Commissioner for Human Rights, recommended that Armenia adopt anti-discrimination legislation which includes sexual orientation and gender identity.

== Military service ==
Since 2001, due to defence ministry Order No. 378, homosexuality has been considered an illness and homosexuals unfit for military service. Since 2018, a health ministry decree, which exempts individuals with a "personality disorder" from conscription, has frequently been applied to LGBTQ individuals. In practice, gay men who disclose their sexuality during the conscription process often face additional and invasive psychiatric examination.

Homosexuals enlisted in the military have reported being given a separate set of tableware, being forced to live in restrooms, and being forced to clean restrooms. In extreme cases, some have been subjected to physical violence or sexual assault by other soldiers.

== Living conditions ==
=== LGBTQ Culture ===
Most LGBTQ-friendly spaces in Armenia are in Yerevan's center, particularly near the opera house and the Cascade.

Following the 2018 Armenian Revolution, a nascent underground clubbing culture has blossomed in Yerevan, with queer events at venues such as Relokant and the now-closed Poligraf.

In the wake of the 2022 Russo-Ukrainian war, there has been an influx of LGBTQ Russians into Yerevan. Concurrently, the capital has also seen the development of ballroom and drag communities.

=== Anti-LGBTQ discrimination ===
==== Discrimination by media ====
On 17 May 2014, the Iravunk newspaper published an article with a list of dozens of people's Facebook accounts from the Armenian LGBT community, calling them "zombies" and accused them of serving the interest of the international homosexual lobby. The newspaper was sued and taken before the Armenian Court of Appeals, where the judges found that the newspaper did not offend anybody and ordered the plaintiffs to pay 50,000 dram (US$120) as compensation to the newspaper and its editor, Hovhannes Galajyan.

==== Discrimination by police ====
Following the 2004 killing of openly gay American Joshua Haglund in Yerevan, the response of the Yerevan's police was denounced as "unethical, immoral." Investigators initially sought to present the killing as a crime of passion, arresting and briefly jailing several of Haglund's local gay acquaintances. Haglund's family's attorneys insisted that Armenian law enforcement authorities badly mistreated gay men and deliberately ignored key facts.

A 2017 report by the United States Department of State noted arbitrary arrest and detention, physical interference against freedom of assembly, and failure to protect LGBT+ individuals from violence.

In April 2023, police raided Poligraf, a prominent nightclub in Yerevan known as a safe space for Armenia's LGBTQ+ community, detaining over forty individuals. Pink Armenia has condemned the incident, with chairperson Lilit Avetisyan stating, "They laid all those present on the ground, used violence, took everyone to the police department, and started mocking them, mainly based on their clothing and sexual orientation."

A 2025 Pink Armenia report highlights the LGBT+ community's declining trust in law enforcement agencies.

As of 2025, the Council of Europe is providing training to police officers, prosecutors and investigators to identify and investigate hate-motivated incidents on the grounds of sexual orientation, gender identity and expression, and sex characteristics (SOGIESC), in line with Council of Europe standards and the case law of the European Court of Human Rights.

==== Discrimination by politicians ====
In 2004, Presidential Advisor for National Security Garnik Isagulyan stated that parliamentarians found to be gay should resign.

In 2010, Yerevan mayor Gagik Beglaryan ordered police officers to use force against suspected homosexuals and "transvestites" who gathered in a park adjacent to the mayor's office.

In the wake of the 2018 revolution, conservative politicians made LGBT+ rights a campaign issue in an attempt to discredit the new government. In response, prime minister Nikol Pashinyan stated that "The LGBT issue is always a headache for a government."

==== Discrimination by religious authorities ====
In 2019, the Armenian Apostolic Church issued a statement opposing ratification of the Istanbul Convention on Preventing and Combating Violence Against Women and Domestic Violence on the grounds that the convention recognized rights for transgender individuals.

==== Violence ====
In May 2012, suspected "Neo-Nazis" launched two arson attacks at a lesbian-owned pub in Armenia's capital, Yerevan. Armenian News reported that in the second attack on 15 May, a group of young men arrived at the gay DIY Rock Pub around 6pm, where they burned the bar's "No to Fascism" poster and drew the Nazi Swastika on the walls. This followed another attack on 8 May in which a petrol bomb was thrown through the Rock Pub's window.

In May 2018, while in Armenia on a humanitarian mission, Elton John was subjected to homophobic slurs and eggs were hurled at him. According to the photojournalist, 2 eggs hit Elton John. The suspect was later released by the police.

In August 2018, nine LGBT activists were violently attacked by a mob at a private home in the town of Shurnukh, sending two of them to hospital for serious injuries. The violent attack received widespread media coverage, and was condemned by human rights groups and the U.S. embassy. The attackers were later released by the police.

On 21 August 2023, at a candlelight vigil for a murdered trans woman named Adriana, organized by Right Side NGO in Komitas Park in Yerevan, more than 100 LGBTQ+ activists gathered, along with Adriana's family, the Dutch ambassador to Armenia and a representative from the British embassy. The vigil was disrupted by a group of agitators who threw eggs, bottles, and stones at the mourners. Police officers, who had gathered in the park in preparation for the vigil, did not intervene.

Amnesty International's 2024 report on Armenia notes that in June 2024, staff in the office of the Human Rights Defender of Armenia reported being subjected to threats, harassment and verbal abuse, particularly for their work with LGBT+ individuals.

=== Freedom of speech and expression ===
In 2013, the Armenian police proposed a bill outlawing "non-traditional sexual relationships" and the promotion of LGBT "propaganda" to youth in a law similar to the Russian anti-gay law. Ashot Aharonian, a police spokesperson, stated that the bill was proposed due to the public's fear of the spreading of homosexuality. However, NGOs including Pink Armenia claimed that this was an attempt to distract the public from various sociopolitical issues within the country. The bill ultimately failed to pass.

In 2017, organizers of the Yerevan International Film Festival canceled the screening of two LGBT+-themed films after negative public reaction.

In November 2018, a Christian LGBT group had to cancel several forums and events it had planned due to "constant threats" and "organized intimidation" from political and religious leaders, as well as a "lack of sufficient readiness" from the police force to protect them.

== LGBTQ rights movement in Armenia ==
LGBTQ rights organisations in Armenia include Pink Armenia and Right Side NGO.

Following the 2003 abolition of the anti-sodomy law, some sporadic signs of an emerging LGBT rights movement were observed in Armenia. In October 2003, a group of 15 LGBT people gathered in Yerevan to set up an organization which was initially baptised GLAG (Gay and Lesbian Armenian Group). But after several meetings, the participants failed to achieve their goal.

During the 2018 Armenian Revolution, Mamikon Hovespyan, Director of Pink Armenia, stated "while LGBT+ people were present at previous protests, this time they were more visible and accepted."

On 5 April 2019, a transgender woman, Lilit Martirosyan, took the floor at the National Assembly of Armenia and talked about the hopes for a better and more secure future for the LGBT community in Armenia. Her speech marked the first time in the history of Armenia that a transgender person had spoken in the National Assembly. She expressed solidarity with the marginalized transgender community in Armenia. In response, anti-LGBT protests were held outside the parliament building, along with verbal attacks by parliamentary members. Martirosyan said she had received numerous death threats via Facebook and email. The European Union delegation in Armenia, along with the embassies of EU member states, condemned the threats against Martirosyan in a joint statement. The United Nations office in Yerevan also expressed concern over the recent situation "against human rights and LGBT activists.” In response, Armenia’s Foreign Ministry spokeswoman, Anna Naghdalyan, called on foreign diplomats to “demonstrate more respect and sensitivity towards Armenian society” and to “refrain from undue engagement in the public debate.” In February 2020, a member of an Armenian nationalist party tried to "clean up" Armenia's National Assembly. "Since the lectern of the National Assembly has been desecrated," Sona Aghekyan announced, "I'm going to burn incense here." Aghekyan was referring to transgender activist Lilit Martirosyan, who made a brief speech in parliament from the same lectern in 2019.

=== LGBTQ rights movement in the Armenian diaspora ===
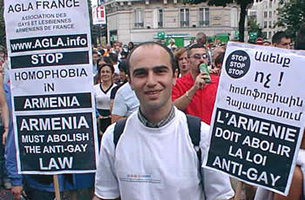
A French Armenian calling for the repeal of the anti-gay law in 2002

In 1998, the Armenian Gay and Lesbian Association of New York was founded to support LGBT diasporan Armenians. A similar group was also established in France.

Other LGBT+ groups include the GALAS LGBTQ+ Armenian Society and Equality Armenia, both based in Los Angeles, United States.

In June 2023, conservative Armenian-Americans organized large-scale anti-LGBT+ protests in Glendale, California, a city home to a large Armenian community. Speaking to the Los Angeles Times on condition of anonymity, one parent voiced her exhaustion, stating that she was tired "of gay propaganda". She added, "I didn't come from Armenia for this," citing that her child had brought home rainbow-colored stickers and other items from school just the week before.

== Public opinion ==
A 2016 study by the Heinrich Böll Foundation found that only 9% of respondents knew anyone who was LGBT and 90% agreed with the statement, "Homosexual relationships should be banned by law".

According to a June 2015-June 2016 survey by the Pew Research Center, 96% of Armenians opposed same-sex marriage, with only 3% supporting it.

In May 2017, a survey by the Pew Research Center in Eastern European countries showed that 97% of Armenians believed that homosexuality should not be accepted by society.

According to a 2022 survey by the World Values Survey, 85% of Armenians believed that "homosexuality is never justified". The same survey found that 82% of Armenians "would not like to have homosexuals as neighbors".

== Summary table ==
Same-sex sexual activity legal	Yes (Since 2003)
Equal age of consent (16)	Yes (Since 2003)
Anti-discrimination laws in employment only	No
Anti-discrimination laws in the provision of goods and services	No
Anti-discrimination laws in education	No
Anti-discrimination laws in all other areas (incl. indirect discrimination, hate speech)	No
Hate crime laws include sexual orientation and gender identity	No
Same-sex marriage legal	No (Constitutional ban since 2015)
Stepchild adoption by same-sex couples	No
Joint adoption by same-sex couples	No
Adoption by single people regardless of sexual orientation	No
Foster care by same-sex couples	No
LGBT people allowed to serve openly in the military	No (Since 2004)
Right to change legal gender	Yes
Third gender option	No
Intersex minors protected from invasive surgical procedures	No
Conversion therapy banned by law	No
Gay panic defense banned by law	No
Access to IVF for lesbians	No
Automatic parenthood for both spouses after birth	No
Altruistic surrogacy for gay male couples	No
MSM allowed to donate blood	Yes (Since 2023)

== See also ==
- Helsinki Citizens’ Assembly–Vanadzor
- Human rights in Armenia
- ILGA-Europe
- LGBTQ rights by country or territory
- LGBTQ rights in Europe
- LGBTQ rights in Asia
- Pink Armenia
- Recognition of same-sex unions in Armenia
- Recognition of same-sex unions in Europe
- Right Side NGO
- Social issues in Armenia
