= Nancy Agabian =

American writer, activist and teacher

Nancy Agabian is an American writer, activist, and teacher, a lecturer at New York University, Gallatin. She is of Armenian origin and her memoir about her childhood, Me as Her Again: True Stories of an Armenian Daughter, won Lambda Literary's Jeanne Córdova Prize for Lesbian/Queer Nonfiction.

== Career ==
Agabian is an Armenian-American writer, who studied at Columbia University's School of the Arts. In 2000, she published a collection of essays, poetry, and non-fiction pieces titled Princess Freak (Beyond Baroque). In 2008, she published a memoir, titled Me as her again: True Stories of an Armenian Daughter (Aunt Lute Books). The memoir was shortlisted for the Lambda Literary Award for Nonfiction in 2009, was shortlisted for the William Saroyan International Prize, and won the Jeanne Cordova Prize for Lesbian/Queer Non-fiction in 2021. In 2006, she received a Fulbright Fellowship as well as a Lambda Literary Fellowship in 2012, to write about Armenian identity and history. Agabian has written a novel, The Fear of Large and Small Nations (Nauset Press) about the Armenian diaspora, based on her research conducted during her Fulbright Fellowship, which was shortlisted for the 2016 PEN/Bellwether Prize for Socially Engaged Fiction.

Agabian teaches creative writing at The Gallatin School of Individualized Study, New York University, and at The Leslie-Lohman Museum of Gay and Lesbian Art in New York. She has also worked to promote and preserve Armenian writing in America.

Agabian is a member of International Armenian Literary Alliance's board of directors.

== Activism ==
=== LGBTQ+ rights ===
Agabian has spoken out against anti-LGBT Armenians protesting against the Glendale Unified School District, stating

It felt like, all this is going down in Artsakh, but you guys are attacking your queer brothers and sisters? Have you lost your souls? And by the way, you’re going to waste the Glendale school district’s time with this foolishness when children need education? You’re being co-opted by white nationalists. So, good job. Good job as an American, and as an Armenian. That’s really effective activity. You’ll forgive my sarcasm.

Further, Agabian has warned against the stereotyping of Armenians as anti-LGBT, stating

Some of the dialogue around the issue was like, “Oh, it’s just the Armenian families.” And so, there was this anti-Armenian rhetoric, connecting us only to homophobia when in fact GALAS exists as an advocacy organization, a beacon for homophile Armenians all over the world. GALAS insisted, “Don’t erase us.” We’re not a monolith. We have gay folks, trans folks, and straight folks, too, who support having a safe space for every Armenian kid and their families. Some of the bigoted Armenians who are railing against us—what are they going to do when their child comes out? Don’t they want a safe space for them? We all would’ve wanted that for ourselves. We know the harm it’s done.

== Bibliography ==
- Me as Her Again (Aunt Lute Books, 2008) ISBN 9781939904041
- Princess Freak: Poems and Performances (Beyond Baroque Books, 2000) ISBN 1892184079
- (edited) Fierce: Essays by and about Dauntless Women (Nauset Press, 2019) ISBN 0990715450
- The Fear of Large and Small Nations (Nauset Press, 2022) ISBN 9798985969238

== Awards and honors ==
Year	Award	For	Reference
2021	Jeanne Cordova Prize for Lesbian/Queer Non-fiction	Me as Her Again	
2016	PEN/Bellwether Prize for Socially Engaged Fiction	The Fear of Large and Small Nations	
	Shortlisted, William Saroyan International Prize	Me as Her Again	
2009	Shortlisted, Lambda Literary Award for Nonfiction	Me as Her Again	
