= Roslyn =

Roslyn may refer to:

== People ==
- Louis Frederick Roslyn (1878–1940), British sculptor
- Roslyn Atkins (born 1974), British journalist and broadcaster for the BBC

== Places ==
- Roslyn, Palmerston North, a suburb of the city of Palmerston North, North Island, New Zealand
- Roslyn, Dunedin, a suburb of the city of Dunedin, South Island, New Zealand
- Roslyn (New Zealand electorate), a former electorate
- Roslyn, New York, a village on the North Shore of Long Island in Nassau County, New York, United States
- Roslyn, Pennsylvania, a community in Montgomery County, Pennsylvania, United States
- Roslyn, South Dakota, a town in Day County, South Dakota United States
- Roslyn, Washington, a city in Kittitas County, Washington, United States
- Roslyn, a fictional English seaside town in the novel Eric, or, Little by Little (1858)

== Computing ==
- Roslyn (compiler), Microsoft's language tooling for C# and Visual Basic .NET

== Transportation ==
- Roslyn station (Pittsburgh Regional Transit), a bus rapid transit station in Pittsburgh, Pennsylvania, USA
- Roslyn station (SEPTA), a SEPTA Regional Rail station in Roslyn, Pennsylvania, USA
- Roslyn station (LIRR), a Long Island Rail Road station in Roslyn, New York, USA
- Roslyn railway station, New South Wales, a railway station in Roslyn, New South Wales, Australia
- North Roslyn station (LIRR), former Long Island Rail Road station

== See also ==
- Roslyn Air National Guard Station, a former 40-acre (160,000 m^{2}) Air National Guard Station in Roslyn, New York, United States
- Roslyn Overbridge, a bridge in Dunedin, New Zealand
- Roslin (disambiguation)
  - Roslin, Midlothian, sometimes spelt Rosslyn or Roslyn
- Rosalyn (disambiguation)
- Rosslyn (disambiguation)
