= Julia Sedefdjian =

French chef

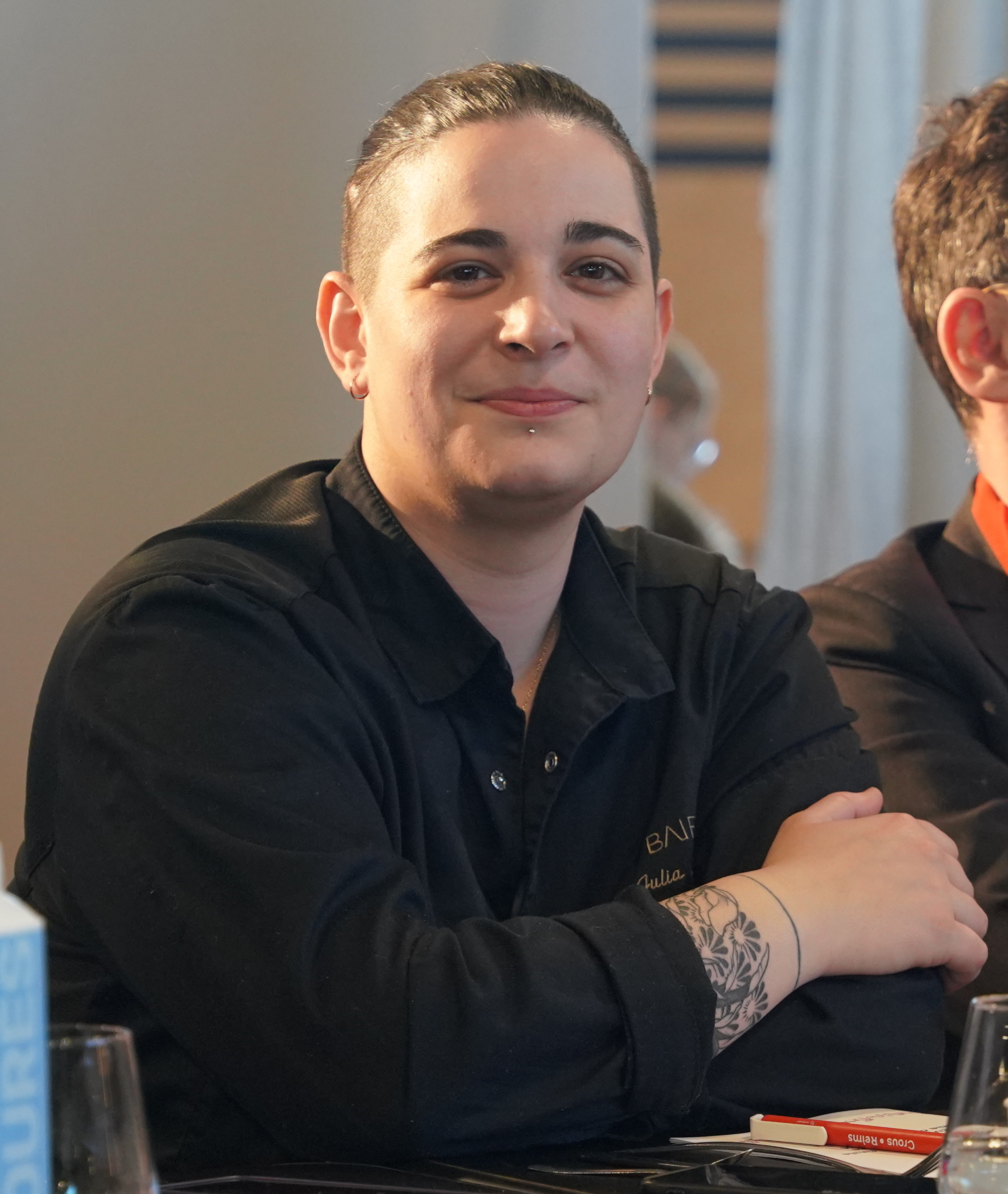
- Born: December 26, 1994 (age 31); Nice, France
- Occupation: Chef
- Culinary career
- Cooking style: French; Mediterranean
- Rating
- Michelin stars
- Current restaurants
- La Baieta, Paris

Julia Sedefdjian (born 1994, in Nice, France) is a French chef.

== Early life and training ==
Sedefdjian was born in Nice, in the Alpes-Maritimes of France, on 26 December 1994 to a real estate agent father of Armenian descent and a radiologist mother of Sicilian ancestry. She has two brothers.

After abandoning her veterinarian studies, she entered, at fourteen years of age, in 2009, the École hôtelière de Nice. She obtained a Certificat d'aptitude professionnelle in cooking and then in pastry, and started working as an apprentice at the Aphrodite restaurant of Nice under controversial chef David Faure, where she learned about molecular cuisine.

In 2012, she won first prize in the regional competition for "Best Apprentice".

== Career ==
In 2012, she moved to Paris, where she found administrative work at the Michelin starred Les Fables de La Fontaine restaurant and, within one year, she was appointed sous-chef under Anthony David. In 2015, following David's departure, Sedefdjian took up the top position.

At Les Fables de La Fontaine, and after her total revision of the menu, she retained the restaurant's Michelin star in 2016, becoming the youngest ever chef to win the award.

After two years directing the Fontaine cuisine, Sedefdjian, taking with her sous-chef Sébastien Jean-Joseph and manager Gregory Anelka, left to open La Baieta (Note: "La Baieta" means "the kiss" in the Nice dialect.) in the city's 5th arrondissement. Her menu offers Mediterranean cuisine.

In 2019, La Baieta earned one Michelin star, making Sedefdjian the youngest French chef to ever receive one.

== Personal life ==
Sedefdjian is a lesbian and lives with her partner, Adélie. In 2021, they had a child born by Adélie through assisted reproductive technology in Portugal. (Note: In France, the procedure was not yet legally extended to lesbian couples or single women. See The Guardian (2021).)

== See also ==
- List of female chefs with Michelin stars
- Anthony Bourdain
