= Anoush Ellah =

Canadian drag performer

Aren Adamian
- Occupation: Drag queen
- Years active: 2021–present

Aren Adamian, better known by their stage name Anoush Ellah, is a Canadian drag performer from Toronto, Ontario. "Anoush Ellah" is an Armenian saying meaning "let it be sweet".

== Career ==
Anoush Ellah's first public drag performance occurred in April 2021 at a virtual Cher-themed fundraiser for the Armenian victims of the Second Nagorno-Karabakh War, entitled "Cher the Love for Artsakh".

In December 2022, Anoush Ellah performed in San Francisco at a show entitled "Try, Hye!" ("Try, Armenian!"), part of CounterPulse's "Performing Diaspora" artist residency program.

In September 2023, Anoush Ellah performed at GALAS LGBTQ+ Armenian Society's twenty-fifth anniversary gala in Glendale, America. Their performance, which included traditional Armenian dress, caused outrage among anti-LGBT+ Armenians. Before the event had ended, their performance went viral on social media, with criticism that they had disrespected Armenian culture and womanhood.

In October 2023, Anoush Ellah was featured in Stories Untold: Meet Queer SWANA Sex Workers and Drag Performers, a documentary about queer SWANA sex workers and drag performers, which debuted at One Institute's "Circa: Queer Histories Festival".

Anoush Ellah has performed at Pride Toronto, and is a regular performer at "Hoebibi", an event featuring Middle Eastern drag artists in Toronto. Reflecting on their art, they have noted that "part of what I wanted to do was bring the culture into the queer spaces and in a way kinda shove it down everybody’s throat…you can’t walk down church street and hear Duduk sounds blasting from a club like it's just not gonna happen…but that’s the vision that I have when I walk down [Toronto’s LGBTQ] village.”

== Filmography ==
=== Television ===
Year	Title	Role	Notes	Ref.
2025	Drag Brunch Saved My Life	Herself	Season 1, Episode 7 ("The Alpine, Toronto ON")	

== Personal life ==
Anoush Ellah uses the pronouns he/they out of drag and she/her in drag.
