= Equality Armenia =

US-based non-governmental organization

- Հավասարություն Հայաստան
- Abbreviation: EqAr
- Founded: 2017; 9 years ago
- Type: Nonprofit
- Legal status: Non-governmental organization
- Purpose: Marriage equality, LGBT rights in Armenia, LGBT activism
- Headquarters: Los Angeles
- Locations: Los Angeles, United States; Yerevan, Armenia
- Region served: Armenia
- Methods: Advocacy
- Director: Armen Abelyan
- Website: Equality Armenia

Equality Armenia (EqAr) (Armenian: Հավասարություն Հայաստան, romanized: Havasarut’yun Hayastan) is a non-governmental organization which advocates for marriage equality in Armenia. Equality Armenia was founded in 2017 and is headquartered in Los Angeles, California.

== History ==
Equality Armenia was founded on 2 December 2017 and its current Director is Armen Abelyan. The organization seeks to achieve marriage equality in Armenia, as well as, advancing both LGBT rights and human rights, and combating homophobia in the country. During an interview on 28 November 2017, EqAr Director Abelyan stated, "Marriage equality is within reach in Armenia and that concerted effort in the Diaspora is crucial."

On 28 February 2018, Equality Armenia hosted a charity event in Pasadena to raise funds for Pink Armenia, an organization based in Armenia focusing on the advancement of LGBT rights.

On 29 March 2019, Equality Armenia held its first annual Leadership Council in Glendale. The forum brought together lgbtq activists, government officials, and community leaders to discuss advancing LGBTQ equality in Armenia. Various Los Angeles Councilmembers, Glendale Mayor Vartan Gharpetian, delegates from the Armenian National Committee of America, GALAS LGBTQ+ Armenian Society, and Equality California spoke at the event. EqAr Director Abelyan stated, "The future of the LGBTQ community is woven with the future of Armenia. It always has been. Armenia has a window of opportunity to become a leader in the region."

== Partnerships ==
Equality Armenia has developed partnerships with other LGBT rights organizations including Pink Armenia and Right Side NGO.

== See also ==
- Human rights in Armenia
- LGBT rights in Armenia
- List of LGBT rights organizations in the United States
- List of LGBT rights organisations
- Recognition of same-sex unions in Armenia
- Social issues in Armenia
