= Rosslyn Park =

Rosslyn Park may refer to:

- Rosslyn Park, South Australia, a suburb of Adelaide
- Rosslyn Park F.C., a rugby union team in England
