= Abdul Afiq Roslan =

Bruneian footballer

Afiq Roslan
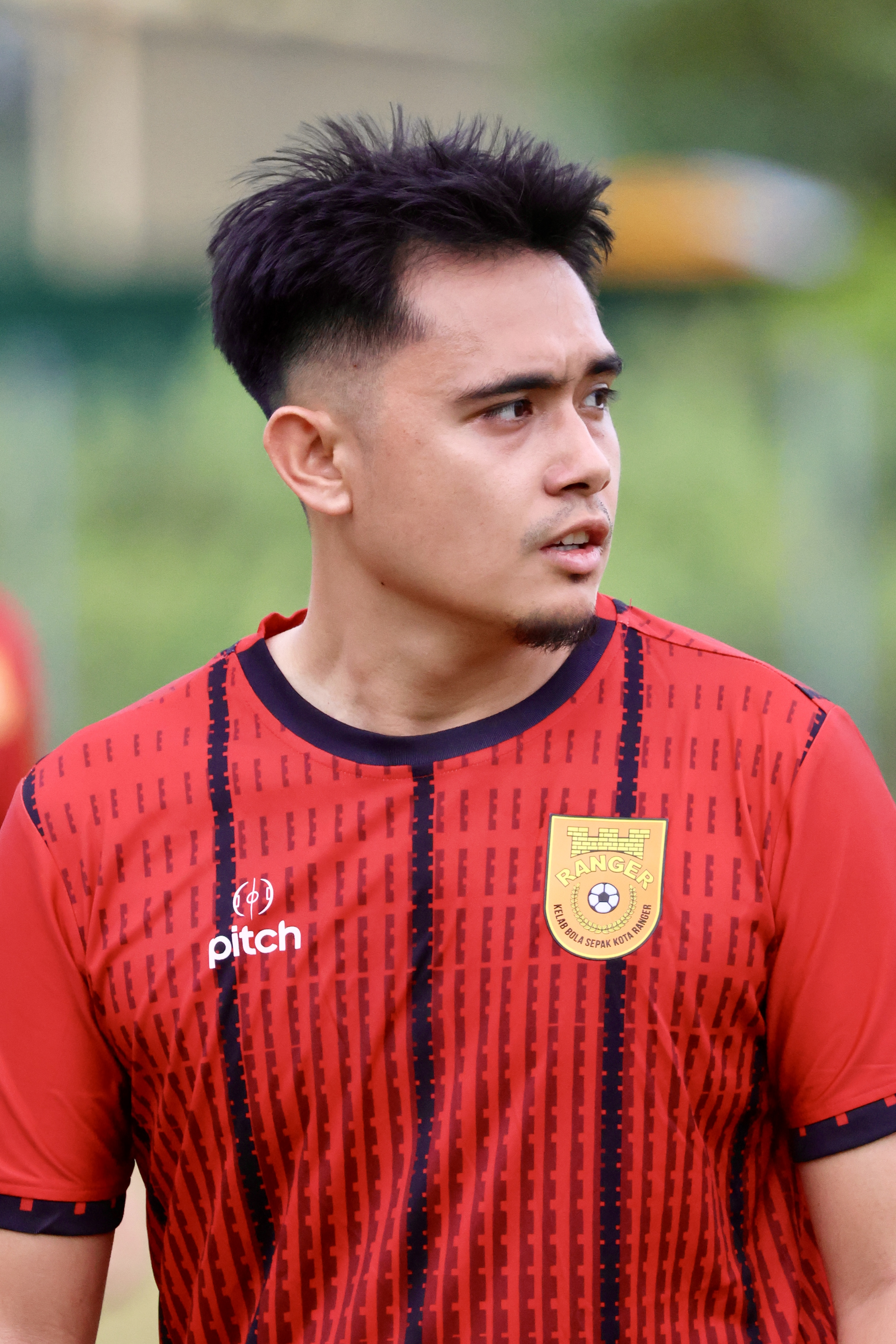
- Afiq in 2024

Personal information
- Full name: Abdul Afiq bin Roslan
- Date of birth: 20 January 1996 (age 30)
- Place of birth: Brunei
- Position: Midfielder

Team information
- Current team: Panchor Murai FC
- Number: 21

Youth career
- 2015: DPMM U19

Senior career*
| Years | Team | Apps | (Gls) |
| 2014–2015 | Najip I-Team | | (3) |
| 2016 | Tabuan U21 | | (1) |
| 2017 | DPMM | 0 | (0) |
| 2017–2018 | Najip I-Team | | (1) |
| 2019 | Indera | | (2) |
| 2021–2026 | Kota Ranger | | (0) |
| 2026– | Panchor Murai | 5 | (3) |

International career^{‡}
| 2013–2014 | Brunei U19 | 2 | (0) |
- * Club domestic league appearances and goals as of 8 November 2026 ‡ National team caps and goals as of 7 March 2017

Abdul Afiq bin Roslan (born 20 January 1996) is a Bruneian footballer who plays as a midfielder for Panchor Murai FC. He has also appeared for the Brunei under-19 team.

== Club career ==
Afiq began his club career in 2014 with Najip FC (renamed as Najip I-Team in 2015) of the Brunei Super League as one of several youth internationals recruited by Johari Bungsu for a squad overhaul, in place of a team that lost every game in the previous season. He appeared regularly for Najip I-Team in the following season, scoring three league goals to help his club to consecutive third-place finishes. He was selected by NFABD to play for Tabuan U21 in the 2016 season.

Afiq trialled for and joined Brunei's sole professional club DPMM FC's youth team in early 2015. He signed full terms on 15 January 2017, taking the number 17 shirt vacated by Na'im Tarif. He was released from the first team in June during the mid-season transfer window, to allocate for Brunei international Hazwan Hamzah. He rejoined Najip I-Team since, and scored against Lun Bawang FC on 13 August.

Afiq signed for Indera SC in early 2019 and scored a brace on his debut against Setia Perdana on 15 February. He left the club at the end of the season.

Afiq joined Kota Ranger FC in the 2021 Brunei Super League season, and stayed at the club until the 2026–27 Brunei Super League season when they ceased their participation in the league.

== International career ==
Afiq was selected to play for the Brunei Under-19s at the 2013 AFF U-19 Youth Championship held in Indonesia in September, appearing once against Malaysia in a 5–0 loss. The following month Afiq travelled to Thailand for the 2014 AFC U-19 Championship qualifying matches and played once against North Korea in a 0–6 defeat.
