= Roslin Art Gallery =

Coordinates: 34.150033°N 118.255613°W

The Roslin Art Gallery was an art gallery located in Glendale, California, that was dedicated to preserving Armenian folk art.

== History ==
The Roslin Art Gallery was named after Toros Roslin, the most prominent master of the Armenian illuminated manuscripts in the Middle Ages. The gallery aspired to promote and introduce Armenian art, both historical and contemporary. The gallery was founded in 1998. In 2020, the gallery closed when it and the adjoining Abril Books were unable to stay due to an increase in real estate rental costs.

== See also ==
- Armenian art
