= Allyship =

English-language neologism used in social justice activism

Allyship is an English-language neologism used in contemporary social justice activism to describe efforts by groups of people to advance the interests of marginalized groups both in society at large and in particular social contexts, for example universities or workplaces. The term and related behaviors are controversial, with critics alleging that allyship is an ideological, performative, and insincere notion that may ignore prior concepts of tolerance and solidarity.

The term entered widespread use during the 2010s and the presidency of Donald Trump. Its usage has become especially common in political activism and organizational rhetoric since the murder of George Floyd and the beginning of the international George Floyd protests in May 2020; in 2021, it was announced as Dictionary.com's "Word of the Year".

Proponents of the concept say that allyship can be a response to most forms of discrimination, such as racism, ableism, xenophobia, and sexism (see intersectionality). Outcomes of allyship that are considered desirable by its advocates include greater inclusion in the workplace and empowerment of outgroups. Some advocates of allyship may define it in routes of activism, such as changing to more inclusive use of language, removing bias from hiring and promotion processes, and combating perceived forms of prejudice against disadvantaged groups. Other proponents of the term describe it as a "lifelong process" that cannot be limited to individual behaviors or patterns of behavior; while some Black workers have reported that performative and excessive demonstrations of allyship have negatively impacted their quality of life and comfort within their workplaces. To produce genuine allyship, some proponents consider impromptu speaking as a key skill to operate on authenticity in everyday words and reactions.

== Background ==
While the noun "allyship" has appeared in English-language sources since the 1840s, its present meaning has come into use since the 1970s. The term likely derives from the concept of a straight ally (also see gay straight alliance), who were straight supporters of the LGBT rights movement and LGBT people at a time when there were legal and social barriers to LGBT persons' participation in society. Additional research, however, has attested to a similar usage as far back as 1943, when it was used in a racial justice context. It was first entered into the Oxford English Dictionary in March 2021.

Academic supporters of the term have theorized the "praxis" of allyship by distinct groups of privileged individuals; many scholars have proposed specific forms of praxis among librarians, museum educators, social justice workers, social media users, university faculty, and other professionals. The concept of praxis itself is controversial, especially due to its association with the work of Karl Marx and Jean-Paul Sartre (see praxis); prominent critics of its use include cultural critic and former academic James Lindsay, who likens its prominence in social justice activism to a "religious duty".

== Criticism ==
While the term allyship finds common usage in the language and rhetoric of some social justice activists, as well as diversity, equity, and inclusion initiatives, it has not found widespread acceptance or usage outside of parts of the English-speaking world. This lack of acceptance has resulted from the broader controversy surrounding the rhetoric and tactics of 21st-century social justice activism, as well as more specifically, the unclear and artificially-constructed difference in meaning between allyship and the far more common term alliance, which has clear cognates in other languages (e.g., the Spanish "alianza").

Like other prominent concepts in contemporary social justice movements, the concept of allyship and many associated behaviors have faced sustained opposition from most scholars and commentators holding conservative and classical liberal views. These opponents usually state that identity-based rhetoric is divisive and retributive, and without regard for individuals' character or the race-neutral notion of friendship. Because of its emphasis on intersectionality, the concept of allyship has become associated with the controversy surrounding critical race theory in the United States. According to recent polls, U.S. public opinion towards critical race theory and associated social justice movements is largely negative and declining.

Criticism of the term may also be found among supporters of the broader social justice and Black Lives Matter movements. Some critics say that the practices and behaviors associated with allyship do not reflect sincere intentions and serve primarily to validate their practitioners. Similarly, Emma Dabiri has said that "Allyship offers charity whereas coalition is more about solidarity", and that allyship's emphasis on the efforts of a privileged group to help disadvantaged groups reflects a "paternalistic attitude". Other concerns have stemmed from the degree to which the rhetoric of allyship is perceived as performative or insincere.

Allyship that is performative can emerge in numerous ways. That being said, performative allyship is understood to derive from reward, typically in the form of social recognition. A performative ally expresses support for marginalized groups or individuals, however, the intention behind the support works to uphold their own self image.

Some other critics, like David Weitzner, have also argued that the approach of allyship ignores the principles of organic and culturally-particular forms of cooperation and toleration, such as the Jewish concept of chavrusa, a form of instruction that empowers student participation.

== See also ==
- Straight ally
- Anti-racism
- Anti-bias curriculum
