= Armen (name) =

Armen (Armenian: Արմեն) is an Armenian given name and surname.

Notable people with the name include:

== Given name ==
- Armen Abaghian (1933–2008), Armenian Russian nuclear scientist
- Armen Adamjan (born 1989), American influencer
- Armen Adamyan (born 1967), Armenian footballer and coach
- Armen Agop (born 1969), Egyptian artist of Armenian origin
- Armen Akopyan (born 1980), Ukrainian midfielder
- Armen Alchian (1914–2013), American economist
- Armen Ambartsumyan (footballer, born 1978) (born 1978), Bulgarian-Armenian football goalkeeper
- Armen Ambartsumyan (born 1994), Armenian/Russian footballer
- Armen Arslanian (1960–2015), Lebanese cyclist
- Armen Ashotyan (born 1975), Armenian politician
- Armen Avanessian (born 1973), Austrian philosopher, literary theorist, and political theorist
- Armen Ayvazyan (born 1964), Armenian historian and political scientist
- Armen Babakhanian (born 1967), Armenian classical pianist
- Armen Babalaryan (born 1971), Armenian football midfielder
- Armen Bagdasarov (born 1972), Uzbek judoka
- Armen Boladian, Armenian-American record producer
- Armen Chakmakian (born 1966), Armenian-American musician
- Armen Darbinyan (born 1964), Prime Minister of Armenia
- Armen Davoudian, American poet and translator
- Armen Der Kiureghian (born 1947), Armenian academic and professor
- Armen Donelian (born 1950), Armenian jazz pianist
- Armen Dorian (1892–1915), Ottoman Armenian teacher, poet and editor
- Armen Dzhigarkhanyan (1935–2020), Armenian actor working in Russia
- Armen Elbakyan (born 1954), Armenian actor, producer and director
- Armen Garo (1872–1923), Armenian freedom fighter and politician in Ottoman Turkey, Russian Empire and the First Republic of Armenia
- Armen Gevorgyan (born 1973), Armenian politician
- Armen Gevorkyan, Armenian boxer
- Armen Ghazaryan (born 1982), Armenian weightlifter
- Armen Gilliam (1964–2011), American professional basketball player
- Armen Grigoryan (guitarist) (born 1960), Russian singer, songwriter and artist
- Armen Grigoryan (born 1971), Armenian folk musician
- Armen Grigoryan (born 1983), Armenian politician and political scientist
- Armen Gyulbudaghyants (born 1966), Armenian footballer and manager
- Armen Hakhnazarian (1941–2009), Armenian architect
- Armen Hambardzumyan (born 1958), Armenian actor and producer
- Armen Harutyunyan (born 1964), Armenian lawyer and civil servant
- Armen A. Harutyunyan (born 1981), Armenian politician and economist
- Armen Hovhannisyan (1994–2014), Armenian soldier
- Armen Hovhannisyan (born 2000), Armenian footballer
- Armen Kazaryan (born 1963), Armenian art historian
- Armen Keteyian (born 1953), American television journalist
- Armen V. Kevorkian, Armenian-American VFX artist and TV director
- Armen Kirakossian (1960–2025), Armenian politician
- Armen Kocharian (born 1948), Iranian Armenian physician and cardiologist
- Armen Kouptsios (1885–1906), Macedonian Greek revolutionary
- Armen Manucharyan (born 1995), Armenian footballer
- Armen Margarian (born 1978), Armenian American businessman
- Armen Margaryan (born 1971), Armenian actor
- Armen T. Marsoobian, American historian and academic
- Armen Martirosyan (disambiguation), multiple people
- Armen Mazmanyan (1960–2014), Armenian theatre director and actor
- Armen Melikyan (born 1996), Armenian wrestler
- Armen Melkonian (born 1958), Armenian diplomat
- Armen Mkoyan (born 1961), Armenian businessman
- Armen Mkrtchyan (born 1973), Armenian wrestler
- Armen Movsessian (born 1969), Armenian violinist
- Armen Movsisyan (1962–2015), Armenian politician
- Armen Nalbandian (born 1978), Armenian jazz pianist
- Armen Nazaryan (born 1974), Armenian/Bulgarian Greco Roman wrestler
- Armen Nazaryan (born 1982), Armenian judoka
- Armen Oganesyan (born 1954), Russian radio host
- Armen Ohanian (1887–1976), Armenian actress, dancer, translator and writer
- Armen Orujyan (born 1974), Armenian-American entrepreneur
- Armen Petikyan (born 1972), Armenian footballer
- Armen Petrosyan (born 1975), Armenian actor, producer and broadcaster
- Armen Petrosyan (born 1986), Armenian-Italian kickboxer
- Armen Petrosyan (born 1990), Armenian and Russian MMA fighter
- Armen Poghosyan (born 1965), Armenian military musician
- Armen Poghosyan (conductor) (born 1974), Armenian Russian orchestra conductor
- Armen Ra (born 1969), American theremin player
- Armen Rafayelyan (born 1978), Armenian freestyle skier
- Armen Sanamyan (born 1966), Armenian footballer and coach
- Armen Sargsyan (died 2025), Russian-Armenian gangster, businessman and separatist
- Armen Sarkissian (born 1952), Armenian politician, physicist, investor, businessman and computer scientist
- Armen Sarvazyan (born 1939), Armenian American biophysicist and entrepreneur
- Armen Shahgeldyan (born 1973), Armenian footballer and manager
- Armen Shekoyan (1953–2021), Armenian writer, journalist and poet
- Armen Smbatian (born 1954), Armenian diplomat
- Armen Stepanyan (born 1974), Russian footballer and manager
- Armen Takhtajan (1910–2009), Soviet-Armenian botanist
- Armen Terzian (1915–1989), American football official in the National Football League
- Armen Tigranian (1879–1950), Armenian composer, conductor and activist
- Armen Tigranyan (born 1985), Armenian football midfielder
- Armen Trchounian (1956–2020), Armenian biophysicist
- Armen Vardanyan (born 1982), Ukrainian wrestler of Armenian origin
- Armen Vardapetyan (born 1980), Armenian jeweler, sculptor and artist
- Armen Weitzman (born 1983), American actor and comedian of Armenian origin
- Armen Yeghiazaryan (born 1980), Armenian politician
- Armen Zakaryan, Russian boxer

== Surname ==
- Kay Armen (1915–2011), Armenian American singer
- Margaret Armen (1921–2003), American screenwriter and author
- Mkrtich Armen (1906–1972), Soviet Armenian writer and poet
- Robert Armen (born 1947), a special trial judge of the United States Tax Court
- Rosy Armen (born 1939), Armenian-French singer
- Garo H. Armen (born 1953), American businessman who co-founded Antigenics
