= Martirosyan =

Martirosyan (Armenian: Մարտիրոսյան) or variants Mardirosian and Mardirossian in Western Armenian and at times Martirosjan is an Armenian surname. It means "son of Martiros" (a martyr in Armenian).

Notable people with the surname include:

== Martirosyan ==
- Amasi Martirosyan (1897–1971), Armenian film director
- Armen Martirosyan, multiple people
- Armenouhi Martirosyan (born 1961), Armenian artist
- Garik Martirosyan (born 1974), Armenian humorist
- Gennady Martirosyan (born 1980), Russian-based Armenian boxer
- Georgy Martirosyan, multiple people
- Gevorg Martirosyan (born 1983), Armenian singer and actor
- Grigory Martirosyan (born 1978), Armenian politician
- Haik M. Martirosyan (born 2000), Armenian chess player
- Hrach Martirosyan (born 1964), Armenian linguist
- Levon Martirosyan (born 1976), Armenian politician
- Lilit Martirosyan, Armenian LGBTQ+ rights activist
- Natalia Martirosyan (1889–1960), Armenian engineer
- Nikolay Martirosyan (born 1982), Armenian-American neurosurgeon
- Pargev Martirosyan (born 1954), Armenian clergyman
- Razmik Martirosyan (born 1959), Armenian politician
- Sarkis Martirosyan (1900–1984), Soviet–Armenian general-lieutenant
- Simon Martirosyan (born 1997), Armenian weightlifter
- Tigran Martirosyan, multiple people
- Vahram Martirosyan (born 1959), Armenian writer, screenwriter and journalist
- Vanes Martirosyan (1986–2025), Armenian-American professional boxer
- Vika Martirosyan (born 1985), Armenian choreographer and dancer

== Martirosian ==
- Arsen Martirosian (born 1977), Armenian super bantamweight boxer
- Balabek Martirosian (1905–1972), Armenian party and state worker
- Flora Martirosian (1957–2012), Armenian folk singer
- Gabrielė Martirosian (born 1991), Lithuanian model, actress and radio and television presenter
- Georgi Martirosian (1895–1938), Soviet local historian

== Martirosjan ==
- Sargis Martirosjan (born 1986), Austrian weightlifter

== Mardirosian ==
- Haig Mardirosian (born 1947), college dean, concert organist, composer, and conductor
- Tom Mardirosian (born 1947), American Armenian actor

== Mardirossian ==
- Garo Mardirossian, Armenian-American attorney
- Kevork Mardirossian (1954–2024), American violinist
- Margaret Mardirossian, Canadian Armenian film producer, founder of Anaid Productions
- Vahan Mardirossian (born 1975), Armenian pianist and conductor

== See also ==
- Armen Martirosyan (disambiguation)
- Tigran Martirosyan (disambiguation)
