= Ambartsumian =

Ambartsumian, Ambartsumyan, Hambardzumyan, Hambardzumian, Hambartsumyan or Hambartsumian (Armenian: Համբարձումյան) is an Armenian surname. In Armenian onomastics, it is a religious surname derived from 'Hambardzum' meaning Ascension of Jesus. The suffix '-yan' denotes surname (all Armenian surnames end in -ian or -yan with a few exceptions). The variants beginning without H (Ambartsoumian, Ambartsumian, Ambartsumyan, etc.) originated in the USSR as Russian lacks the sound H. Notable people with this last name include :

- Armen Ambartsumyan, multiple people
- Armen Hambardzumyan (born 1958), Armenian actor and producer
- Arsen Hambardzumyan (born 1973), Armenian politician
- David Hambartsumyan (1956–1992), Armenian diver
- Eduard Hambardzumyan (born 1986), Armenian boxer
- Hovhannes Hambardzumyan (born 1990), Armenian footballer
- Levon Ambartsumian (born 1955), Armenian violinist and conductor
- Ofelya Hambardzumyan (1925–2016), Armenian folk singer
- Sargis Hambardzumyan, Soviet Armenian politician and professional revolutionary of the Bolshevik Party
- Sergey Ambartsumian (1922–2018), Soviet and Armenian scientist
- Sergo Hambardzumyan (1910–1983), Armenian weightlifter
- Viktor Ambartsumian (1908–1996), Soviet Armenian astronomer and astrophysicist
- Vyacheslav Ambartsumyan (1940–2008), Soviet international footballer
