= Armen Grigoryan =

Armen Grigoryan may refer to:

- Armen Grigoryan (guitarist) (born 1960), front man and main songwriter of Russian rock-band Krematorij
- Armen Grigoryan (duduk player) (born 1971), Armenian musician
- Armen Grigoryan (politician) (born 1983), Armenian politician and political scientist
