= Tatsu (disambiguation) =

Tatsu is a roller coaster at the Six Flags Magic Mountain amusement park in Valencia, California, United States.

Tatsu may also refer to:

== People with the name ==
- Tatsu Aoki (born 1957), Japanese bass player and record producer
- Tatsu Hirota (1904–1990), Japanese painter
- Tatsu Yamashita (born 1953), Japanese singer-songwriter and record producer
- Tatsu Ishimoda (1924–2022), Japanese politician
- Tatsu Tanaka (1892–1985), Japanese midwife and politician
- Yoshi Tatsu (born 1977), Japanese wrestler

=== Characters ===
- Tatsu, a minor supporting character in the Teenage Mutant Ninja Turtles franchise
- Tatsu Yamashiro, the real name of DC Comics superheroine Katana
- Tatsu, the main character of the manga series The Way of the Househusband
- Tatsu Hattori, a minor supporting character in the fifth and final season of Teenage Mutant Ninja Turtles

== Other uses ==
- Tatsu, a word for Japanese dragon
- Tatsu (film), a 1994 Russian film
