= Sergey Golovkin =

Executed Russian serial killer, rapist, and necrophile (1959–1996)

- Born: Sergey Aleksandrovich Golovkin; 26 November 1959; Moscow, Soviet Union
- Died: 2 August 1996 (aged 36); Butyrka Prison, Moscow, Russia
- Other names: The Fisher; The Boa; Chikatilo's Apprentice
- Status: Executed
- Conviction: Murder with aggravating circumstances (11 counts)
- Penalty: Death

Details
- Victims: 11–13+
- Span of crimes: 1986–1992
- Country: Soviet Union, Russia
- State: Moscow
- Date apprehended: 19 October 1992

Sergey Aleksandrovich Golovkin (Russian: Серге́й Александрович Головкин; 26 November 1959 – 2 August 1996) was a Soviet-Russian serial killer, rapist and necrophile, convicted for the killing of 11 boys between the ages of 10 and 16 in the Moscow area between 1986 and 1992. Golovkin, also known as Fisher and The Boa, tortured, raped and killed young boys in his garage basement and the forests outside Moscow.

Golovkin was the last person to be executed in Russia before the moratorium on capital punishment.

== Background ==
Sergey Aleksandrovich Golovkin was born on 26 November 1959, in Moscow, Soviet Union. His father was an alcoholic, and his parents divorced in 1988. Golovkin was born with a birth defect in his sternum. He often had bronchitis and indigestion. In school, Golovkin was considered a loner, and his male classmates noted how he had no interest in girls. He was known to have enuresis, and was afraid that his classmates would smell his urine. Golovkin was a classmate of Armen Grigoryan, the future front-man of Krematorij. When Golovkin was 13 years old, he began to exhibit sadistic tendencies, including catching a cat in the street and bringing it home, where he hung it and then decapitated it. He also boiled aquarium fish alive in a pot.

In 1982, Golovkin graduated from the Timiryazev Agricultural Academy. He began working at a racetrack, then as a livestock expert at a stud farm in Moscow. For his achievements in horse breeding development, Golovkin was awarded a silver medal at a VDNKh trade show in 1989.

In 1984, Golovkin committed his first known crime, when he attempted to rape and murder a young boy.

== Murders ==
=== Moscow Oblast killings ===
In April 1986, Golovkin committed his first murder, near the Katuar railway station in Nekrasov, Moscow Oblast, just outside of Moscow. He met 15-year-old Andrey Pavlov, threatened him with a knife and dragged him into the forest. Pavlov was raped and strangled to death and Golovkin performed necrophilia on the body.

The following July, Golovkin committed his second murder, abducting 12-year-old Andrey Gulyaev from a summer camp near Odintsovo, Moscow Oblast. Gulyaev was also threatened with a knife, taken to the forest, then raped and strangled before Golovkin dismembered the body.

Four days later, after Gulyaev's murder, the dead body of a 16-year-old was found in Odintsovsky District. A total of 35 stab wounds were found on the body. The corpse was dismembered. Later, Golovkin denied any guilt in this murder.

=== Garage murders ===
In 1988, Golovkin purchased a beige-coloured VAZ-2103 car, which he stored in his garage where he began constructing a basement, originally to be used as a workshop; however, he realized it could be used as a dungeon to commit his sexual crimes. From August 1990 on, Golovkin killed eight boys aged 10 to 16 years old, on two occasions torturing two at the same time. In September 1992, Golovkin raped and killed three boys he had lured into his garage, offering to commit theft from a warehouse. The last of them Golovkin tortured and raped for 12 hours and then hung up before he went to work.

== Arrest and conviction ==
On 5 October 1992, three weeks after the last murders, the bodies of the final three victims were found by mushroom pickers. On 19 October 1992, Golovkin was detained under suspicion by the police. During the interrogation, he behaved calmly and denied guilt. Investigators Kostaryov and Bakin decided to release Golovkin, instead setting up secret surveillance on him; however, a policeman violated the order and put Golovkin in solitary confinement for the night. In the morning, Golovkin was questioned, and he confessed to the last three murders to Kostaryov. The next day, police searched Golovkin's garage, discovering a baby bath with a burnt layer of skin and blood, clothes, and body parts. Golovkin then confessed to a total of 11 murders, revealing where he had disposed of the bodies of his victims.

Golovkin was found to be sane, but with schizoid disorder and psychopathy, and on 19 October 1994, Golovkin was sentenced to death.

On 2 August 1996, Golovkin was executed at Butyrka Prison by a single shot to the back of the head. He was the last person to be executed by Russia before a moratorium on capital punishment was issued by President Boris Yeltsin.

Lawyer Yuri Antonyan mentioned Golovkin in his notes regarding Nikolai Dzhumagaliev:

Sexual "serial" murders have common characteristics that are always associated with the intimate life of the perpetrator, his psycho-traumatic sexual experiences, his feelings of sexual inadequacy and inferiority, which allows one to call such murders sexual. In the life of each, such killers had serious failures in sexuality, and the overwhelming majority did not feel like men. So, Chikatilo was impotent, Golovkin (who killed 12 boys and teenagers) and Ershov (who killed 4 women with an axe) were virgins, and cannibal killer Dzhumagaliev was disgusted by sexual intercourse, etc. In a word, almost all serial sex killers were sexually incompetent or felt they were.

== Victims ==
List of Golovkin's victims:

- 19 April 1986: Andrey Pavlov (16)
- 10 July 1986: Andrey Gulyaev (14)
- 23 September 1989: Sergey Strochkin (10)
- 11 August 1990: Sergey Zakharenkov (15)
- 6 November 1990: Alexey Buryakov (11)
- 6 November 1990: Roman Dergachyov (14)
- 22 August 1991: Nikita Bogdanov (13)
- 21–22 April 1992: Sergey Plyukhin (14)
- 15 September 1992: Yuri Sidyakin (12)
- 15 September 1992: Vladislav Sharikov (13)
- 15 September 1992: Denis Efremov (12)

== See also ==
- List of Russian serial killers
- List of serial killers by number of victims
