= Hambardzum =

Hambardzum (Armenian: Համբարձում), also spelt Hambartsum and Ambartsum, is an Armenian masculine given name, meaning "ascension". Notable people with the given name include:

- Hambardzum Arakelian (1865–1918), Armenian journalist, writer and public activist
- Hampartzoum Berberian (1905–1999), Armenian American composer, conductor and political activist
- Hampartsoum Boyadjian (1860–1915), Armenian fedayee and politician in the Ottoman Empire
- Hambardzum Galstyan (1955–1994), Armenian politician and historian
- Hambarsoom Grigorian (1893–1975), Armenian musician
- Hampar Kelikian (1899–1983), Armenian American orthopedic surgeon
- Hambartsum Khachanyan (1894–1944), Armenian actor
- Hampartsoum Limondjian (1768–1839), Ottoman Armenian composer
- Hambardzum Terteryan (1884–????), Armenian politician

== See also ==
- Ambartsumian, a surname derived from this name
