= Georgy Martirosyan =

Georgy Martirosyan may refer to:

- Georgy Martirosyan (actor)
- Georgy Martirosyan (serial killer)
