= How to Find the Ideal =

- Directed by: Vera Yakovenko
- Written by: Vera Yakovenko and others
- Produced by: Sergei Selyanov
- Starring: Zamira Kolkhieva; Armen Grigoryan
- Distributed by: Panopticum, Avrora Prod
- Release date: 2007
- Running time: 90 minutes
- Countries: Russia, Ukraine
- Language: Russian

How to Find the Ideal (Russian: «Как найти идеал», romanized: Kak nayti ideal) is a 2007 Russian-Ukrainian comedy directed by Vera Yakovenko and starring Armen Grigoryan.

== Plot ==
A young romantic girl Masha works in a bank. She is divorced, and is interested in a new relation. She met three men: one is a TV showman, the second is a famous musician, and the third is a scandally-known politician...

== Cast ==
- Zamira Kolkhieva
- Evgeny Sidikhin
- Armen Grigoryan
- Vitaly Yegorov
- Ostap Stupka
- Natalya Lukeyicheva
- Svetlana Orlichenko
- Stanislav Boklan
- Galina Davydova
- George Drozd
- Nina Nizheradze
- Vitaly Ivanchenko
- Kristina Khizhnyak
- Yaroslav Mysiv
- Ivan Dorn
- Konstantin Isayev (II)
- Julia Ananyeva
- Vitaly Salii
