= Nikolay Korshunov =

Russian journalist (born 1978)

Nikolay Korshunov (Russian Никола́й Борúсович Кóршунов; born 23 April 1978, Moscow) — is a Russian musician and journalist, especially known as a member of Krematorij rock-band since 2008.

He studied at Moscow Musical School after Dunaevsky and Moscow State University. PhD in Philosophy (2003). Since 2005 he plays bass in "Arteria" and "Butterfly Temple" bands, collaborated with Valery Kipelov, Arthur Berkut, Paul Di'Anno and Blaze Bayley.

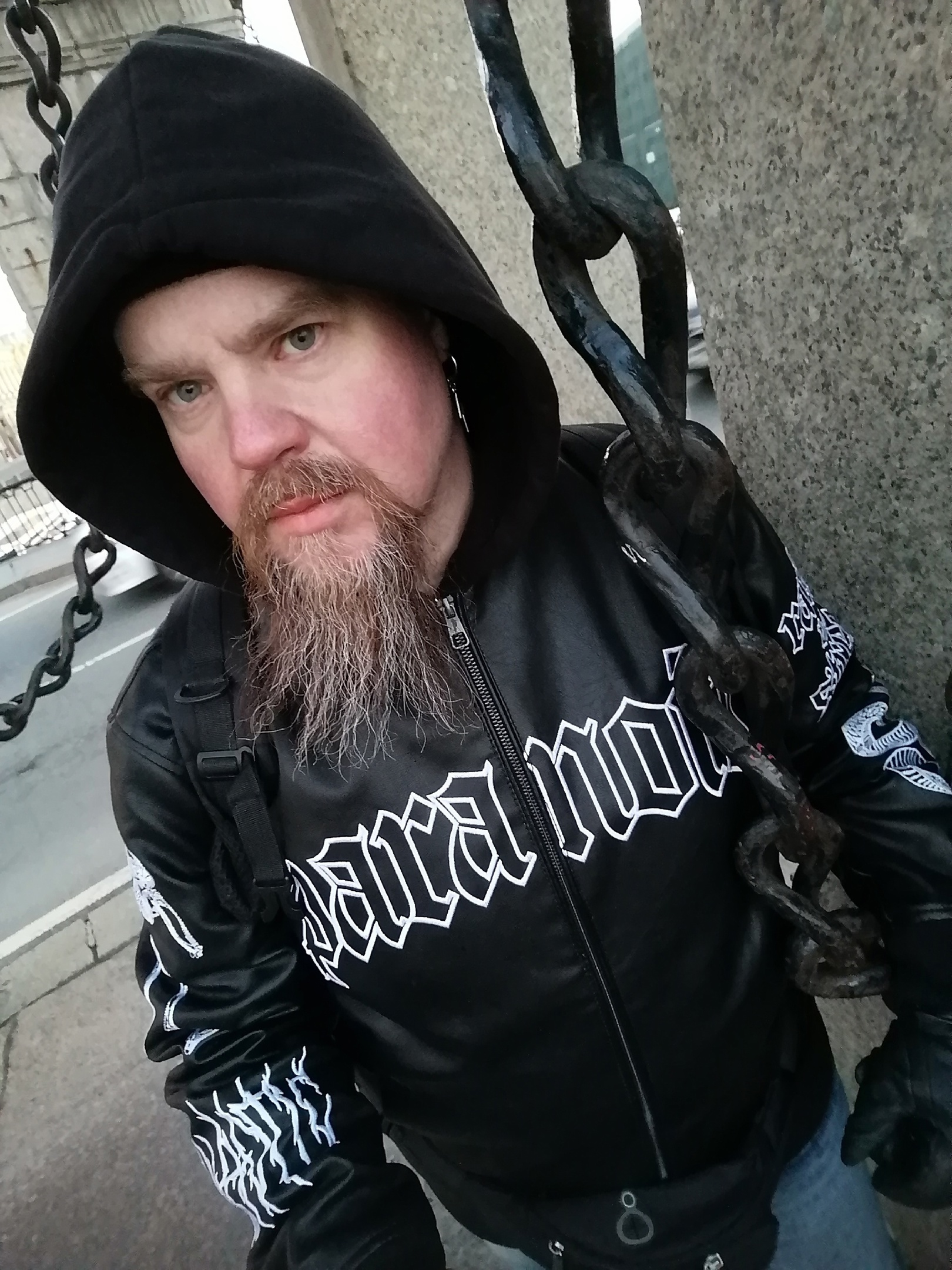

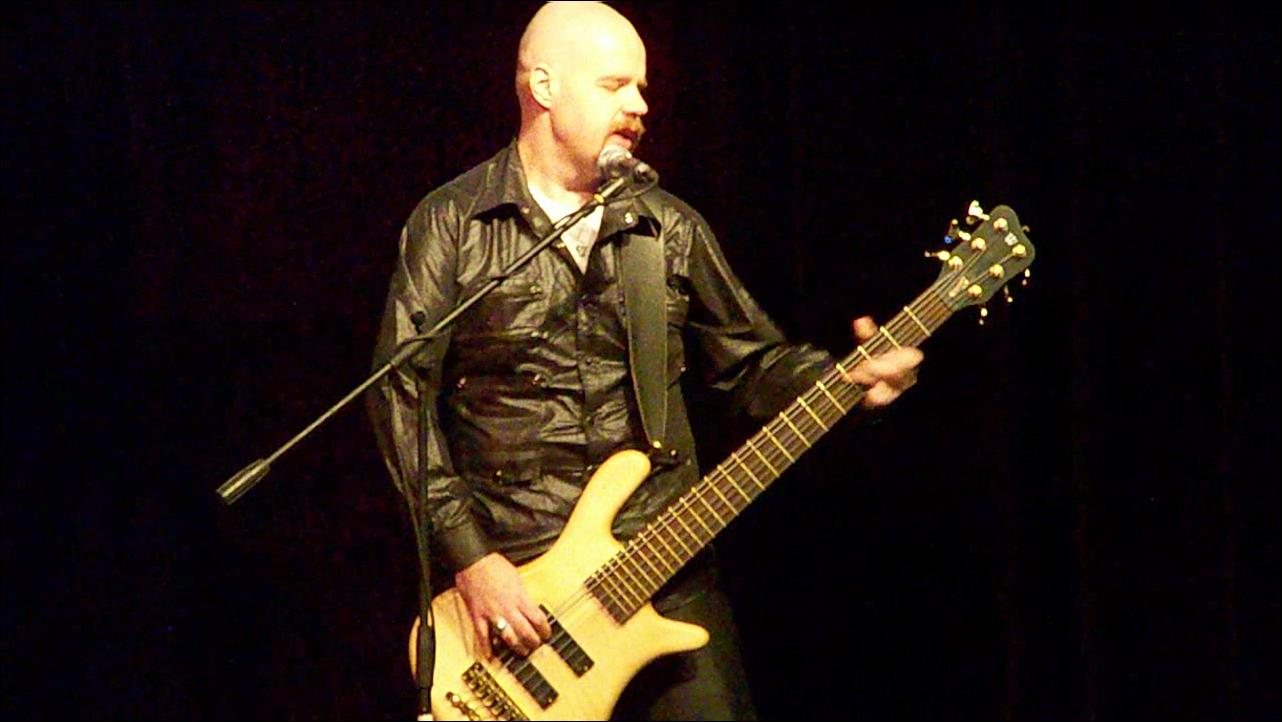
2009
