= Tigran Martirosyan =

Tigran Martirosyan may refer to:

- Tigran Gevorg Martirosyan (born 1988), Armenian weightlifter who competes in the 69kg and 77kg category
- Tigran Vardan Martirosyan (born 1983), Armenian weightlifter who competes in the 85kg category
- Tigran Martirosyan (tennis) (born 1983), Armenian tennis player
