= Armen Davoudian =

Armenian poet

Armen Davoudian is a Berkeley, California-based poet. He has translated works from Persian into English, including Fatemeh Shams's Hopscotch (2024).

== Biography ==
=== Early life ===
Davoudian grew up in New Julfa, the Armenian neighborhood of Isfahan, Iran, where he lived for 17 years before later emigrating to the United States. He earned his Bachelor of Arts from UC Berkeley in 2013 and his Master of Fine Arts from Johns Hopkins University in 2019. As of 2024, he is an English PhD candidate at Stanford University.

=== Career ===
In 2024, Davoudian's debut book, a collection of poetry named The Palace of Forty Pillars, was published. The book weaves family and Armenian history with James Merrill, Rainer Maria Rilke, and Persian works such as the Shahnameh.

At a February 2025 poetry reading at Hammer Museum, Davoudian stated that poetry is "less, maybe for me at least, about finding what something meant, and more about what it meant to me or to whoever the writer is."

In April 2025, Davoudian joined International Armenian Literary Alliance as an advisory boardmember.

Davoudian is currently completing a Doctor of Philosophy in English at Stanford University.

=== Personal life ===
Davoudian is part of the LGBTQ+ community.
