= Tatsu (film) =

Tatsu / Hound Dogs
- Directed by: Vyacheslav Lagunov
- Written by: Vyacheslav Lagunov
- Produced by: Vladimir Lavrenko
- Starring: Margarita Pushkina; Nastia Poleva; Krematorij
- Release date: 1994
- Country: Russia
- Language: Russian

Tatsu (Russian: Тацу) (alternative title: Hound Dogs (Russian: Гончие псы)) is a 1994 Russian film directed by Vera Yakovenko and starring Margarita Pushkina, Nastia Poleva, Krematorij, Molotov Cocktail bands and others.

== Plot ==
According to film director Lagunov, "Tatsu is a dragon that sits inside everyone of us. It chokes those of us who yielded to our temptations.". The film is a story of a Soviet hippy who was imprisoned for 5 years and tries to fit in after the release.
