= Armen Kirakossian =

Armenian politician (1960–2025)

- Արմեն Կիրակոսյան

Member of the National Assembly of Armenia
- In office 27 July 1995 – 9 June 1999

Personal details
- Born: Armen Arami Kirakossian; 28 March 1960; Yerevan, Armenian SSR, USSR
- Died: 5 February 2025 (aged 64)
- Political party: Pan-Armenian National Movement
- Education: Karl Marx Institute of Polytechnic
- Occupation: Engineer

Armen Arami Kirakossian (Armenian: Արմեն Արամի Կիրակոսյան; 28 March 1960 – 5 February 2025) was an Armenian politician. A member of the Pan-Armenian National Movement, he served in the National Assembly from 1995 to 1999.

Kirakossian died on 5 February 2025, at the age of 64.
