= Armen Kocharian =

Iranian Armenian cardiologist

Armen Masihi Kocharian
- Born: 1948 (age 77–78); Tehran, Iran
- Occupation: Cardiology/University Professor

Armen Masihi Kocharian (Armenian: Արմեն Մասիհի Քոչարյան; Persian: آرمن مسیحی کوچاریان; born 1948) is an Iranian Armenian physician and cardiologist who is the first children's heart specialist in Iran.

== Early life ==
Kocharian was born in Gholhak, a neighborhood in Northern Tehran, in 1948. He attended the Kooshesh Armenian High School. Later, he enrolled in the medical field at Ahvaz Jundishapur University of Medical Sciences in 1969. He graduated in 1976. He specialized as a pediatrician in 1981. Finally, he received a specialty degree in cardiology with an emphasis on children from the Iran University of Medical Sciences. Today, he is a faculty member and professor at Tehran University of Medical Sciences Children's Medical Center.

== Important Papers ==
- Marsousi, Mahdi; Ahmadian, Alireza; Kocharian, Armen; Alirezaie, Javad (2011). "Active Ellipse Model and Automatic Chamber Detection in Apical Views of Echocardiography Images". Ultrasound in Medicine & Biology. 37 (12): 2055–65. doi:10.1016/j.ultrasmedbio.2011.09.001. PMID 22033131.
- Sepehri, Amir A.; Gharehbaghi, Arash; Dutoit, Thierry; Kocharian, Armen; Kiani, A. (2010). "A novel method for pediatric heart sound segmentation without using the ECG". Computer Methods and Programs in Biomedicine. 99 (1): 43–8. doi:10.1016/j.cmpb.2009.10.006. PMID 20036439.
- Evaluation of the relationship of echocardiographic left ventricular mass to amounts of transfusions of packed cell and Deferoxamine in Thalassemia major
- MUMPS MYOCARDITIS AS A CAUSE OF NEONATAL CARDIOGENIC SHOCK
- PROLONGED DISPERSION OF QT AND QTC IN THALASSEMIA MAJOR PATIENTS
- A Newborn Infant with a Pulsatile Substernal Structure in a Midline Defect; Cantrell's Syndrome

== See also ==
- Iranian Armenians
- Science in Iran
