= Robert Armen =

American judge (born 1947)

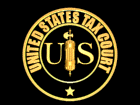

Robert N. Armen Jr. (born Pennsylvania, 1947) is a former special trial judge of the United States Tax Court.

== Career ==
Armen graduated from Duquesne University with a B.A. in 1969, and earned his J.D. at Georgetown University in 1973. He and went on to receive an LL.M. from Cleveland State University in 1979.

After working for the Office of Chief Counsel for the Internal Revenue Service (Cleveland District Counsel) from 1973 to 1978, Armen worked in the Criminal Tax Division from 1978 to 1979, as Washington District Counsel from 1979 to 1981, and as a law clerk to United States Tax Court Judge Howard A. Dawson, Jr. from 1981 to 1983.

He was Assistant Clerk of the Court from 1983 to 1985, and then became Deputy Counsel to the Chief Judge, 1986–93. He was made adjunct professor at University of Baltimore Law School (Graduate Tax Program, 1988–90), and the Northern Virginia Community College (Business Division, 1981–89). Armen was appointed as a Special Trial Judge, United States Tax Court on August 27, 1993.

He retired from active service on August 31, 2019.

== Attribution ==
Material on this page was copied from the website of the United States Tax Court, which is published by a United States government agency, and is therefore in the public domain.
