= Georgi Martirosian =

Soviet researcher

Docent Georgi Martirosian
- Born: 1895; Tbilisi, Tiflis Governorate, Russian Empire
- Died: March 10, 1938 (aged 42–43); RSFSR, Soviet Union
- Cause of death: Executed by shooting during the Great Purge (posthumously rehabilitated in 1956)
- Scientific career
- Fields: local history
- Workplaces: Ingush Research Institute of Local History

Georgi Konstantinovich Martirosian (Note: also spelled Martirosyan; Russian: Георгий Константинович Мартиросиан, Armenian: Գևորգ Կոստանդինի Մարտիրոսյան, romanized: Gevorg Kostandini Martirosyan) (c. 1895 – 10 March 1938) was a Soviet local historian of Armenian origin. His monograph History of Ingushiya published in 1933 is one of the most referenced works in modern studies of history of Ingushetia.

== Biography ==
Georgi was born in 1895 in Tiflis, the administrative center of the Tiflis Governorate of the Russian Empire, to an Armenian family.

In 1924, a member of the scientific society of the Mountaineer Pedagogical Institute, Georgi, in a brief bibliographical note, made an attempt to summarize knowledge about local newspapers and magazines:

Many events took place in the life of Vladikavkaz, and one cannot help but want to summarize the general, preliminary results of the city periodical press, in which, for better or worse, traces of local economic life and the political storms that swept over the region were preserved. The establishment of the first periodical press organ in Vladikavkaz dates back to the time after the end of the Caucasian War.

He worked as an assistant, then an associate professor at the Mountain Agricultural Institute in Vladikavkaz, deputy director of the Ingush Research Institute of Local History.

Arrested in 1935, he served his time in Kolyma. On 8 March 1938, the NKVD for Dalstroy sentenced him to death by shooting on charges of participating in the activities of a counter-revolutionary rebel organization. The sentence was carried out on 10 March in the territory of the modern Magadan region. On 7 September 1956 he was posthumously rehabilitated.

== Works ==
- Martirosian, G. K. (1912). О культурно-просветительных обществах «Вестника знания» [About the cultural and educational societies of the "Bulletin of Knowledge"] (in Russian). Vladikavkaz: Elektro-tipografia A. FM Gabisova. pp. 1–16.
- Martirosian, G. K. (1918). "Светлый праздник (К открытию Политехнического Института)" [Bright holiday (To the opening of the Polytechnic Institute)]. Narodnaya vlast (in Russian). No. 179. Vladikavkaz.
- Martirosian, G. K. (1918). "Торжественное открытие Политехнического Института" [Grand opening of the Polytechnic Institute]. Narodnaya vlast (in Russian). No. 176. Vladikavkaz.
- Martirosian, G. K. (1922). Богатства Терского Края [Riches of the Terek Region] (in Russian). Vladikavkaz. pp. 1–8.
- Martirosian, G. K. (1924). Фабрично-заводская промышленность на Тереке [Factory industry on Terek] (in Russian). Vladikavkaz: Vlad. gub. otd. nar. obr. pp. 1–112.
- Martirosian, G. K. (1924). "Владикавказская периодическая печать" [Vladikavkaz periodical press]. Сб. научного общества при Горском педагогическом институте [Collection of the scientific society at the Mountaineer Pedagogical Institute] (in Russian). Vladikavkaz: Izd. Nauchnogo obshchestva etnogr. yaz. i literatury pri Gorskom pedagogicheskom in-t.
- Martirosian, G. K. (1925). Социально-экономические основы революционных движений на Тереке [Socio-economic foundations of revolutionary movements on the Terek] (in Russian). Vladikavkaz: Tipografia Ingushii "Svet". pp. 1–112.
- Martirosian, G. K. (1928). "Нагорная Ингушетия : Социально-экономический очерк" [Nagorno-Ingushetia: Socio-economic essay]. Izv. Ing. nauchno-issledovatelskogo in-t kraevedeniya (in Russian). 1. Vladikavkaz: Izd-vo Ing. nauchno-issledovatelskogo in-t kraevedeniya: 1–154.
- Martirosian, G. K. (1928). "Ингушетия в административном отношении" [Ingushetia in administrative terms]. Izv. Ing. nauchno-issledovatelskogo in-t kraevedeniya (in Russian). 1. Vladikavkaz: Izd-vo Ing. nauchno-issledovatelskogo in-t kraevedeniya.
- Martirosian, G. K. (1929). Колхозное строительство в ингушской деревне [Collective farm construction in an Ingush village] (in Russian). Vladikavkaz. pp. 1–29.
- Martirosian, G. K. (1929). Терская область в революции 1905 года [Terek region in the revolution of 1905] (in Russian). Vladikavkaz: Tipo-foto-tsinkografia. pp. 1–118.
- Martirosian, G. K. (1930). Революционное движение в войсках Терской области в 1905 г. : (материалы) [Revolutionary movement in the troops of the Terek region in 1905: (materials)] (in Russian). Vladikavkaz: Tipo-foto-tsinkografia izd-va "Rastdzinnad". pp. 1–10.

== Assessment ==
Maryam Dolgieva, Magomed Kartoev, Nurdin Kodzoev and Timur Matiev:

Many of these works have not lost their scientific significance to this day and are among the most cited in modern studies on the history of Ingushetia. The latter include "History of Ingushiya", as well as other works by G.K. Martirosian, (Note: Namely, Martirosian, G. K. (1925). Социально-экономические основы революционных достижений на Тереке [Socio-economic foundations of revolutionary achievements on the Terek] (in Russian). Vladikavkaz: Tipografia Ingushii "Svet". pp. 1–112. (see Dolgieva et al. 2013, p. 32 (citation 95).) an employee of the Ingush Research Institute [...]

Makka Albogachieva, Valery Tishkov, Lyubov Solovyeva:

In 1933, G.K. Martirosian turned to the Ingush theme in the book "History of Ingushiya", having examined in detail the stages of ethnic history, various aspects of material and spiritual culture, and features of the socio-economic development of Ingushetia.

== Sources ==
- Albogachieva, M. S.-G.; Tishkov, V. A.; Solovyeva, L. T. (2013). "Введение" [Introduction]. In Albogachieva, M. S.-G.; Martazanov, A. M.; Solovyeva, L. T. (eds.). Ингуши [The Ingush] (in Russian). Moscow: Nauka. pp. 5–10.
- Biryukov, A. M. (1999). "Мартиросьян, Георгий Константинович" [Martirosyan, Georgi Konstantinovich]. In Abramov, S. V. (ed.). За нами придут корабли [Ships will come for us] (in Russian). Magadan: Magadanskoe kn. izd-vo.
- Dolgieva, M. B.; Kartoev, M. M.; Kodzoev, N. D.; Matiev, T. Kh. (2013). Kodzoev, N. D.; et al. (eds.). История Ингушетии [History of Ingushetia] (4th ed.). Rostov-Na-Donu: Yuzhnyy izdatelsky dom. pp. 1–600. ISBN 978-5-98864-056-1.
- "Историческая справка" [Historical reference]. Ingush Research Institute of the Humanities named after Ch. E. Akhriev (in Russian). Archived from the original on 2023-06-09.
- Martirosian, G. K. (1924). "Владикавказская периодическая печать" [Vladikavkaz periodical press]. Сб. научного общества при Горском педагогическом институте [Collection of the scientific society at the Mountaineer Pedagogical Institute] (in Russian). Vladikavkaz: Izd. Nauchnogo obshchestva etnogr. yaz. i literatury pri Gorskom pedagogicheskom in-t.
