= Armen Orujyan =

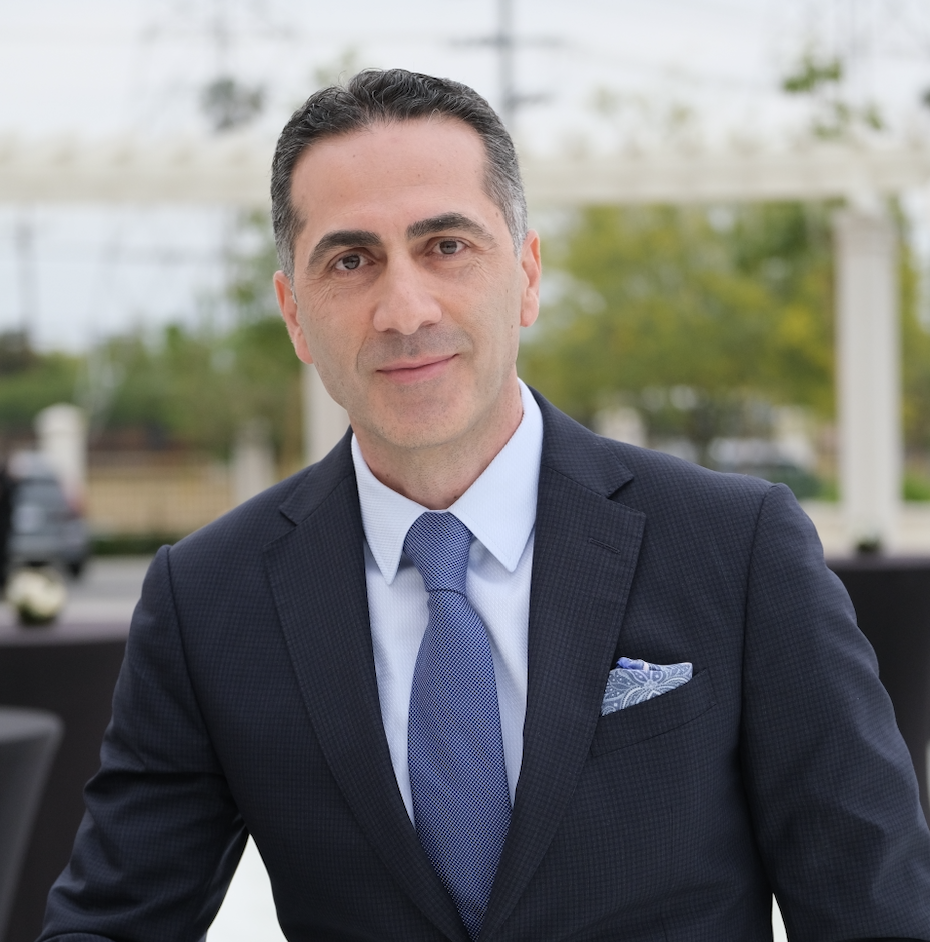
- Born: 15 February 1974 (age 52)
- Education: University of California, Los Angeles; Claremont Graduate University
- Occupations: an Armenian-American entrepreneur, architect of innovation ecosystems
- Website: curio.ventures

Armen Orujyan (born 15 February 1974) is an Armenian-American entrepreneur, an architect of innovation ecosystems and the Founder and CEO of Curio Ventures. He founded the youth entrepreneurship platform Athgo and served as its chairman for almost two decades. In 2012 he was appointed co‑chair of the United Nations’ Global Alliance for Information and Communication Technologies and Development (GAID) and joined the UN Broadband Commission for Digital Development as a commissioner. In 2017 he became the founding chief executive officer of the Foundation for Armenian Science and Technology (FAST), a non‑profit organisation working to develop Armenia's science and technology ecosystem. Orujyan served as FAST's CEO until 2025, when he joined its board of trustees.

== Early life and education ==
Orujyan was born in Armenia and immigrated to California as a teenager in 1989.

He studied political science at the University of California, Los Angeles, graduating with a Bachelor of Arts degree, and later earned a master's degree and a PhD from Claremont Graduate University’s School of Politics and Economics.

== Career ==
Earlier in his career, Orujyan entered the national political arena serving as an advisor for various US political campaigns, including the Presidential Election. In 2001, championing opportunities for youth and the disadvantaged, Orujyan initiated a human rights movement that brought over 40,000 young people and concerned citizens onto the streets of Los Angeles. Leveraging the power of social media and the convening power of youth, the movement has since turned into an annual observance, attracting over 150,000 galvanized people.

=== Athgo ===
In 1999 Orujyan founded Athgo, an entrepreneurship platform intended to provide opportunities for young innovators. The organisation gained consultative status with the United Nations Economic and Social Council, the UN Department of Public Information and the World Intellectual Property Organization.

Athgo organised recurring innovation forums at UN headquarters in New York and at the World Bank in Washington, D.C., bringing together young entrepreneurs, policymakers and corporate leaders.

=== United Nations roles ===
In April 2012 the International Telecommunication Union announced that Orujyan had been appointed one of eight new commissioners of the Broadband Commission for Digital Development.

Later that year he and Daniel Stauffacher were asked by the UN Secretary-General's office to conduct a review of the Global Alliance for Information and Communication Technologies and Development (GAID) and to serve as its co-chairs. The ICT4Peace Foundation reported that Orujyan and Stauffacher would present their recommendations to the UN General Assembly in September 2012.

=== Foundation for Armenian Science and Technology ===
In 2016 Russian-Armenian philanthropists Ruben Vardanyan and Noubar Afeyan invited Orujyan to help establish a new foundation that would promote science and technology in Armenia. After visiting Armenia he accepted the offer, and the Foundation for Armenian Science and Technology (FAST) was formally launched in June 2017.

Orujyan became the foundation's Founding CEO on 1 November 2017.

Under Orujyan's leadership, FAST launched several major flagship initiatives to build Armenia's science and technology ecosystem: Unit 1991, a program in collaboration with the Ministry of Defence to teach mathematics and machine learning to conscripts and volunteers; the Science and Technology Angels Network (STAN), Armenia's first angel-network for science and tech startups; the Advance Research Grants (ADVANCE) program, begun in 2020, which pairs local Armenian researchers with international principal investigators, funding multi-year, interdisciplinary STEM projects and boosting research output and publications. He also initiated Generation AI, a multi-layered educational pipeline from high school through higher education, integrating advanced math, AI instruction, and project-based learning in partnership with the Ministry of Education. The Advanced Solutions Center on AI and Machine Learning (ASCENT) was established to translate research breakthroughs into prototypes and commercially viable technologies. FAST under Orujyan hosted the Global Innovation Forums (GIF), a large-scale conferences bringing together hundreds of global experts, entrepreneurs, and scientists in Yerevan to showcase Armenia's potential in AI, innovation, and research collaboration.

In December 2024, Orujyan formally stepped down as CEO of FAST. He joined the foundation's Board of Trustees, while then Vice President of FAST was appointed to take over as executive director effective 1 January 2025.

=== Other activities ===
Orujyan served on the Board of Advisors of the Baker Institute for Public Policy at Rice University from April 2017 until April 2024.

He is also a member of the Global Council of the Asia Society, and serves on the Presidential Advisory Council of the Office of the President of Rwanda.

== Awards ==
In 2012 Claremont Graduate University presented Orujyan with its Distinguished Alumni Award.
