= Armen Grigoryan (guitarist) =

Russian singer

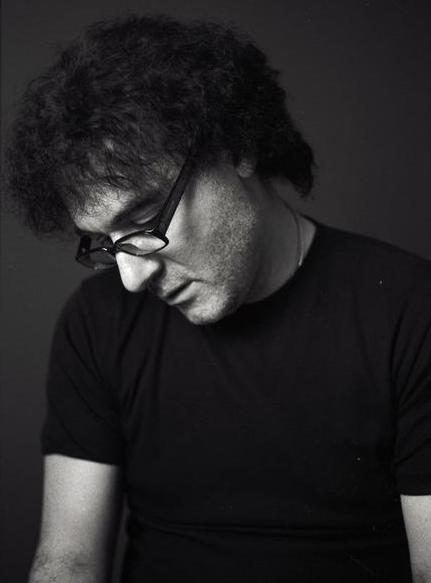

Background information
- Born: Armen Sergeevich Grigoryan; November 24, 1960 (age 65); Moscow, RSFSR, Soviet Union
- Genres: Rock
- Instruments: Guitar, harmonica
- Years active: 1978-
- Labels: Melodiya, Moroz, Soyuz, Kvadro-Disk
- Website: www.crematorium.ru

Armen Grigoryan (Russian: Армен Григорян, Armenian: Արմեն Գրիգորյան) is a singer/songwriter, artist, and the front man (and main songwriter) of "Krematorij" (Crematorium) Russian rock-band.

== Biography ==
Armen Grigoryan was born on November 24, 1960, in Moscow to Armenian parents. During school time, he was a classmate of Sergey Golovkin, who later became a notorious serial killer. A player of Dynamo Moscow, Grigoryan became a two-time champion of junior football.

He grew up listening to the magic sounds of The Beatles mysteriously penetrating the Iron Curtain. Inspired by Beatle's music, Grigoryan, while still in high school, started his musical career (from 1977 he played in a band called "Atmospheric pressure") and in 1983 he formed "Crematorium" which gained a reputation throughout the former Soviet Union and began to perform at concerts all over the country. A long search for his own unique sounds came to fruition in 1984, when "Krematorij" added a violin to their version of Rock-n-Roll. Since the 1980s, Armen Grigoryan has participated in the development of Russian rock music.

Armen Grigoryan is an author of more than two hundred songs. Many of them, including "Krematorij", "Tanya", "Kondrati", "Trash Wind", "Khabibulin", "Ugly Elsa", "Sebastia", "Sexy Cat", "Strawberry with Ice", "Little Girl", "2001" and "Katmandu", are very popular among the audiences throughout the former Soviet Union, the Netherlands, Germany, Israel and the United States. He composes multifaceted lyrics that frequently deal with the themes of life and death in various religious contexts. Grigoryan's "ironical and philosophical songs are fond of sincerity and humanity".

"The red-haired trouble of the neighbourhood
The first fiddle; that was understood
All her days
Like a zebra's skin
She used to be happy
But now she's in
Chinese tank ..." (transl. K. Leonov)

In 2006 Armen Grigoryan started a new project 3' Angel and released the album "Chinese Tank". According to critics, the album's concept is the spirit of excitement, adventure and immutable truths, tied up with modern realities.

Armen Grigoryan is an author of several architectural projects. He is also known as a painter and public activist. Grigoryan is considered as one of the 100 famous Armenians living in Russia by the readers of “Noah's Ark” newspaper. In 2012 "Krematorij" issued a petition urging the Russian State Duma to criminalize all forms of nazism, including the Armenian genocide.

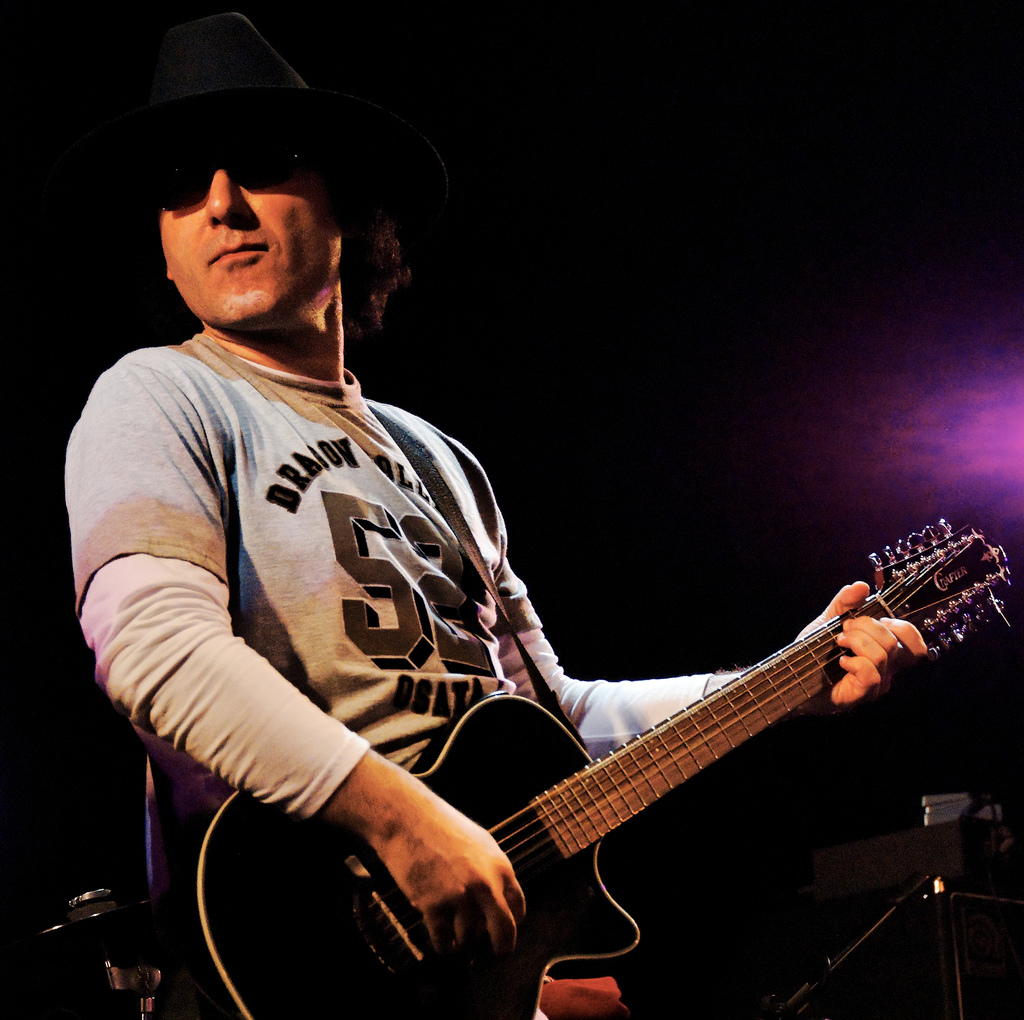
Armen Grigoryan

In 2012 "Krematorij" and other well-known Russian musicians (Yuri Shevchuk, Bravo, Noize MC, etc.) recorded the "White Album" to show solidarity with opponents of President Vladimir Putin. The album took its name from the white ribbons worn by demonstrators during the opposition rallies.

In 2019 Armen Grigoryan wrote the first authorized biography of the Krematorij, “Ghosts of the Krematorij".

In June 2023 a collection of Grigoryan's best songs translated into different languages was released.

== Discography (solo) ==
- Armen Grigoryan and "3' Angel" - "Kitaysky Tank" (Chinese Tank) (2006)

== Filmography ==
- Tatsu (1994 film)
- Brother 2 (soundtrack: "Katmandu")
- How to Find the Ideal
- Studenty, film serial (songtrack), 2006.

== Other websites ==
- Official site of Crematorium
- 3' Angel
- - RussMus.Net: Krematorij Lyrics and English translations (English)
- Rock in Armenia and Armenians in Rock
- Fan-club (in Russian)
- Crematorium at Peoples.ru
- Songs collection
- Армен Григорян. Клубника со льдом. Песни, Москва, 2002(in Russian)
