= Armen Trchounian =

Armenian biophysicist (1956–2020)

- Born: 29 April 1956; Yerevan, Armenian SSR, USSR
- Died: 18 November 2020 (aged 64)
- Citizenship: Armenian SSR and Armenia
- Education: Yerevan State University
- Awards: RA's President Award, ASM 2020 Moselio Schaecter Award
- Scientific career
- Fields: Biophysics, Microbiology, Biochemistry, Biotechnology
- Workplaces: Ministry of Science and Education of RA and Yerevan State University
- Thesis: (DSc in Biological Sciences (1990))
- Website: http://ysu.am/science/en/Armen-Trchounian

Armen Trchounian (Armenian: Արմեն Թռչունյան, Russian: Армен Трчунян, 29 April 1956 – 18 November 2020) was an Armenian biophysicist. D.Sc. in Biological sciences (1990) and professor (2002), Corresponding Member of NAS RA (2006) and Head of the Department of Biochemistry, Microbiology, and Biotechnology of Yerevan State University (2016–2020).

== Early life and education ==
Armen Trchounian was born on 29 April 1956, in Yerevan, Armenian SSR, USSR. He graduated from Yerevan State University with an honor diploma (1978), was awarded a PhD (1982), and D.Sc. (1990) from the USSR Supreme Certifying Commission, Moscow.

== Career and research ==
In 1981, Trchounian started work at the Department of Biophysics of YSU as a Junior Researcher, then continued as a senior researcher until 1990. He was a Leading Researcher (Research Professor) (1990–1994) and Professor at the same department (1993–2011).

Trchounian's works are dedicated to Bioenergetic aspects of fermenting Microorganisms and biohydrogen production by fermenting and Phototrophic bacteria. His research mainly concentrated on proton and other ion transport across the membrane, relationship with the proton-translocating two-sector ATPase (EC 7.1.2.2, F_{o}F_{1}-ATPase), and its role in particular molecular hydrogen production by various Hydrogenases. Trchounian's research focused on the application of microbial hydrogenase systems in industrial hydrogen gas production. He also contributed to the research of metal nanoparticles and study of their properties.

Armen Trchounian was a Fulbright Scholar at the University of Chicago, US (1991–1992); Invited Professor at Chiba University, Japan and Visiting Fellow at the University of Reading, UK, and University of Virginia, Charlottesville, USA. He visited Martin-Luther University of Halle-Wittenberg, Halle, Germany for academic stay by DAAD fellowships.

In 2001–2002 he worked at the Ministry of Education and Science as the head of the Department of training of scientific and pedagogical personnel. In 2002–2010 he was the president of the Supreme Certifying Commission of RA.

Since 2006, he was a professor at the Russian-Armenian University in Yerevan, Armenia. In 2011–2016, he was the Head of the Department of Microbiology and Plant and Microbial Biotechnologies of YSU, then the Head of Department of Biochemistry, Microbiology, and Biotechnology (2016–2020).

He had a Class rank of state counselor of the 2nd class of the civil service of the Republic of Armenia (the RA President's decree, 2006).

In 2006, he was elected as a Corresponding Member of the National Academy of Sciences of Armenia; was a laureate of the Armenian President's Prize for Development in Natural Sciences and other national and international prizes and awards. He has been a member of the American Society for Microbiology (ASM) since 1999, was awarded Leadership Grant for International Educators by UNESCO and ASM (2009), and has been recognized for Outstanding service in ASM Minority Mentoring Program (2011).

=== Scientific career ===
- 1981–1994 – Junior, Senior, then Leading Researcher at the Department of Biophysics of Yerevan State University, Armenia
- 1993–2011 – Professor at the Department of Biophysics of Yerevan State University, Armenia
- 1988 – Fellow at the Institute of Biophysics of the USSR Academy of Sciences, Pushchino, Moscow, Russia
- 1991–1992 – Fulbright Scholar at the Department of Molecular Genetics and Cell Biology of the University of Chicago, US
- 1995 – Research Fellow, then Invited Professor at the Faculty of Pharmaceutical Sciences of Chiba University, Japan
- 1998–1999 and 2000–2001 – Visiting professor at the School of Animal and Microbial Sciences of the University of Reading, UK
- 1999–2000 – Research Fellow at the Department of Molecular Physiology and Biological Physics of the University of Virginia, Charlottesville, US
- 2013 – Visited Institute of Biology/Microbiology of Martin-Luther University of Halle-Wittenberg, Halle, Germany for academic stay by DAAD fellowships
- Since 2015 – Principal investigator and Head of the Laboratory of Microbiology, Bioenergetics and Biotechnology of Institute of Biology of Yerevan State University
- 2011–2016 – Head of the Department of Microbiology, Plant and Microbial Biotechnologies of Yerevan State University, Armenia
- 2016–2020 – Head of Department of Biochemistry, Microbiology and Biotechnology of Yerevan State University, Armenia

== Memberships ==
- 2009 – Armenian Microbiological Association (FEMS Member Society)
- 2009 – International Academy for National Security Problems, Russia
- 2008 – International Engineering Academy, Russia
- 2007 – Armenian Engineering Academy, Armenia
- 2007 – Member of Bureau of the Division of Natural Sciences of the NAS RA
- 2006 – European Academy of Natural Sciences, Germany
- 2006 – Academy of Medical Technical Sciences of Russian Federation, Russia
- 2006 – International Union of Science Knights, Germany
- 2006 – National Academy of Sciences (NAS) of RA
- 2005 – Honored Member of the ''Ararat'' International Academy of Sciences, France
- 2005 – Armenian Academy of Pedagogical-Psychological Sciences
- 2004 – Armenian Association of Biochemists (FEBS Member Society); since 2009 – Member of the Council
- 2003 – Russian Academy of Natural Sciences, Russia
- 2002 – Council of Eolyan Republican Hematological Center, Ministry of Health of the RA
- 2000 – Biology Program Educational Commission under the National Institute of Education, Yerevan, Armenia
- 1998 – Research Board of Advisors, American Biographical Institute, USA
- 1998 – Member and Ambassador of American Society for Microbiology in Armenia
- 1998 – Biophysical Societies, USA
- 1994 – The New York Academy of Sciences, USA
- 1993–1999 – Chairman of Educational-Methodical Board
- 1991 – European Bioelectromagnetic Association, Belgium-France-Germany
- 1991 – All-Armenian Biophysical Society, Armenia (IUPAB Observer Society); since 1995 – Member of the Executive Board
- 1990 – Council of Faculty of Biology of Yerevan State University
- 1988–1990 – Supervisor of the Student Scientific Society of Biological Faculty of Yerevan State University
- 1982 – International Bioelectrochemical Scientific Society, USA-France-Germany-Italy-Russia

== Awards ==
Prizes

- 2020 – Moselio Schaecter Award, American Society for Microbiology, Washington, D.C., US
- 2019 – The Honored Scientist of the Republic of Armenia
- 2016 – International Association of Hydrogen Energy Akira Mitsui Award
- 2015 – Prize of UN Industrial Development Organization (UNIDO) Innovation Projects National Competition
- 2014 – The outstanding service award of International Association of Hydrogen Energy for altruistic contribution to the cause of Hydrogen economy
- 2011 – The scientific award of excellence – 2011 of the American Biographical Institute (US) in the field of Biophysics & Biotechnology
- 2010 – Award of the National Academy of Sciences of RA, Ministry of Diaspora of RA, and Armenians Union of Russia for the best scientific paper in Natural Sciences in 2008
- 2003 – Prize of the President of RA for the Achievement in Natural sciences
- 1984 – Prize for young scientists of YSU

Orders and Medals

- 2020 – 1st degree Medal "For Services provided to the Motherland" for his contribution to the field of science and education and many years of dedicated work in Armenia (awarded posthumously), Decree of the President of RA
- 2018 – Medal of the President of the National Assembly of RA, Yerevan, Armenia
- 2016 – Gold Medal of State Committee of Science, Ministry of Education and Science of the Republic of Armenia
- 2016 – Medal of the Academy of Engineering Sciences after A.M. Prokhorov of Russian Federation
- 2012, 2009 – Jubilee Medal "Military Forces of Armenia. 20 years", Marshal Baghramyan Medal, Ministry of Defense of RA
- 2011, 2008, 2003 – Robert Koch Medal, Vladimir Negovsky Medal, Rudolf Virchow Medal, European Academy of Natural Sciences (Germany)
- 2010 – Khachatur Abovyan Medal, Armenian Pedagogical State University, Yerevan; Gold Medal of the Military Medicine Faculty, Yerevan State Medical University, Yerevan; Jubilee Medal of Armenians Union of Russia, Moscow
- 2008 – Honorary Medal, Armenian Engineering Academy
- 2007 – Academician N.M. Sissakian Medal, Russian Academy of Natural Sciences for the Achievement in Biochemistry and Space Biomedicine (Russia)
- 2007 – M. Lomonosov Order of the National Committee of Public Rewards of the Russian Federation (Russia)
- 2006 – Order of the Star of Senator of the European Academy of Natural Sciences, Germany
- 2006 – Gold Medals of Yerevan State University and Yerevan State Architecture-Construction University
- 2005 – Gold Medal of Yerevan State Medical University, Memorable Medal of Yerevan State Linguistic University; Honor Deed of the Chairman of the National Assembly of RA for Scientific Achievements
- 2004 – Honor Cross Order of Merit of the European Academy of Natural Sciences, Germany
- 2004 – Memorable Gold Medal of the Ministry of Education and Science of RA
- 1979 – Memorable Medal for the best student research paper of Armenia, Ministry of Higher and Middle Professional Education of Armenia

Honors

- 2014 – Honorary Professor, Russian-Armenian (Slavonic) State University, Yerevan
- 2007 – Honorary Professor, Mesrop Mashtots University, Stepanakert

== Publications ==
He published over 300 peer-reviewed papers and reviews in leading international journals, and attended >80 international conferences giving keynote lectures and oral presentations. He was an Editor of peer-reviewed international journals (Elsevier, Frontiers, Hindawi) and Editorial member of numerous international journals.

=== Books ===
- Trchounian A, Bioenergetics, Book, YSU publishing, 2019, 292 p. (in Armenian)
- Trchounian A, Gabrielyan L, Mnatsakanyan N, Metal Nanoparticles (eds. Y. Saylor, V. Irby): Chapter 4. Nanoparticles of Various Transition Metals and Their Applications as Antimicrobial Agents | Nova Science Publishers. 2018, 161–211 pp.
- Aghajanyan A, Trchounian A, Plant Biochemistry: Laboratory Practicals, YSU publishing 2017, 152p. (in Armenian)
- Trchounian A, Petrosyan M, Sahakyan N, Redox State as a Central Regulator of Plant-Cell Stress Responses. Chapter 2. Plant Cell Redox Homeostasis and Reactive Oxygen Species (Ed. D.K. Gupta et al.) | Springer International. 2016, 25 p.
- Trchounian A, Panosyan H, Bazukyan I, Margaryan A, Popov Y, (2014) Microbiology Laboratory Practicals, YSU publishing 2014, 316 p. (in Armenian)
- Petrosyan M, Azaryan K, Trchounian A, (2013) Plant Physiology Laboratory Practicals (in Armenian), Yerevan, YSU Publishing, 126 p.
- Gevorgyan E, Danielyan F, Essayan A, Grigoryan K, Trchounian A, Nerkararyan A, Sevoyan G, Vardevanyan P, Biology: 2222 test-book, Yerevan, Astghik publishing house, 2009, 428 p. (in Armenian)
- Trchounian A, Potassium transport by bacteria: electrochemical approach, energetics and mechanisms, 2009, Chapter of book | In Bacterial Membranes. A. Trchounian (ed.). Res. Signpost: Kerala (India), pp. 65–111
- Poladyan A, Trchounian A, Production of molecular hydrogen by mixed-acid fermentation in bacteria and its energetics, 2009, Chapter of book | In Bacterial Membranes. A. Trchounian (ed.). Res. Signpost: Kerala (India), pp. 197–231
- Gabrielyan L, Trchounian A, Purple bacteria and cyanobacteria as potential producers of molecular hydrogen: an electrochemical and bioenergetics approach, 2009, Chapter of book | In Bacterial Membranes. A. Trchounian (ed.). Res. Signpost: Kerala (India), pp. 233–273
- Akopyan K, Trchounian A, Proton conductance of bacterial membrane and its role in cell functional activity, 2009, Chapter of book | In Bacterial Membranes. A. Trchounian (ed.). Res. Signpost: Kerala (India), pp. 37–63
- Trchounian A, Surface charge and other physical properties of bacterial membranes, 2009, Chapter of book | In Bacterial Membranes. A. Trchounian (ed.). Res. Signpost: Kerala (India), pp. 23–35
- Hovnanyan K, Trchounian A, Cell wall and cytoplasmic membrane structures of some bacteria: novel data and role in pathology, 2009, Chapter of Book, In Bacterial Membranes. A. Trchounian (ed.). Res. Signpost: Kerala (India), pp. 1–21
- Vassilian A, Trchounian A, Environment oxidation-reduction potential and redox sensing by bacteria, 2009, Chapter of Book, In Bacterial Membranes. A. Trchounian (ed.). Res. Signpost: Kerala (India), pp. 163–195
- Trchounian A., Current State and Development Trends in the Highest Scientific Certification, Monography, Yerevan, 60 p. (in Armenian and Russian, English Summary)
- Trchounian A (2001) Biological Membranes, Yerevan, Zangak-97, 192 pages (in Armenian – Թռչունյան Ա.Հ., Կենսաբանական թաղանթներ, Դասագիրք, Երևան̦, Զանգակ-97̦, 2001)

=== Selected publications ===
- Bagramyan K, Mnatsakanyan N, Poladian A, Vassilian A, Trchounian A. The roles of hydrogenases 3 and 4, and the F0F1-ATPase, in H2 production by Escherichia coli at alkaline and acidic pH. FEBS letters. 2002 Apr 10;516(1–3):172-8.
- Trchounian A. Escherichia coli proton-translocating F0F1-ATP synthase and its association with solute secondary transporters and/or enzymes of anaerobic oxidation–reduction under fermentation. Biochemical and biophysical research communications. 2004 Mar 19;315(4):1051-7.
- Trchounian K, Trchounian A. Hydrogenase 2 is most and hydrogenase 1 is less responsible for H2 production by Escherichia coli under glycerol fermentation at neutral and slightly alkaline pH. International Journal of Hydrogen Energy. 2009 Nov 1;34(21):8839–45.
- Trchounian K, Poladyan A, Vassilian A, Trchounian A. Multiple and reversible hydrogenases for hydrogen production by Escherichia coli: dependence on fermentation substrate, pH and the F0F1-ATPase. Critical Reviews in Biochemistry and Molecular Biology. 2012 Jun 1;47(3):236-49.
- Trchounian A. Mechanisms for hydrogen production by different bacteria during mixed-acid and photo-fermentation and perspectives of hydrogen production biotechnology. Critical reviews in biotechnology. 2015 Jan 2;35(1):103-13.
- Trchounian K, Sawers RG, Trchounian A. Improving biohydrogen productivity by microbial dark-and photo-fermentations: novel data and future approaches. Renewable and Sustainable Energy Reviews. 2017 Dec 1;80:1201–16.
- Trchounian A, Trchounian K. Fermentation revisited: how do microorganisms survive under energy-limited conditions?. Trends in biochemical sciences. 2019 May 1;44(5):391–400.

=== Theses ===
- Трчунян А.А., Дрожжевый экстракт как источник азота при росте и выделении молекулярного водорода пурпурной бактерией Rhodobacter sphaeroides, “Проблемы биохимии, радиационной и космической биологии”, Алушта, 5–9 сентября, с. 61–64 (co-author)
- Trchounyan A., Creation of new ferments with lactic acid bacteria from dairy products of different regions of Armenia | ISTC Conference «Modern State of Biotechnological Developments and Ways of Their Commercialization», Yerevan, Armenia, 2012, pp. 59–60 (co-author)
- Trchounyan A., Some properties of lactic acidnbacteria isolated in Armenia | ISTC International conference: «Bacteriophages and Probiotics–Alternatives to Antibiotics», Tbilisi, Georgia, 2012, p. 106 (co-author)
- Trchounian A., Is the high potassium ion concentration requested for the E. coli growth and metabolic activity? | Sov. Biotechnology 1, 55 (co-author)
