= Armen Mkoyan =

Armenian businessman

Armen Sergeevich Mkoyan
- Արմեն Մկոյան
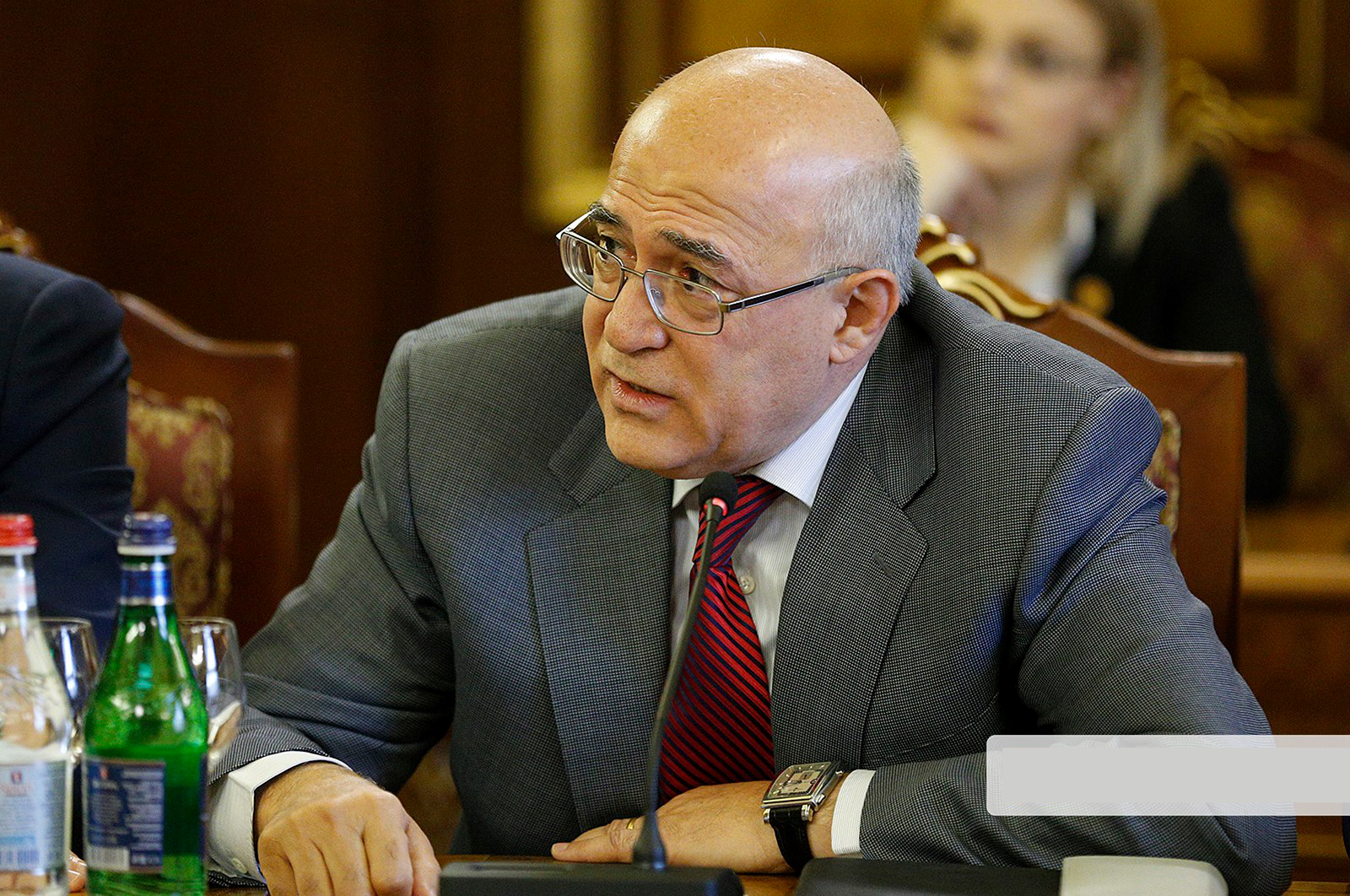
- Born: May 15, 1961 (age 65); Samtskhe-Javakheti, Georgian SSR, USSR
- Education: PhD in Physics from Moscow State University
- Occupations: Businessman, Founding President of Elite Group
- Awards: Anania Shirakatsi Medal, RA prime-minister’s commemorative medal

Armen Mkoyan is an Armenian businessman and founder of the Elite Group. He is also a member of the Board of Trustees of the "Support to Javakhk" Foundation and of the Presidency of the Union of Manufacturers and Businessmen of Armenia.

== Early life ==
Armen Mkoyan was born in the village of Diliska, Javakhk on May 15, 1961.

In 1975, he moved from Diliska to study in Yerevan, with a degree in Physics and Mathematics, graduating in 1978.

In 1977 and 1978, he won second place in the Republican Olympiad in Mathematics. In addition, in 1977, he also won second place in the Republican Olympiad in Physics.

In 1983, he graduated with honors from Yerevan State University Faculty of Physics with a diploma of Excellence (Red). From 1983 to 1985, he worked at "Lazerayin Tekhnika". He graduated with Honors from the Department of Quantum Radiophysics, Faculty of Physics, Lomonosov Moscow State University (MSU).

In 1989, he earned his PhD in Physics after submitting his dissertation on "The Quantum Theory of Collective Combination Scattering Quantum."

He passed the theoretical minimum of Landau which, during Landau's life, was passed by only 43 people worldwide. To date, only 3 Armenians have passed the Landau minimum.

In 1990 Mkoyan was elected a non-partisan member of the City Council of Yerevan.

== As an Entrepreneur ==
After the collapse of the USSR in 1991, Mkoyan left his scientific career to start a business importing products into Armenia, including lamps, leather, shoes, butter, and alcoholic beverages. Then, alongside a group of friends, he founded the "Punj" supermarket. Punj later bought 16% of Ardshinbank's shares, before losing them in 2002 when Ardshinbank went bankrupt. From 1996 - 2002, Mkoyan was a Board Member of Ardshinbank.

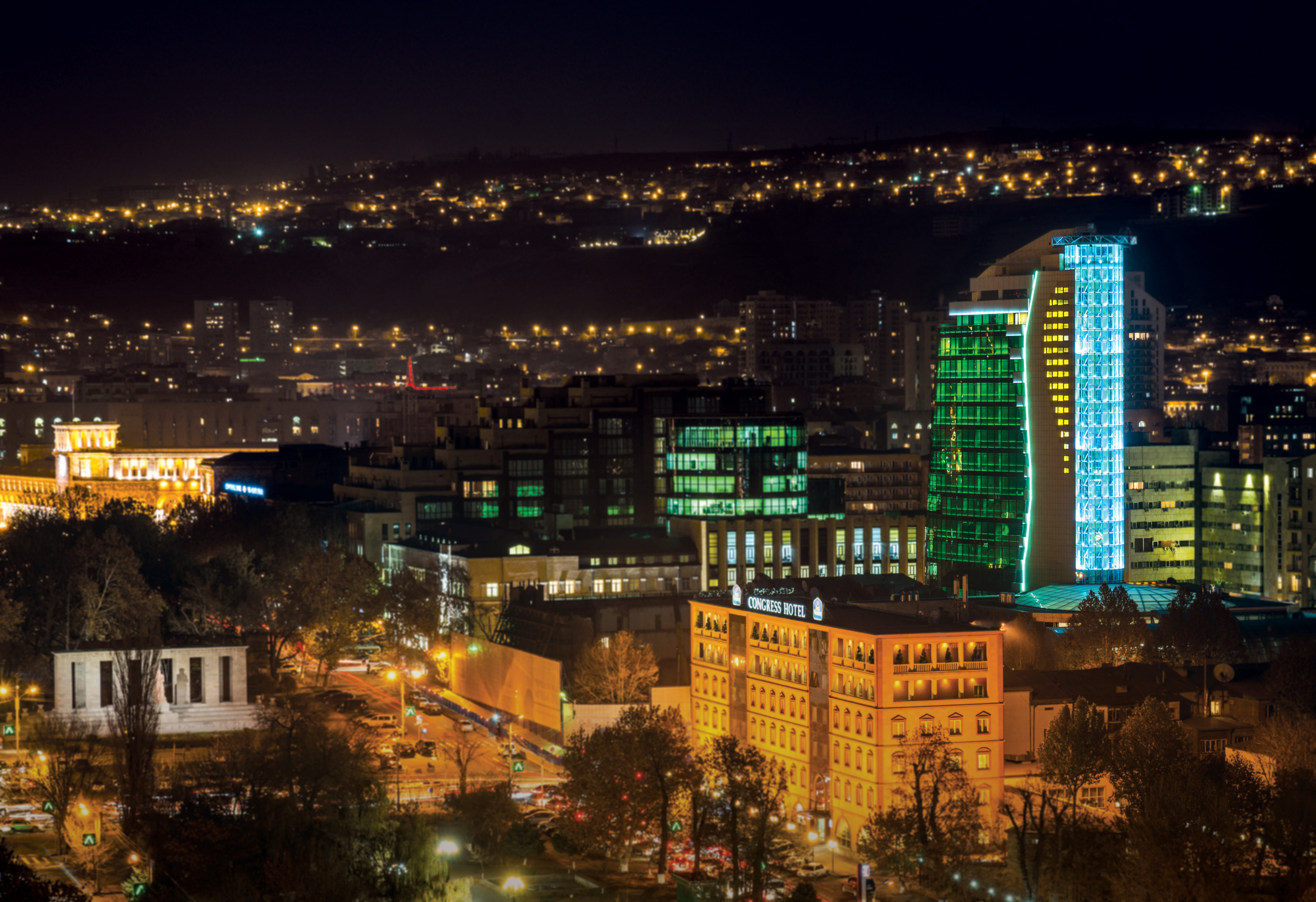
Elite Plaza Business Center in mini the Evening

In 2000, he founded the Elite Group real estate development company. He became a member of the Presidium of the Union of Manufacturers and Businessmen of Armenia. In 2011, he became a Member of the Board of Capital Asset Management - the first registered manager of investment and voluntary pension funds in Armenia.

== Awards and honors ==
In 2009 Armen Mkoyan was awarded the Armenian Prime Minister's Commemorative Medal for his work activities.

In 2015 he was awarded the Anania Shirakatsi Medal for his work in the economy.

== Personal life ==
Mkoyan is married and has 2 children.
