= Kitaysky Tank =

First solo-album of Armen Grigoryan and 3'Angel

Studio album by Armen Grigoryan 3'Angel
- Released: 2006
- Recorded: Russia, Ukraine, France, 2005–2006
- Genre: Rock
- Label: Kvadro-Disk

Kitaysky Tank (Russian: Китайский танк, Chinese tank) is the first solo-album of the Russian rock musician Armen Grigoryan and 3'Angel. The group is named so because this is the third team of Armen Grigoryan.

== History ==
The album was released in May 2006 and included 12 completely new songs. Two of them, "Chinese tank" and "Ragtime", were already well known to fans as they had a constant rotation on Nashe Radio, Radio Russia and radio "Silver Rain". These songs were used in the series "The students" on the Ren-TV.

== Track listing ==
1. Freddy Krueger
2. Agni Yoga
3. Chinese tank
4. L'amour De Trois
5. Student-hermit
6. My horse
7. Insanity is inevitable
8. XXXL
9. Dear father
10. It's the End, Sveta!
11. King-talker
12. Regtime (bonus track)
13. Agni-yoga (remix) (bonus track)
14. Chinese Tank (bonus track)
