= Sergo Hambardzumyan =

Armenian weightlifter (1910–1983)

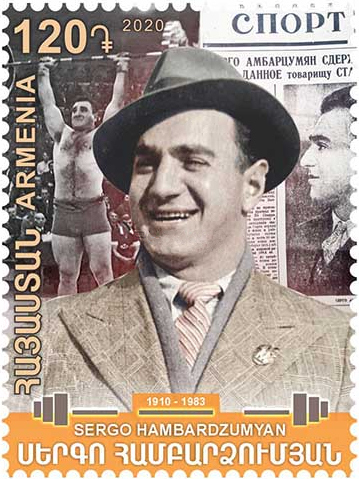
- Hambardzumyan on a 2020 stamp of Armenia

Personal information
- Born: 25 January 1910 Bist, Ordubad District, Azerbaijan
- Died: 13 April 1983 (aged 73) Moscow, Russia

Sport
- Sport: Weightlifting
- Club: Dynamo Yerevan
- Coached by: Grigory Simonyan

Sergo Hambardzumyan (or Ambartsumyan, Armenian: Սերգո Համբարձումյան; 25 January 1910 – 13 April 1983) was an Armenian heavyweight weightlifter. He won the Soviet national title in 1933–1935, finishing second in 1940 and third in 1937. Hambardzumyan set a world record in the total in 1938 and placed fifth at the 1946 World Weightlifting Championships.

== Biography ==
Hambardzumyan was born to physically strong parents and weighed 7.2 kg at birth. His mother died when he was 16 years old. In 1930 he moved from his village to the Armenian capital Yerevan to work as a car mechanic; there he took up weightlifting. In 1938 he set a world record at 433.5 kg, but it was not recognized internationally because the Soviet Union was not a member of the International Weightlifting Federation. Nevertheless, Hambardzumyan was awarded the Order of the Badge of Honour and became a protégé of Josif Stalin.

Hambardzumyan placed fifth at the 1946 World Weightlifting Championships, but could not compete in 1947 in Philadelphia because he was not issued an American visa in time. He retired soon after that due to a heart attack, and later took random jobs as a taxi driver and a restaurant owner. He died of a heart failure in Moscow, aged 73.
