= Armen Kouptsios =

Greek revolutionist of the Macedonian Struggle

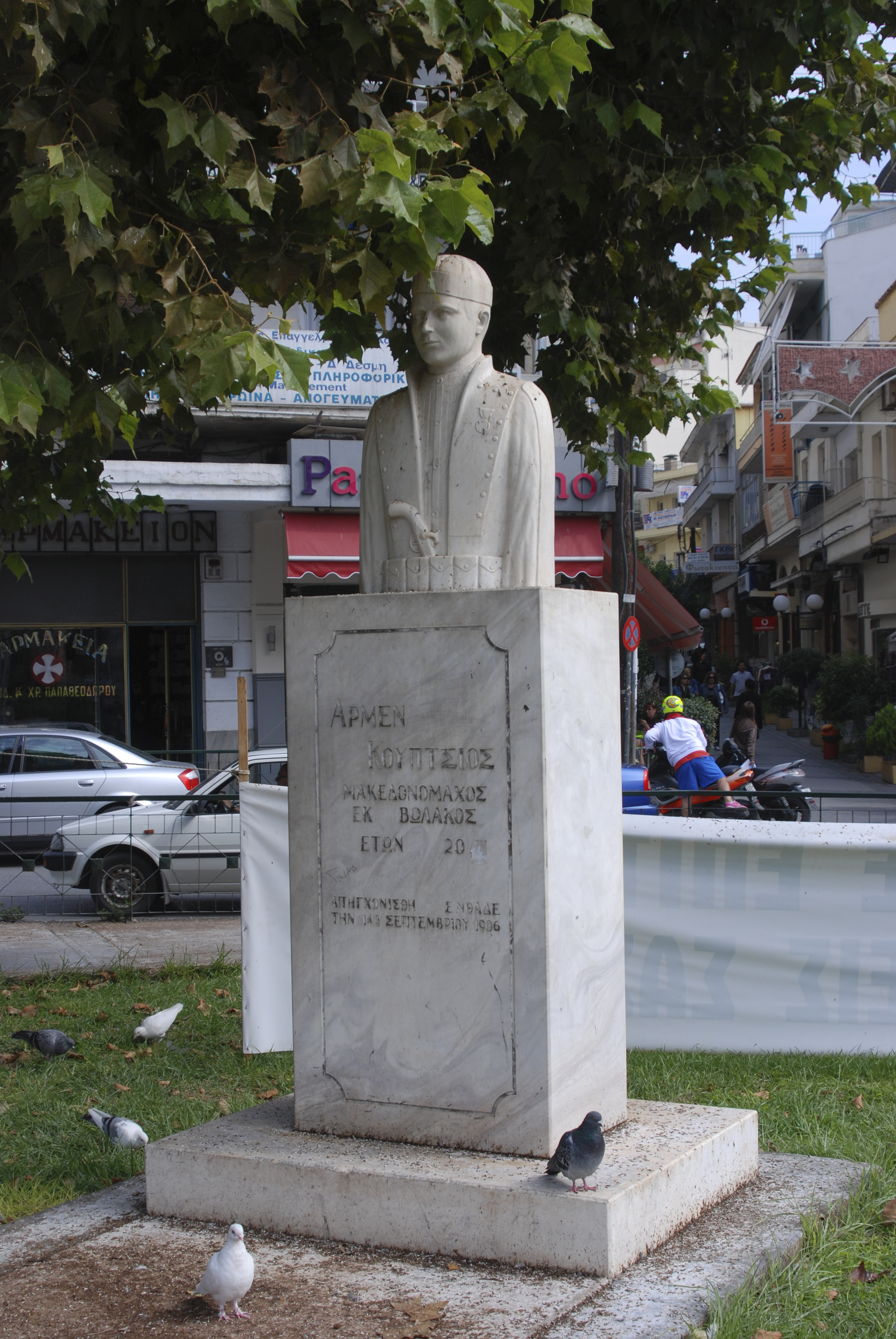
Armen Kouptsios

Armen Kouptsios (Greek: Άρμεν Κούπτσιος, Bulgarian Армен Купциос, 1885 - 1906) was a Macedonian Greek revolutionist.

== Life ==
Kouptsios was born in Volakas in what was then the Ottoman Empire in 1885. He met the Greek Makedonomachos Capitan Dais, who was at that time a teacher in Prosotsani. Captain Dais organized the Macedonian Struggle in Drama. Kouptsios told Dais that he was willing to sacrifice his life for Greece.

The Archdeacon of Bishop of Drama, Chrysostomos, Themistoklis Chatzistavrou (known as Archbishop of Athens and in Greece, Chrysostomos II), in the Macedonian Diary of 1965, writes, "The organization that was initiated by the Greeks was completely secret. We were trying to keep Bishop Chrysostomos away from the danger. We wanted to protect him from the danger that his surging character and his fiery patriotism were leading him. Ion Dragoumis was the general leader of the organization. I was in charge to adjure the initiated members in Drama. I was the one to adjure Armen from Volakas and Valavanis from Petroussa. We were giving them guns."

Armen Kouptsios became one of the most trusted men of Chrysostomos and was incorporated into the revolting troops, which were active in Drama. The revolting troops of Drama fought the Internal Macedonian Revolutionary Organization (IMRO) multiple times and caused them many losses.

Armen Kouptsios' death is connected with the arrival of the IMRO voivod, Plachev, in June 1905. Bulgarian IMRO sent him to organize the murder of Greek leaders and fighters causing problems to the Bulgarian regime. Kouptsios' troops received the command to exterminate Plachev.

Armen Kouptsios with Nakos Vogiatzis and Petros Mantzas upended Plachev in Tsobanka, in Laurentian Abbey in Drama. Plachev was trapped, and Kouptsios asked him to surrender. Plachev fired and Kouptsios retaliated, killing Plachev. By that time, Turkish guards arrived on horseback, under the commands of a caretaker of Kalos Agros. Kouptsios began shooting to give a chance for his companions to escape. Kouptsios chose to be arrested to save his companions. He did not attempt to kill any Turk soldier so as not to cause problems to bishop Chrysostomos. Ottomans at this time would accuse Chrysostomos of every dead Turkish soldier.

Chrysostomos and the people of Drama made several attempts to free Kouptsios, to no avail. Armen Kouptsios was tortured to give the names of the members of the Organization, but he did not reveal anything, so he stood on trial in a special court-martial in Thessaloniki. He was condemned to execution by hanging to take place in Drama.

Chrysostomos and the "Greek center" organized a plan for Armen Kouptsios' escape. Turks learned of the plans, which had to be abandoned. On 14 September 1905, Armen Kouptsios was executed by hanging in the square of Drama.

Armen Kouptsios' father witnessed the scene of his son's execution. Chrysostomos invited Armen's father to the episcopate to comfort him. Armen's father told the bishop "I am not crying for losing my son. I am crying for you because you lost your henchman." In 1916, during World War I, when the Bulgarians returned to Drama, they arrested Armen's father, tortured him, and left him to die inside a well. They also cut the plane tree to leave no memories of the sacrifice to the younger Dramins.

== Legacy ==
Kouptsios is regarded as a folk hero in the Regional Unit of Drama, Greece. A marble bust of him was erected on July 1, 1967, at the Central Square of Drama; the place where he was hanged.
