= Armen A. Harutyunyan =

Armenian economist and politician

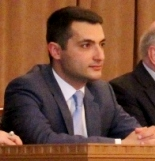

Deputy Minister of Agriculture
- Incumbent
- Assumed office 30 October 2013
- Prime Minister: Karen Karapetyan

Personal details
- Born: 9 September 1981 (age 45) Yerevan, Armenian SSR, Soviet Union
- Education: Armenian National Agrarian University; Texas A&M University; Academy of Public Administration of Armenia; University of Bristol
- Occupation: Deputy Minister of Agriculture of Armenia (2013-2018)
- Profession: Economist

Armen A. Harutyunyan (Armenian: Արմեն Անատոլիի Հարությունյան; born 1981) is an Armenian economist, who served as the Deputy Minister of Agriculture of Armenia in 2013–2018. Additionally, Harutyunyan has been a lecturer at the Agribusiness Educational Center from 2012 to 2014, and at the Yerevan State Medical University since 2018.

Armen Harutyunyan is an expert in behavioral economics and service platform development, currently working on analytics of decentralized payment systems. He served as the deputy minister for six years covering foreign relations, trade and investments. He is invited lecturer of behavioral economics, project management and food economics. Before joining government, he worked as an economist for five years. Armen has strong negotiations and communications skills, which has been mastered through regular interactions with officials, negotiators, investors, businessman and pundits from diverse cultures and backgrounds in more than thirty countries. He was engaged in free trade negotiations with European Union and Eurasian Economic Union.

== Biography and career ==
Armen Harutyunyan was born in 1981 in Yerevan. He holds finance and management degrees from Armenian National Agrarian University and Texas A&M University (1998–2002), the Agribusiness Educational Center, a master's degree in Public Administration from the Academy of Public Administration of Armenia (2006–2009) and a master's degree in International Economic Development from the University of Bristol (2010–2011).

Harutyunyan started his career as an expert at the Agro-Science Department of the Armenian National Agrarian University in 2004. From 2004 to 2005 he continued as an expert of the Marketing Assistance Project (USDA-MAP). In 2005–2010, he was a coordinator of the Akhalkalaki branch of the Georgian agricultural development project (USDA-MAP), and an economist at the Center for Agribusiness and Rural Development Foundation (CARD). In 2011–2012, Harutyunyan was the Project Monitoring and Evaluation Expert at CARD, and in 2012 he became Head of the Marketing and International Relations Department at the Armenian Harvest Promotion Center. From 29 October 2012 onwards, he has been the advisor to the Armenian Minister of Agriculture. On 30 October 2013, he was appointed Deputy Minister of Agriculture of Armenia. Since 2018, august Harutyunyan holds the position of chairman of the Board of Trustees of Armenian National Agrarian University.

== TEDx Yerevan ==
Harutyunyan was a speaker at TEDx Yerevan TEDxSalon event in 2016 themed "Forum Magnum", where he discussed the new prospectives of human capital and its key components, the importance of empowering and encouraging talent, skills, education, innovation, hard work and diligence for nurturing human capital everywhere.

== Awards ==
- The World Bank and Government of Japan Scholarship Program (JJWSP)
- The Prime Minister's Soccer Championship, The Best Defense Player of the Year
- Food & Agriculture Organization of the UN, Medal for Exceptional Partnership
- Government of Armenia, Golden Medal for Exceptional Contribution to Agricultural Development

== Personal life ==
Harutyunyan does not have a partner, and is not a member of a political party.
