= Georgy Martirosyan (serial killer) =

Georgian-born Russian serial killer

- Born: Georgy Tarimanovich Martirosyan; 1969 (age 56–57); Tbilisi, Georgian SSR
- Other names: "Gosha the Magician" "The Magician Killer"
- Conviction: Murder x3
- Penalty: 23 years imprisonment

Details
- Victims: 3–4
- Span of crimes: 2011–2012
- Country: Russia
- State: Moscow
- Date apprehended: February 22, 2012

Georgy Tarimanovich Martirosyan (Russian: Георгий Тариманович Мартиросян; born 1969), known as Gosha the Magician (Russian: Гоша-волшебник), is a Georgian-born Russian serial killer. A magician and self-proclaimed "spiritual healer", he would lure young aspiring models to his Korolyov apartment, where he would drug and cause them to overdose, killing three women, possibly a fourth, between 2011 and 2012. He was convicted of the three murders, and sentenced to 23 years imprisonment.

== Early life ==
Born in Tbilisi to an Armenian family in 1970, Martirosyan's family moved to the European part of the Union when he was two years old. Following the USSR's collapse, he ventured out to search and explore the various countries of the post-Soviet era. In Belarus, he was convicted of theft and served a short prison sentence before moving to Russia. In the late 1990s, he joined a gang of robbers who broke into apartments, but they were eventually captured and imprisoned. Martirosyan was released under amnesty in 2000 in honor of the 55th anniversary of Victory Day. For the following seven years, he worked in a variety of jobs, including a cook, chauffeur, salesman and logger. In 2007, when he made a profile on the popular Russian dating site Mamba.ru, Martirosyan presented himself as a magician and spiritual healer, allegedly capable of curing ailments and healing bad karma, referring to himself as "Gosha the Magician".

Initially, business was relatively slow, but the strange rituals earned him regular clients: using a combination of Wicca and Rasputin-influenced mysticism, he would take girls to an isolated monastery, where he would light candles and sacrifice rams in order to cast spells of good fortune. In 2009, a high-class escort named Rimma became his client, and she enjoyed Gosha's services so much that she told her friends about him. His fame spread through word of mouth, and not long after, he amassed enough wealth to afford a two-storey house in an affluent neighborhood in Korolyov, where he lived with his common-law wife and young daughter, and frequently went on vacations to various countries around the world. According to Martirosyan, among his clients, numbering around 40–50, included "some famous singers" and numerous beauty pageant contestants between the ages of 18 and 50. As a rule of thumb, Gosha turned down all men applying for his services and only accepted women, most of whom were young, rich and gullible, and would even sometimes sleep with them as part of his "rituals".

== Murders ==
=== Modus operandi ===
Despite his lavish lifestyle, Martirosyan's was overcome by greed, and he devised a scheme to earn cash even quicker. This involved befriending a future victim and using his charm to convince them to transfer all of their funds into cash, bag them and go to him, where the two would ostensibly travel to a grandmother living 300 kilometers away from Moscow, with Gosha claiming that they would amass numerous riches via his magical powers. As an initial victim he chose a married businesswoman, named Olga R., but to his surprise, she caught on to his bluff and cut off all contact with him. Realising that he needed to change his plan, Martirosyan dropped the money and grandmother part of his plan, and instead offered to perform the rituals at his client's home.

=== Natalya Trapeznikova ===
For his next victim, he chose 23-year-old Natalya Trapeznikova, a beauty queen and aspiring model from Nizhny Novgorod. Due to an injury she had suffered as a teenager while rowing, Trapeznikova suffered from spinal disc herniation, which caused her pain and discomfort while walking in heels on the catwalk. After being taken in by Martirosyan's claims of spiritual healing several years back, he had managed to convince her to cut off contact with her boyfriend and that a friend from her modeling agency had attempted to poison her. Knowing that she fully believed everything he said, Martirosyan asked Trapeznikova to empty her bank accounts and bring the money to Moscow for a healing session. Against her parents' advice, she complied, withdrawing 1.5 million rubles, and on September 21, 2011, she arrived in Moscow and sat waiting for him at her apartment in the Presnensky District. At some during the night, Martirosyan arrived and entered. When he offered for them to have drinks, he went to the kitchen and got a glass of alcohol, which he laced with a mixture of heroin and methadone. Not long after drinking it, Trapeznikova passed out, and Gosha injected her with a syringe containing more heroin, before disposing of it and giving her another, clean one, in an attempt to simulate an overdose.

However, either by miscalculation or by underestimating the strength of her organism, Trapeznikova survived and was only rendered unconscious. Anxious that his plan was not working as planned, Martirosyan took the woman to the bathroom, where he drowned her. He then poured food for her dog, grabbed the cash lying in the kitchen and some extra jewelry, and promptly left. On the following morning, since their daughter wasn't returning their calls, the Trapeznikovs wrote to Martirosyan through Odnoklassniki and asked him what had happened to Natalya. Martirosyan claimed that he had not seen her in four days, and that he was currently on vacation in Georgia. Alarmed, the couple travelled to Moscow, and upon arrival, they noticed that the light had been left on in the apartment. They contacted the landlady, whom opened the door, and they found her lying dead in the bathtub. They initially suspected that she might have overdosed, but they decided otherwise when they discovered that the syringe she had supposedly used, lacked any fingerprints. It appeared to have been scrubbed precisely, as if somebody had made great effort to erase evidence of another party being present on the day of her death. Despite their suspicions, no criminal investigation was initiated.

=== Maria and Natalya Agarkova ===
Through his contact with models, Martirosyan came across 21-year-old Maria and 38-year-old Natalya Agarkovi, a daughter and mother from Krasnodar. After learning that Maria had dreams of entering the fashion industry and Natalya wanting to work as a fitness instructor and dance show director, and both were significantly wealthy, Gosha volunteered to act as an intermediary and "carry out a ceremony of fortune" for them. He rented a one-room suite in Moscow, and instructed them to come with 5.1 million rubles he knew they had acquired from relatives. On January 14, 2012, the two women entered the rented apartment, but never came out alive. When their bodies were found nearly a week later, the autopsies determined that their blood contained 20 times more heroin than Trapeznikova, which had likely killed them quickly and efficiently.

=== Inna Filippova ===
Aside from the previously mentioned victims, Martirosyan is suspected in the disappearance of Inna Filippova, a 31-year-old businesswoman from Moscow. She too was a long-time client of his, and on December 29, 2011, she was last seen carrying all her savings with her and was en route to Martirosyan's apartment. Her body has never been found.

== Arrest, trial and sentence ==
While examining the Agarkovs' apartment, investigators noticed something peculiar: in the ashtray, next to the light cigarettes that Natalya was known to smoke, they found standard ones with teeth imprints of an unidentified male. After investigating their friends and their phones' call histories, they were eventually led to Martirosyan. Coincidentally, he smoked these types of cigarettes, which were also found in Trapeznikova's ashtray, and he had been questioned in the former's death but released due to lack of evidence. On February 22, Gosha was arrested and his house searched, with the authorities locating as many as 6.6 kilograms of heroin on the premises.

During the official interrogation, Martirosyan admitted to being in Trapeznikova's apartment, but claimed that he and the drunk Natalya had sniffed cocaine and then had oral sex, before she undressed and went to shower in the bathroom. Feeling "disgusted" by the ordeal, he packed his stuff and left, taking with him an expensive bottle of whisky imported from Paris. At the initial questioning, the police had failed to check the security footage, which clearly showed Gosha leaving the apartment, carrying with him some kind of heavy package. Despite these initial failures, investigators had enough evidence to charge him with the murders, as the heroin found in his home, as well as decorations and cards belonging to the Agarkovs, were considered hard evidence.

At his trial, Martirosyan vehemently denied his guilt, and often insulted everybody present in the courtroom, including the judge himself. When interviewed by the press, he claimed that the deaths were accidental overdoses, and that he should be acquitted. As for the interrogations, he claimed that he had been tortured by the police, who had electrocuted him and hadn't allowed him to eat for two days, and additionally alleged that they had planted the drugs in his home. On April 22, 2014, the Moscow City Court found Martirosyan guilty of the three murders, robbery and drug trafficking, and sentenced him to 23 years imprisonment, in addition to paying 23 million rubles in damages to the victims' families. At a later date, his defense managed to lower his sentence by a month. He was sent off to a special regime colony, where he remains to this very day.

== See also ==
- List of Russian serial killers
