= Krematorij =

Russian rock band

Krematorij (Крематорий)
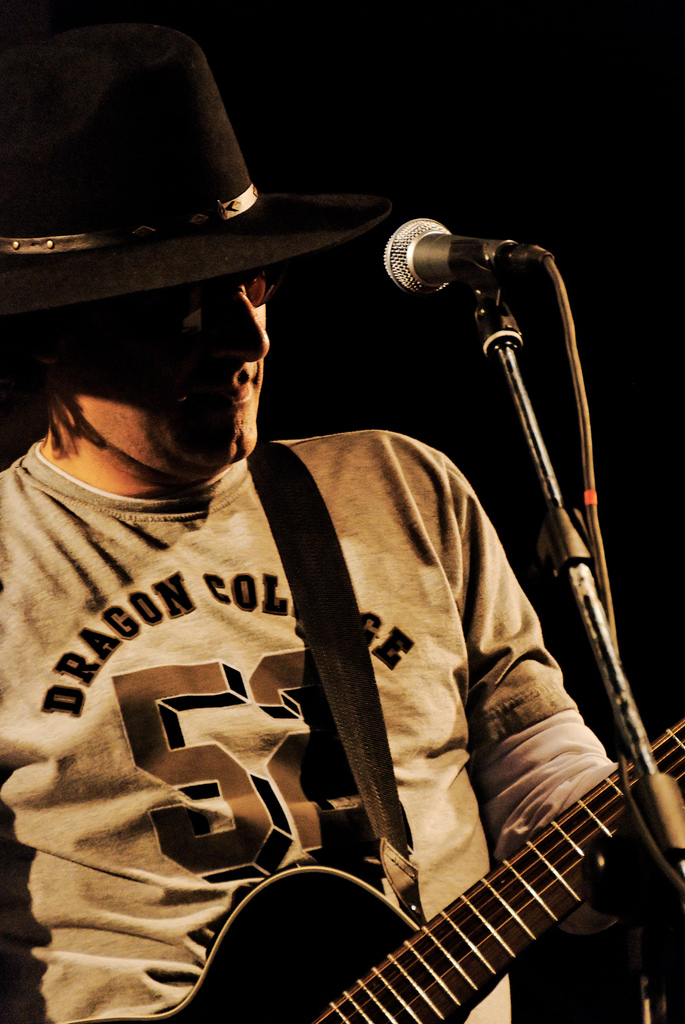
- Armen Grigoryan at concert

Background information
- Origin: Moscow, Russia
- Genres: Blues rock, hard rock, rock and roll
- Years active: 1983–present
- Labels: Melodia, Moroz, Soyuz
- Members: Armen Grigoryan (vocal, guitar), Maksim Guselshchikov (violin, keyboards), Andrey Yermola (drums), Vladimir Kulikov (guitar), Nikolay Korshunov (bass)
- Website: crematorium.ru

Krematorij (Russian: Крематорий, lit. 'Crematorium') is a Russian rock band. The band is considered one of the best concert performing teams in Russia, known for its masterly rock-n-roll. Formed in Moscow in 1983, Krematorij gained quick recognition, achieved the status of a legend of Russian Rock-n-Roll and after 30 years on stage continues to delight its audiences throughout the former Soviet Union, the Netherlands, Germany, Israel and the United States. The group's frontman (and main songwriter) is Armen Grigoryan.

== History ==
The group was formed by Armen Grigoryan and Viktor Troyegubov in 1983 when rock music in the USSR was censored and banned. After running through several names including "The Lady Killers" and "Black Sunday," the group finally decided on "Crematorium." They started playing at musical events called "kvartirniki", underground acoustic concerts held at private apartments. The group quickly grew in popularity in Moscow rock circles. The group was unique in its inclusion of violin as a lead instrument, on the same level as lead guitar, giving it a peculiar colorful sound. After the release of Illusionary World in 1985, the group gained a reputation throughout the Soviet Union and began to perform at concerts all over the country. In 1986, Krematorij joined the Moscow Rock Laboratory. However, Troyegubov left the group due to discord with Grigoryan and formed a new project called Smoke. Krematorij continued to increase in popularity until several group members left again after the release of Coma in 1988. Coma became the fourth studio album by Krematorij. It was recorded at the Gorky Film Studio with producer Nikolay Shestov, and was awarded by the 1st diploma of "Avrora" magazine. Coma is considered the band's strongest effort of the period, and remains one of the most influential albums of the Soviet rock music. Grigoryan succeeded in drawing new musicians to the band although since 1980's the group sometimes plays with a 'reduced' (acoustic) lineup, including Armen Grigoryan, the violinist and the guitarist. The band has changed with times, "emerging in the words of Rodion Schedrin, as the original "Waltz-Rock" band, much different from its underground beginnings, but always true to its passion to create original music. The band's current repertoire covers a wide range of styles".

Uniqueness of Krematorij is also in their improvisational style. According to critics, "instead of boringly regurgitating the same old program at every performance", the group uses "a solid music base to recreate every performance anew, adding slight nuances, visualization effects and just plain Crem magic, which can only be felt at a live concert".

The first conceptual album of the group, Zombi, was written towards the end of 1990, and, released in 1991. It was considered by Zvuki.ru as an album "inhabited by certain strange and wondrous creatures, some "terrible bacchae," and other Tolkienian organisms barely recognizable in the dark".

Troyegubov temporarily returned to the group in 1993 as both a musician and the director of the group. After another quarrel, Troyegubov left the group for a second and final time. He later wrote a book entitled Life in Krematorij and Outside It in which he makes many accusations against Grigoryan. He returned to Smoke which quickly dissipated.

Meanwhile, Krematorij continued its creative life, releasing several more albums and performing on tours all over the world. Krematorij contributed greatly to the development of the Russian rock music genre. The group continues to delight its audiences throughout the former Soviet Union, the Netherlands, Germany, Israel and the United States.

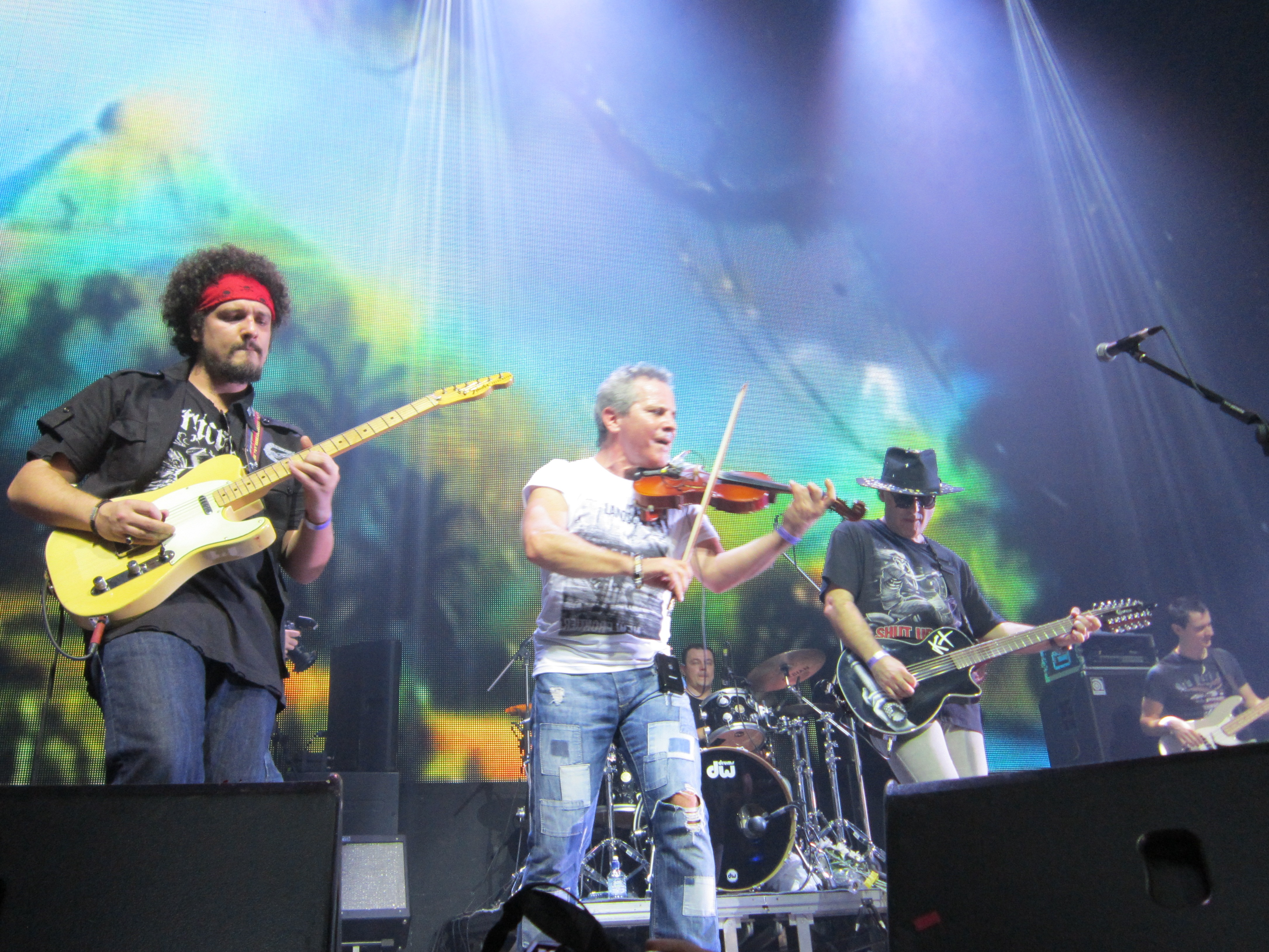
Krematorij in 2013

In 2000 Krematorij released an album entitled "Three Sources" a name that was taken from the Apocalypse, from the chapter about the three spirits summoned to take part in the great battle during Armageddon. "For an epigram to the album I would include a quote from the song "Zveroyascher," which would be studying humans and animals, and everything that comes between them....", said Armen Grigoryan.

In 2001 guitarist Dmitry Terentyev become Andrey Murashov's successor. Terentyev's arrival revitalised the band creatively, and in 2002 a new album titled "Mithology" was released by Soyuz Records, showing a wide variety of musical styles.

Krematorij celebrated its 20th anniversary by playing a number of shows in Russia and abroad. A new DVD containing footage of a show performed in the Gorbunov Palace of Culture was released in 2004. Krematorij toured in USA, Europe and Israel, performing their hits "Tanya", "Kondrati", "Trash Wind", "Ugly Elsa", "Saxy Cat", "Strawberry with Ice", "Little Girl", "Katmandu" and many others.

In 2006 Armen Grigoryan starts new project 3' Angel and releases album Chinese Tank. He became the only artist in the history of Nashestvie festival, who performed at the festival with two groups, Krematorij and 3' Angel.

In 2008 Krematorij's album Amsterdam was awarded by the "Golden Disk" of All-Russian Association of the Phonographic Industry. The tour in support of the album, called A Tour to the Amsterdam, started in the spring of 2008. Their song "Amsterdam" headed the Top 13 of Russian Nashe Radio for several weeks. The same done "Chemodan Prezidenta" in 2013. According to the critics, with a new line-up, Krematorij "remains one of the most authentic rock bands of the Russian music scene".

The next album Hunter was recognized as one of the best rock albums of 2021 by the "Reproductor" Russian portal and one of the best albums of 2021 according to an open vote on the Musecube.org portal.

In June 2023 the group released a collection of their best songs translated into different languages "The Big One".

== Discography ==
Over the years, Crematorium has released 15 albums of original songs, 8 compilations, 2 discs of historic musical recordings and numerous live concert CDs and DVDs.

- 1983 – Винные мемуары / Vinnie Memuary/ Wine Memoirs
- 1984 – Крематорий / Krematoriy / Crematorium
- 1985 – Иллюзорный мир / Illyuzorniy Mir / Illusory World
- 1988 – Кома / Coma
- 1989 – Клубника со льдом / Klubnika So L'dom / Strawberries on Ice
- 1991 – Зомби / Zombie
- 1994 – Танго на облаке / Tango Na Oblake/ Tango on the Cloud
- 1995 – Текиловые сны / Tekilovie Sny / Tequila Dreams
- 1996 – Гигантомания / Gigantomania
- 1996 – Микронезия / Micronesia
- 1997 – Ботаника / Botanika / Botany
- 2000 – Три источника / Tri Istochnika / Three Springs
- 2001 – Реквием для всадника без головы / Rekviem Dlya Vsadnika Bez Golovy / Requiem for the Headless Horseman
- 2002 – Мифология / Mythology
- 2003 – Рок`Н`Ролл / Rock'n'Roll
- 2008 – Амстердам / Amsterdam
- 2009 – XXV Лет — The Best / XXV Let / 25 Years
- 2013 – Чемодан президента / Chemodan Prezidenta / President's Suitcase
- 2016 – Люди-невидимки / Lyudi-nevidimki / Invisible People
- 2021 – Охотник / Okhotnik / The Hunter
- 2023 – The Big One

== See also ==
- Rock music in Russia
