= Armen Grigoryan (duduk player) =

- Born: May 19, 1971 (age 54); Yerevan, Armenia
- Origin: Armenia
- Instruments: duduk, zurna, shvi, pku
- Years active: 1990–present
- Website: Armen Grigoryan Professional Duduk player

Armen Vaghinaki Grigoryan (Armenian: Արմեն Վաղինակի Գրիգորյան, Armenian pronunciation: [arˈmen ɡriɡorˈjan]; born May 19, 1971) is an Armenian musician, professional duduk player.

== Biography ==
Born in Yerevan, in a family of musician.

In 1985 entered the class of duduk and shvi in a musical school named after Armen Tigranyan, (prof. N. Jamharyan) and in two years graduated excellently five years course. During this period participated in many concepts, he was presented by a golden medal in the international contest of duduk players. In 1988 entered Yerevan State Conservatory named after Komitas, studied there and took his lessons in Jivan Gasparyan's class.

== Musical activity ==
Studying in the conservatory he taught in the musical school named after M. Mirzayan, since 1990 worked and taught in another musical school Armen Tigranyan by name up to 1992. Since 1989 worked in the instrumental orchestra of dance ensemble Krunk.(director - national artist Azat Gharibyan, later T. Grigoryan). Since 1992 worked in the TV and RADIO folk orchestra named after Aram Merangulyan. In 1993 graduated from the Conservatory and worked there as a teacher of duduk up to 1995. In 1997 founded an ensemble with famous singer Papin Poghosyan. In this new Ensemble named “Veratsnund”, Armen was a duduk player as well as a director of an orchestra up to 2000. Armen now teaches many students to play duduk. Traveled and gave many concerts in the USA (1988, 1995, 2005, 2006), France (1991-1992), Australia (1995), United Arab Emirates (1997, 2004), Lebanon (1996, 2000), Syria (1989, 2005), Spain (1998), Netherlands (2003), Poland and Germany (2004).

Has cooperated with famous singers for years. Many of his recordings are kept in Radio foundation. He has recorded three CDs which are popular in many countries. The fourth CD is prepared to be issued in one of US's best studios. Armen is the soloist and concertmaiser of duduk-players in Orchestra of Folk Instruments of Armenia (dirijor professor Norayr Davtyan) since the day of its foundation.

Founded a quartet of duduk players in 2005, they perform various genre compositions.

Member of IOV (UNESCO) since 2006.

In 2011 the president of Armenia indued him a title of Honored Artist of Armenia.

== Discography ==
- The Sound of Armenia
- Komitas (Apricot Tree)
