= Armen Martirosyan =

Armen Martirosyan may refer to:

- Armen Martirosyan (athlete) (born 1969), Armenian triple jumper
- Armen Martirosyan (Heritage party politician), Armenian politician
- Armen Martirosyan (diplomat), Armenian politician and ambassador to India for Armenia
- Armen Martirosyan (musician) (born 1963), artistic director and conductor of the Armenian Jazz Band
