= Armen Hambardzumyan =

Armenian actor and producer (born 1958)

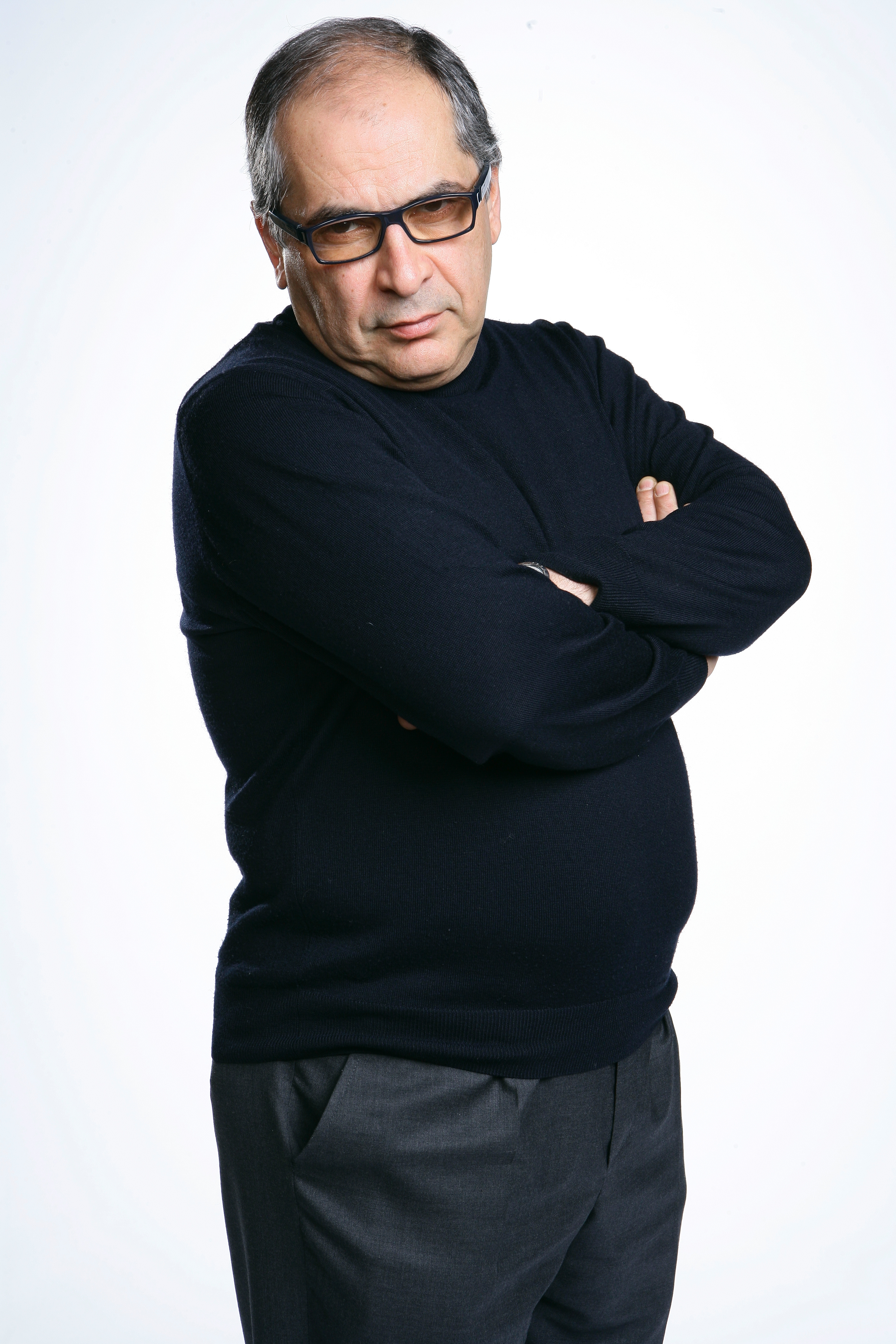
- Born: Hambardzumyan Armen Levon; 10 August 1958 (age 67); Yerevan, Armenia
- Occupation: producer

Armen Levoni Hambardzumyan (Armenian: Արմեն Լևոնի Համբարձումյան; born 10 August 1958) is an Armenian actor and producer. Hambardzumyan was awarded the Golden Medal of the Ministry of Culture of the RA as well as the Certificate of the Ministry of Defense of the RA.

== Life ==
Armen Hambardzumyan was born on 18 August 1958 (10 August on passport) in Yerevan. From 1965 to 1975, Hambardzumyan studied in number 55 school after Chekhov and then in number 20 school after Dzerzhinsky. From 1975 to 1978, Hambardzumyan worked as electrician at the Yerevan City Telephone Net. From 1979 to 1989 participated in the founding, establishing and creative development of the Chamber Theater of Yerevan acting as an actor, director and administrator.

Played the following lead roles in the Chamber Theater; Hamlet (Hamlet by W. Shakespeare), Claude Eatherly (Claude by P. Zeytuntsyan), Slave (Theater of Nero's and Seneca's period by Edvard Radzinsky) as well as he acted in almost all plays based on A. Yernjakyan's works staged in the Chamber Theater. From 1992 to 1995 Armen Hambardzumyan was financial Director of Goyak commercial art-trade association. In those years took part in the founding and establishing of Goyak experimental theater-laboratory. In the meantime he organized post-modern Armenian painters' exhibitions in Yugoslavia, Russia and Czechoslovakia. From 1995 until present Armen Hambardzumyan is engaged in producing activities.

== Career ==
Works and Tours

Year	Place	Event
1996	Yerevan Armenia	Khatabalada play, Author of idea, producer
1997	Los Angeles-Glendale, USA	Khatabalada tours, producer
1998	Yerevan, Armenia	Yerevan-Blues motion picture Author of idea, producer
1999	Los Angeles-Glendale, USA	Yerevan-Blues Motion picture Screening, producer
1999	Paris France	Yerevan-Blues Motion picture Screening, producer
1999	Moscow Russia	Yerevan-Blues Motion picture Screening, producer
2000	Hanover Germany	Organization of Days of Armenia Expo-2000 International Festival, author of idea, producer
2000–2006	Yerevan, Armenia	Mer Aybbenaran (Our Alphabet)Feature Movie for children, author of idea, producer
2001	Yerevan, Armenia	Events dedicated to the 1700th anniversary of adoption of Christianity in Armenia, producer
2001-today	Yerevan, Armenia	PR Manager at the Moscow Cinema
2002	Yerevan, Armenia	Mea Culpa play Author of idea, producer
2004-today	Los Angeles-Glendale, USA	All Armenian Fund Annual Tele-Marathon, producer
2004	Los Angeles, USA	Mea Culpa tours, producer
2004	Washington, USA	Mea Culpa tours, producer
2004	New York City	Mea Culpa tours, producer
2005.12	Yerevan, Armenia	Mer Bak (Our yard) 3 movie, producer
2006	Moscow, Russia	Mea Culpa tours, producer
2007.01.28	Yerevan, Armenia	Concert dedicated to the 15th anniversary of the Armenian Army, producer
2007.04.06	Yerevan, Armenia	Songs of Special Purpose Project dedicated to the 15th anniversary of the Armenian Army, producer
2007.05.08	Yerevan, Armenia	Concert dedicated to the 15th anniversary of liberation of Shushi, producer
2007.05.09	Yerevan, Armenia	Yerevan-Moscow Transit. Concert dedicated to Victory Day and the 15th anniversary of the liberation of Shushi, producer
2007.10.11	Yerevan, Armenia	Concert Day of the City dedicated to the 2789th anniversary of Yerevan, producer
2007.10.30	Yerevan, Armenia	Armenian Electric Networks CJSC 5th anniversary, producer
2008	Yerevan, Armenia	I Love You Project dedicated to the Holiday of St. Sargis, producer
2008.01.10	Yerevan, Armenia	50th anniversary of Hrant Tokhatyan, producer
2008.01.27	Yerevan, Armenia	"Military Ball" dedicated to the 16th anniversary of the Armenian Army, producer
2008.01.28	Yerevan, Armenia	Concert dedicated to the 16th anniversary of the Armenian Army, producer
2008.02.03	Yerevan, Armenia	Alla Levonyan solo concert, producer
2008.02.08	Yerevan, Armenia	Aramo and Emma Petrosyan's solo concert, producer
2008.04.09	Yerevan, Armenia	Inauguration of the President of the RA Serzh Sargsyan, producer
2008.10.31	Yerevan, Armenia	Show on Ice Project, on the occasion of opening of SCC, producer
2008	Yerevan, Armenia	Opera-opera play dedicated to the 100th anniversary of William Saroyan by order of the Ministry of Culture of the RA, producer
2009.03.05	Yerevan, Armenia	Taxi Eli Lav a motion picture producer
2009	Yerevan, Armenia	Zhangot Banali play, author of idea, producer
2009	Yerevan, Armenia	Don Juan Avia play, producer
2009.10.12	Yerevan, Armenia	Concert Day of the City dedicated to the 2791st anniversary of Yerevan, producer
2010.01.28	Yerevan, Armenia	Concert dedicated to the 18th anniversary of the Armenian Army, producer
2010.10.11	Yerevan, Armenia	Concert dedicated to the 20th anniversary of the Republican Party, producer
2010.12.10	Yerevan, Armenia	A Millionaire Wanted motion picture, producer
2011	Los Angeles-Glendale, USA	Don Juan Avia tours, producer
2011	San Francisco, USA	Don Juan Avia tours, producer
2011	Fresno, USA	Don Juan Avia tours, producer
2011.10.25	Yerevan, Armenia	Groom from the Circus motion picture, producer
2012	Yerevan, Armenia	20 Years Together Documentary dedicated to the 20th anniversary of All Armenian Fund, producer
2012.10.04	Yerevan, Armenia	Poker.am motion picture, producer
2012.10.25	Tbilisi, Georgia	Poker with the rules of love motion picture, producer
2012	Yerevan, Armenia	Shushan Petrosyan solo concert
2012	NKR, Stepanakert	Concert dedicated to the 20th anniversary of the Army of NKR and liberation of Shushi, 9 May Victory Day, producer
2012	Yerevan, Armenia	Anush opera, in partnership with French theater Nanterre, producer
2013	Yerevan, Armenia	Don Juans in Marseille play, producer
2013	Yerevan, Armenia	Move with Knight motion picture, producer
2013	Los Angeles, Glendale, Fresno, San Francisco	Don Juans in Marseille, tours, producer
2013.10.11,12	Yerevan, Armenia	City Day concert dedicated to the 2795th anniversary of Yerevan, producer
2013	Yerevan, Armenia	Siro Kamurj musical, producer
2014.10.11,12	Yerevan, Armenia	City Day concert dedicated to the 2796th anniversary of Yerevan, producer
2014	Los Angeles-Glendale, USA	All Armenian Fund Annual Tele-Marathon, producer
2015	Paris, Lyon, Switzerland, Belgium, Brussels	Don Juans Avia, tours, producer
2015	Paris, Yerevan	Like an American Song motion picture, producer
