= Human Rights Tulip =

Human Rights Tulip Mensenrechtentulp
- Country: Netherlands
- Presented by: Dutch ministry of Foreign Affairs
- First award: 2008
- Website: www.humanrightstulip.nl

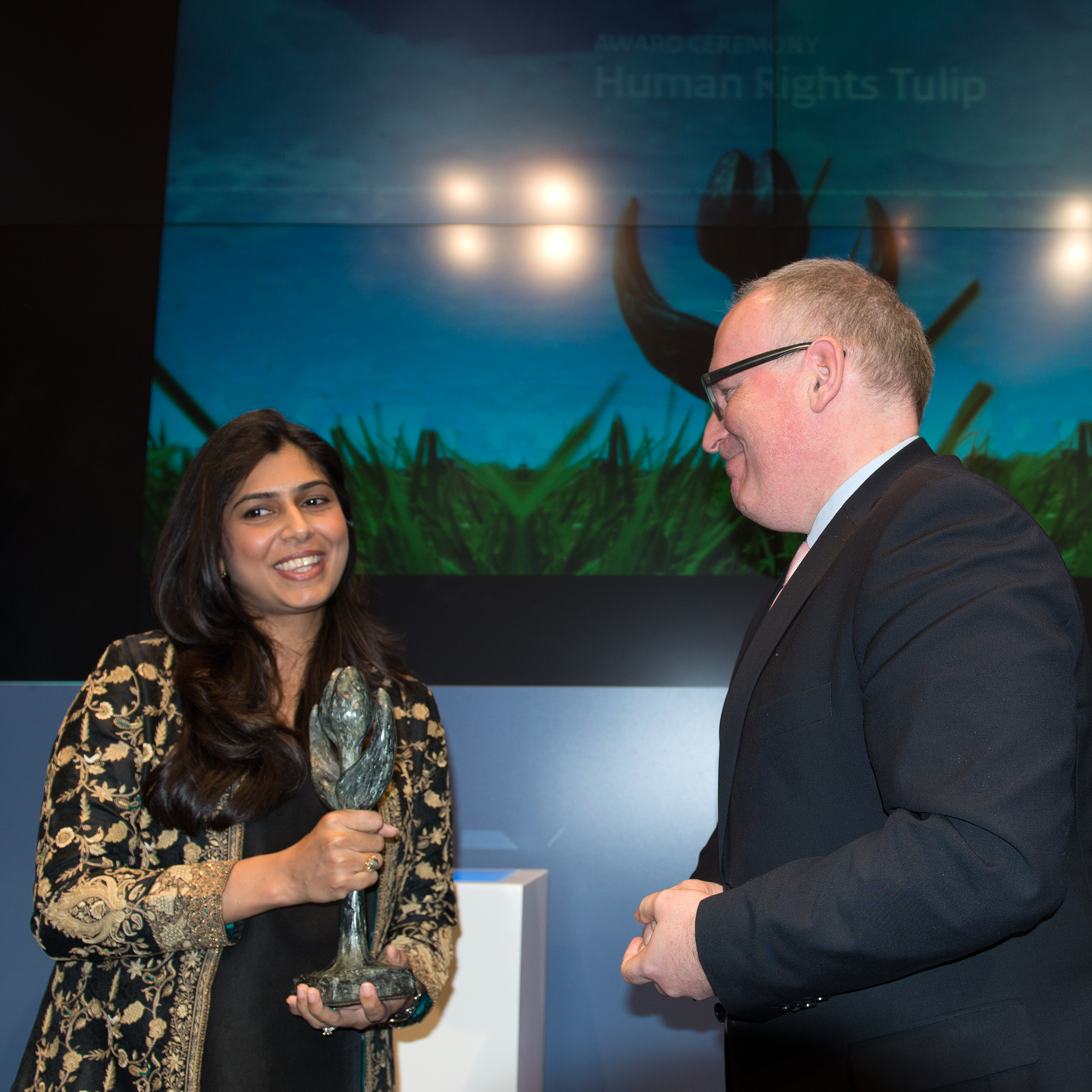
Sheena Hadi of Aahung with Human Rights Tulip. On the right: Frans Timmermans (2013)

The Human Rights Tulip (Dutch: Mensenrechtentulp) is an annual prize awarded by the Dutch ministry of Foreign Affairs to a human rights defender or organisation who promotes and supports human rights in innovative ways. The Human Rights Tulip was established in 2007 and presented for the first time on 10 December 2008 and designed by the artist duo Adelheid and Huub Kortekaas.

The prize consists of a statuette and support worth €100.000 to assist the winning individual or organization to further develop and scale up their innovation.

The procedure of awarding the Human Rights Tulip starts with an open nominating procedure. The winner is selected by the Dutch minister of Foreign Affairs on the basis of public voting and the advice of an independent jury.

In October 2013, The Netherlands Foreign Minister Frans Timmermans decided to retain the award but to seek greater awareness for it.

In June 2014, the foreign ministry appointed the international development organisation Hivos to run the selection process for the award. This partnership continued in 2015, when the shortlist of six candidates was composed of three gaining the most votes in a public voting process, and three more selected by the Foreign Ministry and Hivos.

== Award winners ==
Year	Image	Recipient	Nationality or Base Country	Notes
2008		Justine Masika Bihamba	Democratic Republic of the Congo	Her organisation, Women's Synergy for the Victims of Sexual Violence (Synergie des femmes pour les Victimes des violences Sexuelles – SFVS) has since 2002 been fighting the massive use of sexual violence in the armed conflict in the east of the DRC.
2009		Shadi Sadr	Iran	A women's rights activist and campaigner against stoning as an execution method.
2010		Bertha Oliva	Honduras	For her long struggle for the rights of relatives of people who were disappeared in Honduras between 1979 and 1989.
2011		Ni Yulan	China	A human rights lawyer from China.
2012		Marimuthu Bharathan	India	A Dalit human rights defender from India, although he could not receive the award in person due to his being denied a passport by the Government of India.
2013		Aahung	Pakistan	A human rights organization from Pakistan working to further sexual and reproductive health and rights.
2014		Mideast Youth	N/A (Middle East)	Creator of online platforms for discussion of human rights issues in parts of the Middle East. The award was presented to Esra'a Al Shafei, the organisation's founder and director.
2015		IRA-Mauritania	Mauritania	An organisation challenging slavery in Mauritania.
2016		Nighat Dad	Pakistan	A Pakistani activist who supports the right of women to access the internet and use it free of harassment.
2017		Graciela Pérez Rodriguez	Mexico	A Mexican human rights activist, who defends the rights of family members of disappeared persons in Mexico.
2018		Zeid Ra'ad Al Hussein	Jordan	United Nations High Commissioner for Human Rights
2020		Lilit Martirosyan	Armenia	Transgender activist and founder of Right Side NGO (Իրավունքի Կողմ)
2021		Flavie Villanueva	Philippines	Roman Catholic priest who ran the Church-base Project Paghilom as a support to the relatives of victims of extrajudicial killings linked to the Philippine drug war.
2021		Nicholas Opiyo	Uganda	Human rights lawyer for his work against the anti-gay law in his country and the criminalising of torture.

== Nominees ==
=== 2014 ===
In 2014, 30 candidates have been nominated for the prize: Ladislaus Kiiza Rwakafuuzi, Elena Klimova, Audrey Mbugua, Meng Lin, Mideast Youth platform, Chidi Odinkalu, Sahil, Sima Samar, SHEILD, Terre des hommes, Under The Same Sun, WADI, YASunidos, Leyla Yunus, Margarita Zamora Tobar, Abounaddara, ASL19, CADHAC, Cairo Institute for Human Rights Studies, Centre for Civil Society and Democracy in Syria, Colectiva Feminista para el Desarallo Local, Committee Against Torture, Mazen Darwish, Droit et Justice, Euromaidan SOS, Foro de Jovenes con Liderazgo, Hasht-e Subh, International Campaign for Human Rights in Iran, Rasul Jafarov, and Jan Sahas.

=== 2020 ===
In 2020, 13 candidates were nominated for the prize: Lilit Martirosyan (Europe), The Belarus Helsinki Committee (Europe), Human Rights Centre ZMINA (Europe), Victor Domingo Zambrano Gonzales (Latin America), Georgina Orellano (Latin America), Carlos Fernando Charmorro Barrios (Latin America), Francisco José de Roux Rengifo (Latin America), zk´at Red de Sanadoras del Feminismo Comunitario Territorial (Latin America), Parveena Ahangar (Asia), Quanzhang Wang and Wenzu Li (Asia), the Egyptian Commission for Rights and Freedoms (Middle East and North Africa), the Palestinian Working Woman Society for Development (Middle East and North Africa), and the Sudanese Professionals Association (Sub-Saharan Africa).
