= Majal =

Majal may refer to:

- Majal (organization), a non-profit organisation in the Middle East
- Majal, Barmer, a settlement in Rajasthan, India
