= Neha Mankani =

Pakistani midwife

Neha Mankani (Urdu: نیہا منکانی) is a Pakistani midwife and a member of the 2023 BBC 100 Women. In addition to promoting the importance of midwives, and raising funds for patient care, she has also worked to draw attention to the impacts of climate change on midwifery, and healthcare more broadly.

== Education ==
Mankani grew up in a family who supported her pursuit of education. She obtained her bachelor's degree in Social Sciences from the Lahore University of Management Sciences. She then attended school in the United States as a Fulbright Scholar, where she earned a master's degree in public health from Columbia University. She also participated in the ICM Young Leaders Programme.

== Career ==
While pursuing her master's degree, Mankani worked for a summer in a Ugandan refugee camp. After graduating with her master's, Mankani joined the Lady Dufferin Hospital's midwifery program. She began collecting a small fund among her friends and family to help financially support patients.

Mankani began running maternal health clinics for underserved communities in Pakistan in 2015. Aahung

In 2019, Mankani established the Mama Baby Fund charity in Karachi to provide financial support to families who couldn't afford pre-natal, post-natal, and infant healthcare.

In 2020, Mankani began traveling to Baba Island, off the coastline of Karachi, to provide patient care. In addition to midwifery, Mankani has also served the community by providing other patient care and putting together disaster response plans.

As of 2021, Mankani was working for Indus Hospital and Health Network (IHHN) to set up and manage midwife programs in primary care settings.

In 2022, Mankani was part of a group of midwives who provided care in Sindh Province in the midst of flooding there. As part of this work, she visited flood-affected areas and internally displaced persons camps to deliver supplies for delivering babies. She also conducted maternal health clinics. She was interviewed on her work for the BBC's Woman's Hour, and a short documentary was later made about her efforts. She was interviewed by the BBC a second time in December 2022, where she discussed the impacts of malnutrition on Pakistani women.

Mankani serves as Humanitarian Engagement and Climate Advisor at the International Confederation of Midwives. International Confederation of Midwives, Women in Global Health, the PUSH Campaign's regional coordinator for South Asia, In March 2024, Mankani traveled to the United States to speak at Direct Relief's International Women’s Day celebration in Goleta, California.

== Recognition ==
In 2021, Mankani was one of seven women healthcare workers to win the Beyond Applause: Heroines of Health 2021 Award, given by Women in Global Health.

In March 2023, Mankani was named the U.S. Mission Pakistan's 2023 Woman of Courage. In November 2023, Mankani was named to the BBC's 100 Women list.

In October 2025, Mankani was named to Time magazine's TIME100 Climate list of the 100 most influential climate leaders of 2025.

== Publications ==
- Mir, Ali; Shaikh, Gul; Shaikh, Saleem; Mankani, Neha; Hassan, Anushe; Sadiq, Maqsood (2013). Assessing retention and motivation of public health-care providers (particularly female providers) in rural Pakistan (Report). Population Council. doi:10.31899/rh3.1004.
- Mir, Ali Mohammad; Shaikh, Muhammad Saleem; Rashida, Gul; Mankani, Neha (December 2015). "To serve or to leave: a question faced by public sector healthcare providers in Pakistan". Health Research Policy and Systems. 13 (S1): 58. doi:10.1186/s12961-015-0045-4. ISSN 1478-4505. PMC 4895244. PMID 26790926.
- Jahangir, Aminah; Mankani, Neha. Aahung - Empowering Adolescents in Pakistan through Life Skills-based Education (PDF) (Report). United Nations Girls' Education Initiative.
- Smith, Janel R.; Ho, Lara S.; Langston, Anne; Mankani, Neha; Shivshanker, Anjuli; Perera, Dhammika (2013). "Clinical care for sexual assault survivors multimedia training: A mixed-methods study of effect on healthcare providers' attitudes, knowledge, confidence, and practice in humanitarian settings". Conflict and Health. 7 (1): 14. doi:10.1186/1752-1505-7-14. PMC 3708794. PMID 23819561.
