= Marimuthu Bharathan =

Indian activist

Marimuthu Bharathan (born 9 January 1961) is an Indian activist advocating for Dalit rights. In 2012, he was honoured with the Human Rights Tulip award by the Dutch government. However, he was denied a passport to travel abroad and receive the award in person, owing to a pending murder charge, which he strongly denied.

== Social position ==
Dalits, often referred to as "untouchables", fall outside the Hindu caste system and are widely regarded in India as being of inferior social status. As a result, they frequently face denial of their basic human rights. There are approximately 260 million Dalits worldwide, with the majority residing in India.

Bharathan has spoken to the Dutch press about his experiences as a Dalit. "I have experienced the pain of untouchability from my youth. As a student, I was beaten because I wore shoes while walking through a higher-caste neighbourhood. In 2009, enraged caste Hindus tried to kill me," he recalled.

Bharathan describes the Dalits in India as being akin to slaves, deprived of land, money, and rights, and largely excluded from the benefits of India's economic growth. "Only a very small number of educated Dalits manage to secure a position in modern Indian society," he has said.

== Career ==
Bharathan serves as the director of the Human Rights Education and Protection Council, locally known as KALAM, based in Tirunelveli, Tamil Nadu. This organisation, which has been active for over thirty years, works towards the welfare of Dalits and actively addresses caste discrimination and human rights violations. It provides training, legal support, and assistance to self-help organisations for Dalits, including those led by Dalit women.

KALAM’s initiatives for children from the Dalit community across 51 villages in the Tirunelveli district have been well-documented. The organisation has improved school enrolment rates, ensured better immunisation coverage, facilitated birth registrations, and established children’s groups and centres. Additionally, it has successfully eradicated manual scavenging in several villages.

Bharathan is a veteran campaigner against caste discrimination in temples, schools, and even teahouses. He has documented over 450 cases of such discrimination in the Tirunelveli and Tuticorin districts. He has stated, "The country has several laws to protect human rights, but they are not implemented in letter and spirit."

Bharathan has actively worked towards securing compensation and rehabilitation for Dalits who have faced human rights violations. Additionally, he has organised campaigns to address and combat police corruption.

== 2009 murder charge ==
On 27 May 2009, Bharathan was arrested and taken to the Suthamalli police station. Although his name was not mentioned in the initial reports of the case, he was later charged with the 11 January 2009 murder of three caste Hindus: K. Madhan of Suthamalli, and S. Ayyappan and N. Ayyappan. He became the 25th accused person in the case.

Following a court hearing on 3 June, he was granted bail and released on 27 June. A subsequent hearing was scheduled for 25 August 2009. However, as Bharathan was unable to attend, he filed a petition, and the hearing was rescheduled to a later date.

In January 2013, Bharathan stated that he had never met the other 24 accused in the case and that the trial had yet to commence.

=== Denial of charges ===
Bharathan, along with several human rights groups, denied the charges and questioned the motivations behind them. Bharathan stated, "I’m facing all these problems only because I am a Dalit activist."

Indian human rights organisations have strongly refuted the allegations, with one describing them as "judicial harassment." It has been alleged that the murder accusation was obtained under duress from one of a group of jailed Dalit suspects whom Bharathan had been supporting in a separate case in 2009.

== Recognition in the Netherlands ==
=== 2012 Human Rights Tulip award ===
In December 2012, Bharathan was announced as the winner of the annual Dutch Human Rights Tulip award. In an email to Bharathan, Gerard Oonk, the director of the India Committee of The Netherlands, stated that the independent award jury in the Netherlands had recognised him as a "tireless champion of better living and working conditions for his country’s Dalits."

However, on 18 December, the passport office in Madurai, acting on advice from the Palayamkottai police station, refused to renew Bharathan’s passport, thereby preventing him from travelling to the Netherlands for the award ceremony in The Hague on 9 January 2013. The police cited the pending triple murder case from 2009 as the reason for denying him a passport.

The award, worth 100,000 euros, was presented in absentia by Dutch Foreign Minister Frans Timmermans after a message from Bharathan was read out. In his message, Bharathan stated that India, a signatory to the Human Rights Defenders Protection Treaty, "should not have let him down" by preventing his travel. He added that his attendance "would have been a recognition for 200 million Dalits."

It was the second consecutive year that the Tulip Award was not presented in person. The 2011 winner, Chinese activist Ni Yulan, had been unable to attend the ceremony as she was in custody and awaiting trial in a case.

When asked what he would do with his prize, Bharathan stated that he would like to set up a training centre "to help educate Dalits to demand their legitimate rights through peaceful and legal methods."

=== Questions in Dutch Parliament ===
On 28 January 2013, the Minister of Foreign Affairs, Mr. Timmermans, and the Minister of Foreign Trade and Development Co-operation, Lilianne Ploumen were asked in the Dutch House of Representatives what steps the Dutch government would take to support Bharathan in his struggle for the human rights of Dalits. This was in reference to "the criminal court case against him and 23 other Dalit accused due to a – according to human rights organisations – false accusation of murder and the obstruction of Bharathan’s work by the Tamil Nadu government." The matter was raised again on 12 March, with a question on whether the Dutch government would address with the Indian government "the problems Bharathan is facing at the hands of the Indian government – including a ban on organising or participating in demonstrations," and, if so, when and how this would be done.

The reply, in part, was that "The Netherlands respects the Indian legal system and therefore does not interfere in this ongoing case. Contact with Mr. Bharathan will be maintained, also in view of the further development of the [Tulip] Award."
