= Pax Christi International Peace Award =

Roman Catholic peace award

The Pax Christi International Peace Award is given out every year since 1988 by the Christian peace organisation Pax Christi to other peace organisations and peace activists. The focus lies on grassroots activists and organisations that are active in an ongoing conflict, working against violence and injustice. It is considered one of the most important peace awards awarded by international non-governmental organizations.

The award is funded by the Cardinal Bernardus Alfrink Peace Fund and the board of the organisation Pax Christi International decides the winners. The annual award recipients usually get media attention in Catholic news outlets worldwide.

== Recipients ==
- 1988: Margarida Maria Alves (Confederação Nacional dos Trabalhadores na Agricultura), Brazil
- 1989: Luis Pérez Aguirre, Uruguay
- 1990: Dana Nemcova, Czech Republic
- 1991: Osservatorio Meridionale, Italy
- 1992: Joaquim Pinto de Andrade, Angola
- 1993: Ray Williams and Dorraine Booth-Williams, USA
- 1994: José Mpundu E'Booto, Democratic Republic of the Congo
- 1995: Janina Ochojska, Poland
- 1996: Franjo Komarica, Hadzi Haillovic, Jelena Santic and Gordana Stojanovic, Croatia, Bosnia and Herzegovina, Serbia
- 1997: Domingos Soares and Maria de Lourdes Martins Cruz, East Timor
- 1998: Laurien Ntezimana and Modeste Mungwarareba, Rwanda
- 1999: Clonard Fitzroy Fellowship, Northern Ireland
- 2000: Ann Pettifor and Laura Vargas (Jubilee 2000), UK and Peru
- 2001: Eddie Kneebone and Teesta Setavaid, Australia
- 2002: Roberto Layson, Philippines
- 2003: Franjo Starcevic, Croatia
- 2004: Sérgio Vieira de Mello, Brazil
- 2005: Jacques Delors, France
- 2006: Ogarit Younan and Rami George Khouri, Lebanon, Palestine/Jordan
- 2007: Women's Active Museum on War and Peace, Japan
- 2008: Luiz Flávio Cappio, Brazil
- 2009: Justine Masika Bihamba, Democratic Republic of the Congo
- 2010: Louis Raphaël I Sako, Iraq
- 2011: Pontanima, Bosnia and Herzegovina
- 2012: John Onaiyekan, Nigeria
- 2013: Memorial, Russia
- 2014: Jesuit Refugee Service, Syria
- 2015: Women, Peace and Security Collective for Reflection and Action, Colombia
- 2016: Catholic Commission for Justice and Peace of Pakistan and Human Rights Commission of Pakistan, Pakistan
- 2017: ZODEVITE, Mexico
- 2018: No Boundaries Coalition, USA
- 2019: European Lawyers in Lesvos (ELIL), Greece
- 2020: Pacific Climate Warriors
- 2021: Catholic Radio Network for South Sudan and Nuba Mountains, South Sudan
- 2022: CONCORDIA Social Projects
- 2023: The Parents Circle-Families Forum
- 2024: Haiti Justice and Peace Commission (JILAP) and Sis. Gladys Montesinos, Peru

== See also ==
- Pope Paul VI Teacher of Peace Award
- Catholic peace traditions
