= Justine Masika Bihamba =

Congolese activist

- Born: 1966 (age 59–60)
- Citizenship: Democratic Republic of the Congo
- Known for: Synergy of Women for Victims of Sexual Violence
- Notable work: Human Rights Watch report on the condition of women in the east of DRC

Justine Masika Bihamba (born c. 1966) is a Congolese activist. As coordinator of Synergy of Women for Victims of Sexual Violence, she works to improve the lives of rural women, defend human rights and assist victims of war, especially women survivors of acts of sexual violence. This work is focussed in the province of North Kivu, and she has also campaigned for justice more widely in the Democratic Republic of Congo (DRC). She has won considerable international recognition for her achievements. She has on several occasions been subject to threats of arrest or death.

== Early life and career ==
Masika Bihamba was born in Democratic Republic of Congo to a father who was a merchant and mother who did not attend school. She obtained a national diploma in 1985, and subsequently trained in community development, activity planning, mediation and conflict management. In 2002 she contributed to a Human Rights Watch report on the condition of women in the east of DRC.

== Founding and work of Synergy ==
In 2002 Masika Bihamba helped to carry out a survey of violence committed against women in emergency camps set up for people displaced by an eruption of the Nyiragongo volcano. Following consultation with other organisations, a decision was taken to establish Synergy of Women for Victims of Sexual Violence (SFVS). The organisation is divided into three sections: a psycho-social section, a medical section and a legal defence section. Since then, SFVS has provided over 18 000 women with emotional, medical and legal support, and has documented the incidence of rape in North Kivu, calling for the arrest and trial of the perpetrators. Synergy of Women for Victims of Sexual Violence (SFVS) is a coalition of 35 women's organization that supports victims of violence. The organization has been able to evacuate only 250 displaced women in Goma, despite more than 4,000 being displaced, due to funding constraints.

== Participation in other networks ==
Masika Bihamba is also an active member of a wide range of other networks, such as Oxfam Novib, Human Rights Watch, Amnesty International, the Belgian Development Cooperation, Usaid, and other humanitarian, political and development agencies. Her organization Synergie des Femmes partners with international women's group Donor Direct Action.

== Testifies to ICC review conference ==
Masika Bihamba testified to the 2010 Review Conference of the Rome Statute of the International Criminal Court (ICC) in Kampala, Uganda. She pointed to the importance of implementing specific measures to support women who had become victims of sexual crimes and consequently often suffered from trauma and stigmatization. In her view, such assistance to date had been insufficient and should not be limited to financial aid.

== Attacks and threats ==
- On 18 September 2007, six men, reportedly DRC Army (FARDC) soldiers, broke into Masika Bihamba’s house in Goma. The men reportedly asked for Masika Bihamba, who was absent, and began to search the house. One girl was sexually assaulted, and another was kicked in the face with such force that a tooth was knocked out. When Masika Bihamba returned home during the attack, the men fled. The alleged perpetrators were later identified as soldiers forming the personal guard of an FARDC colonel, but were never arrested or brought to trial, despite the submission of a legal complaint against them by Masika Bihamba nine days after the attack. The daughters later fled abroad for their safety.
- On 27 December 2010, a magistrate from the Goma Military Prosecutor’s Department called Masika Bihamba to warn her that she might be arrested if she continued to denounce the human rights violations committed in eastern DRC. This followed her appearance on 28 November on the TV5 programme “And what if you told me the whole truth” (Et si vous me disiez toute la vérité), during which Masika Bihamba had spoken in particular about the impunity, sexual violence and human rights violations perpetrated by General Bosco Ntaganda.
- In March 2011 Masika Bihamba received threats resulting from her human rights activities, in particular her calls for the rapid implementation of Section 1502 of the U.S. Dodd-Frank Act, dealing with transparency of sourcing of “conflict minerals” from DRC.
- On 14 March 2012, during an interview on BBC radio, Masika Bihamba again called for the arrest of Ntaganda. A few weeks later on April 10, she and other Congolese civil society leaders met President Joseph Kabila, repeating calls for Ntaganda’s arrest. On 27 April she received death threats by SMS text message. After Ntaganda’s men surrounded her youngest brother’s house, she fled from Goma for temporary exile in a European country. She returned to DRC in 2013 after Ntaganda gave himself up for trial at the International Criminal Court..

== Awards ==
- Justine Masika Bihamba was one of the 1000 women proposed for the Nobel Peace Prize 2005.
- She received the Human Rights Tulip award from the Netherlands government on 10 December 2008.
- In 2009 she was awarded the Pax Christi International Peace Award.
