= Koreti Tiumalu =

Samoan climate activist

Koreti Mavaega Tiumalu (died 2 July 2017) was a New Zealand-Samoan climate activist. She was the coordinator of 350.org in the Pacific Region, and a coordinator of the Pacific Climate Warriors, a network of grassroots climate activist groups from Pacific Island nations and communities.

Tiumalu was born in Wellington, New Zealand. She worked as a civil servant before leaving the service to become climate activist. Some of her notable climate awareness campaign include blockade of the Newcastle coal port in Australia and a three-day prayer vigil climate justice campaign at the Vatican, Rome in 2015. She died on 2 July 2017.
