= Roberto Layson =

Filipino Catholic priest and interreligious dialogue advocate

Roberto Layson is a Filipino Priest and a member of Oblate Missionary Immaculate, a Catholic religious organization.

== Career ==
He wrote over 100 stories of his personal experiences in religious dialogue for his MindaNews.com column, 'Fields of Hope'. Layson served as coordinator of the Oblates’ Inter-religious Ministry from 1998 to 2008.

== Recognition ==
He was awarded the Ninoy Aquino Fellowship Award for Public Service in 2004 and 2006. He was awarded the Pax Christi International Peace Award in 2002.

Roberto Layson was recognized "for building a culture of peace among Christians, Muslims and indigenous people in an area of armed conflict". He was the author of Fields of Hope. Layson was conferred the honorary degree of Doctor of Humanities by the Ateneo De Davao University in Davao City, Philippines on March 28, 2015
