= Abir Ghattas =

Lebanese activist

Abir Ghattas is a Lebanese activist, blogger, information security technologist, and the founder of Hammam Radio, a participatory feminist online radio platform. She currently serves as the Chief Information Officer at Human Rights Watch and is based in Berlin.

== Career ==
Ghattas holds a BSc in Computer Sciences and Mathematics, and an MA in Communication and Digital Strategies. Ghattas was previously Digital Communications and Outreach Director at Raseef22, a liberal Arabic media network founded in 2013, and Outreach Director at Majal, a digital media outlet.

In 2017, Ghattas was appointed to the Advisory Board of global digital rights organisation Access Now. In 2021, she was appointed to the International Board of freedom of expression organisation Article 19.

In 2020, in response to the COVID-19 pandemic, Ghattas and Rasha Hilwi launched Hammam Radio, initially as a digital home for Hammam Talks, a then in-person event series held in Berlin, and later as a feminist online space for women from the Arab world to share their stories and experiences. After 3 months, Hammam Radio had 60,000 listeners, with listeners based in almost every Arab country. Although originally aimed at an Arab language audience, the platform was open to women to book slots in any language.

In her position at Human Rights Watch, Ghattas has been part of investigating high-profile security incidents, including the revelation that Pegasus spyware was found on the devices of a staff member at Human Rights Watch and other activists. After serving as Director of Information Security at Human Rights Watch since 2022, in 2025 she was promoted to the Chief Information Officer role, where she leads the organisation's technology team and oversees technology strategy and infrastructure.

Ghattas has spoken at conferences and events around the world, including Bread&Net, the International Journalism Festival, RightsCon and re:publica.
