= Pacific Climate Warriors =

Climate activist group from the Pacific Islands

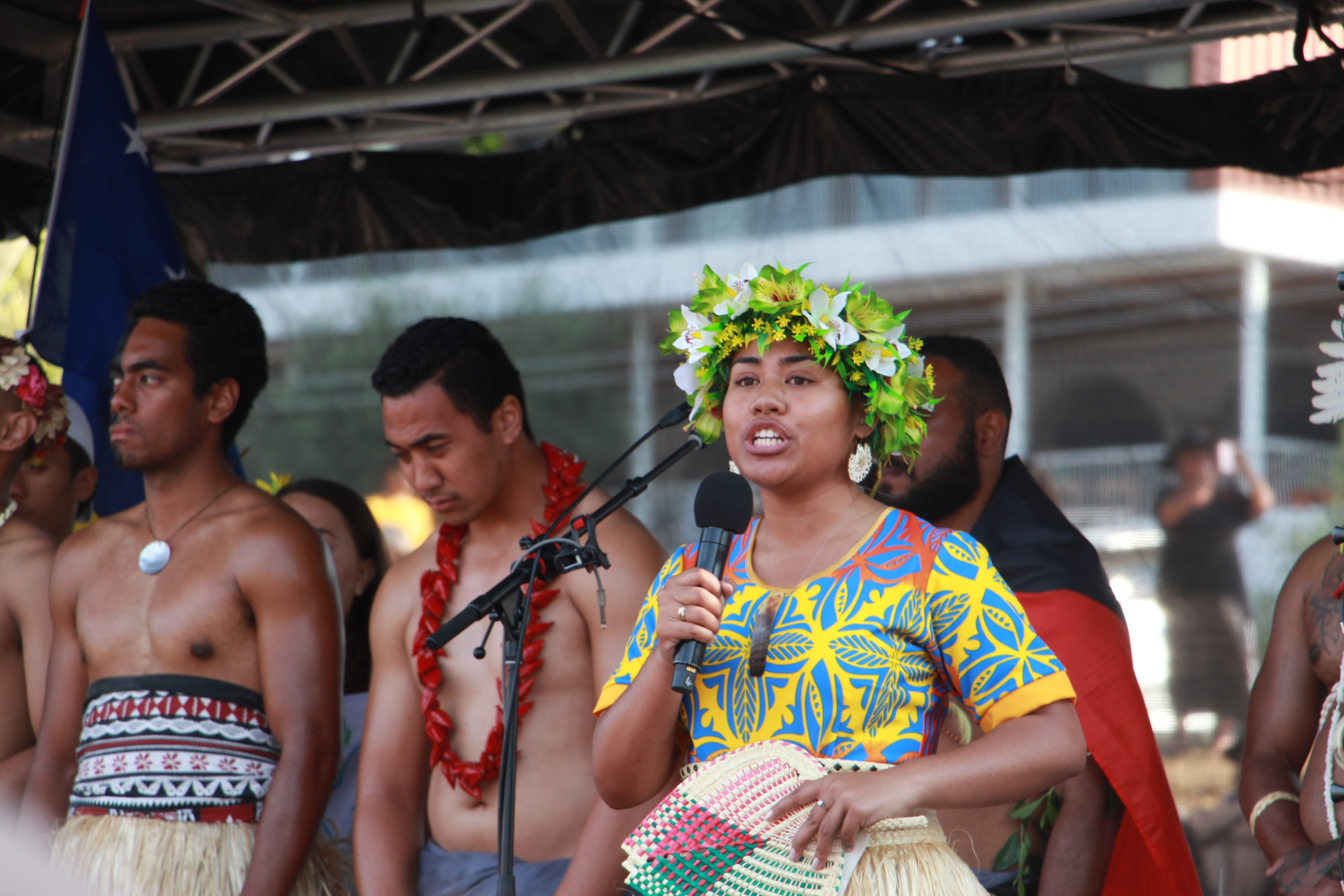
Pacific Climate Warriors on a school strike for climate 2019 in Brisbane

Pacific Climate Warriors, or 350 Pacific, is a grassroots movement for climate justice from the Pacific island states, which has been part of the global environmental organization 350.org since 2013.

== Approach ==
The Pacific Climate Warriors are addressing decision makers and demanding pollution and excessive greenhouse gas emissions to be reduced. They are committed to protecting the Pacific islands and their culture, land and marine habitats from climate change. They oppose the fossil fuel industry. Their core message is: "We are not drowning. We are fighting.". They take part in the United Nations climate negotiations.

Through educational projects in 15 countries in the region, the Pacific Climate Warriors try to explain to young people the consequences of climate change and the impact on the islands. In doing so, they want to motivate more people to work for the protection of the islands.

== Canoe blockade 2014 ==
One of their more notable actions was a campaign in Australia from 8 to 25 October 2014, the key element was a civil disobedience action on 17 October 2014 in Newcastle, where the world's largest coal port is located. There, the group paddled out in traditional canoes and kayaks with the help of hundreds of Australian locals to prevent coal ships from entering and leaving the port. According to the group, only four of the twelve ships that were due to pass through the port on that day were able to do so, while the others were all successfully blocked by the group. The canoes used during the blockade were built in the Pacific islands using traditional methods and were brought to Australia by cargo ship specifically for the operation.

In the campaign, they demanded that companies that work with fossil fuels and countries with high greenhouse gas emissions take responsibility for their climate-damaging actions. By reporting on the effects of climate change on the Pacific islands in media reports, they wanted to raise awareness of the need to reduce greenhouse gas emissions.

During the campaign, 30 members of the group from 12 different Pacific countries (including Fiji, Kiribati, Papua New Guinea, the Republic of the Marshall Islands, Tokelau, Tonga, Tuvalu and Vanuatu) travelled to Australia.

== 2021 COP26 meeting ==
Pacific Climate Warriors were represented at protests in London ahead of the 2021 COP26 climate negotiations.

== Awards ==
- 2020: Pax Christi International Peace Award.

== See also ==
- Koreti Tiumalu
