= Laurien Ntezimana =

- Born: 1955 (age 70–71); Butare, Rwanda-Urundi

Laurien Ntezimana (born 1955) is a Rwandan Catholic theologian, sociologist and peace activist known for protecting Tutsi during the Rwandan genocide of 1994.

== Personal life ==
Ntezimana was born in 1955 in Butare prefecture, where he lived at the time of the genocide. By 2011, Ntezimana was living in Belgium.

== Opposition to the genocide ==
During the genocide Ntezimana was known to protect Tutsi. Despite his reputation, he was elected by the community of Ngoma sector in Ngoma commune (just outside Butare town) to the local "security committee" set up in May. As the committee was supposed to act only by consensus, Ntezimana and another member were able to block searches by demanding proof of RPF connections.

== After the genocide ==
On 15 September 1994, Ntezimana issued a document denouncing the climate of terror created by the new government.

Ntezimana was later a founder of the Association Modeste et Innocent (AMI), a civil-society group founded in February 2000, "working to promote individual dignity and national peace and reconciliation". He was also involved in publishing Ubuntu, a bulletin of AMI. In early 2002, Ntezimana and two others from AMI were arrested by the Rwandan government. They were questioned about Ubuntu's alleged sympathy for Pasteur Bizimungu, and Ntezimana was released without charge after about a month. However, AMI was banned, and Ubuntu was forced to cease publication. AMI is still in existence, and has an official website.

Ntezimana is a teacher for the University of Peace in Africa, an organization partnered with AMI.

Laurien Ntezimana appeared in the documentary D'Arusha à Arusha from 2008.

== Honors and awards ==
Ntezimana has received recognition for his work, including:

- 1998: Pax Christi International Peace Award, for "training young leaders in Rwanda to be agents of reconciliation between ethnic groups".
- 2003: Theodor-Haecker-Preis for Political Courageousness and Veracity.
- 2013: Harubuntu Award for Civil society.

== See also ==
- Rwandan genocide
- Human rights in Rwanda
