= Audrey Mbugua =

Kenyan transgender activist (born 1984)

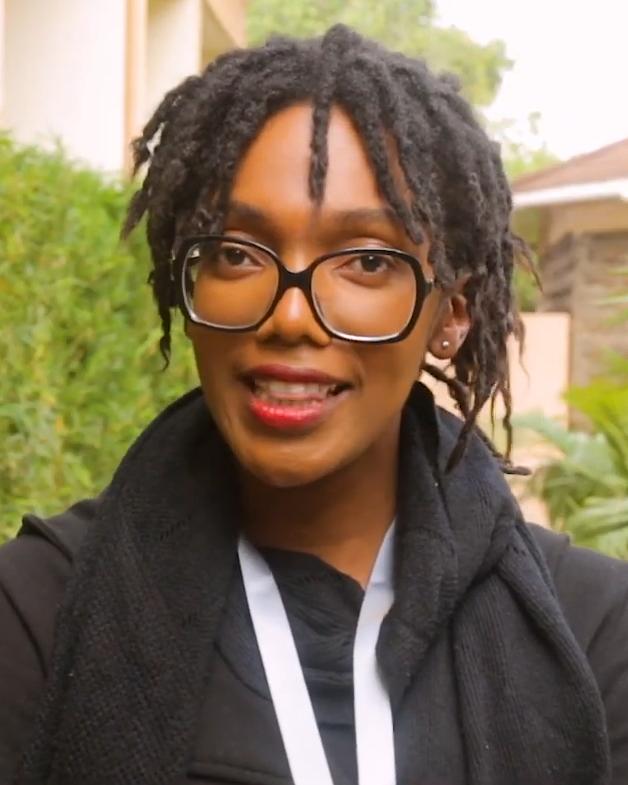
- Mbugua in 2018
- Born: 1984 (age 41–42); Central Kenya
- Citizenship: Kenyan
- Education: Kiambu High School (1998–2001); Maseno University (BSc Biomedical Engineering, 2003–2007)
- Occupation: Transgender activist
- Organization(s): Transgender Education and Advocacy
- Known for: Transgender rights activism and landmark legal cases in Kenya
- Notable work: Legal recognition of name and gender marker change in Kenya
- Awards: Nominee, Human Rights Tulip Award (2014)

Audrey Mbugua (born 1984) is a Kenyan transgender activist who has successfully litigated a number of court cases defending the rights of transgender people.

== Early life and education ==
Mbugua is a transgender woman who was born in Central Kenya. She attended Kiambu High School from 1998 to 2001. She then studied biomedical engineering at Maseno University from 2003 to 2007. She was assigned male at birth and given the name Andrew Ithibu Mbugua. She attended Kiambu Boys High School and sat KCSE in 2001. At Maseno University she graduated in 2006 with a Bachelor of Science in Biomedical Sciences, specialising in medical biotechnology. She later studied for a master's degree in information systems at KCA University in Nairobi. She started dressing in women's clothes while at university, attracting ridicule and rejection.

== Activism ==
She was the first transgender woman in east Africa to legally change her name in official documents and to register the first international transgender-led non-profit in Africa.

In July 2014 the High Court of Kenya ordered government of Kenya to register Mbugua's lobby, Transgender Education and Advocacy, and pay its legal fees.

In October 2014, in a landmark case, the High Court of Kenya ordered the Kenya National Examinations Council to change Mbugua's name on her academic certificates, and also to remove the male gender mark on them. Since transitioning, the fact her academic certificates no longer reflected her gender was preventing her from being employed.

In 2014, Mbugua was nominated for the Dutch ministry of Foreign Affairs' Human Rights Tulip award for her activism. In 2018, the government of Kenya was ordered to pay Mbugua USD300,000 to cover her legal costs and special damages.

In 2020, Mbugua and two other individuals filed a lawsuit when they were unable to amend their birth certificates. On May 20, 2026, the High Court of Kenya ruled that Kenyans must be allowed to change gender markers on their identification documents.

== See also ==
- LGBT rights in Kenya
