= Flavie Villanueva =

Filipino Catholic priest and activist (born 1970)

The Reverend Father Flavie Villanueva SVD
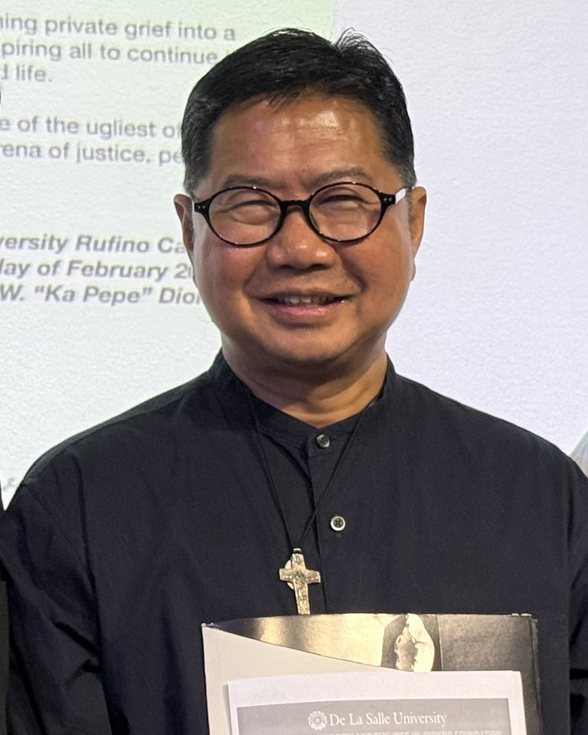
- Villanueva in 2026
- Born: Flaviano Antonio Lopez Villanueva; December 17, 1970 (age 55)
- Occupation: Priest
- Known for: Kalinga Center and Project Paghilom

Ecclesiastical career
- Religion: Roman Catholic
- Ordained: 2006
- Congregations: Society of the Divine Word

Flaviano Antonio Lopez Villanueva is a Filipino Roman Catholic priest and human rights activist who is best known for his work related to former President Rodrigo Duterte's war on drugs in the Philippines.

== Early life ==
Flavie Villanueva was born on December 17, 1970, and is a self-confessed former drug addict. According to his own account, he first developed drug dependency as a 14-year old teenager in Manila. He also started smoking as a grade schooler and still became a varsity swimmer at sixth grade. In high school, he abused alcohol, Nitrazepam and marijuana with his friends and manage to keep his vices a secret from his family.

He later worked in the corporate sector. In 1994, he went to a hermitage place in Munting Bukal in Tagaytay seeking to recover from his condition.

== Ministry and activism ==
At the World Youth Day 1995, Villanueva served as a guide to the Canadian delegate and realized his vocation was to be a "communicator" of his faith. Villanueva began volunteering and served as a lay missionary in Mindanao and Bicol. He joined a seminary in 1998 and was ordained in 2006 with the Society of the Divine Word at the Divine Word Seminary in Tagaytay. He preached for some time in Timor Leste.

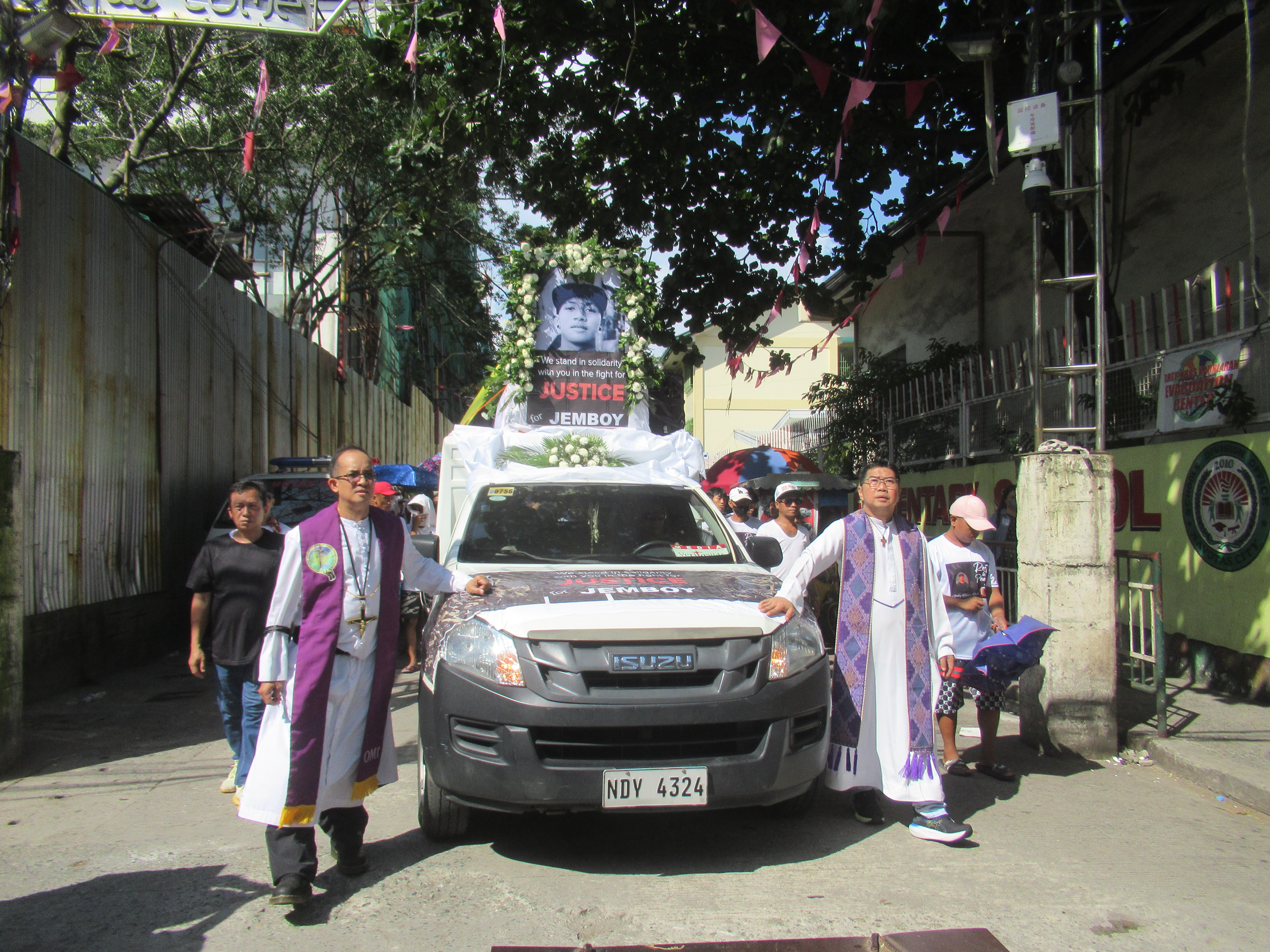
Villanueva (right) accompanying a funeral motorcade for Jemboy Baltazar who died due to police operation lapses in 2023.

In July 16, 2015, Villanueva established the Arnold Janssen Kalinga Center in Tayuman, Manila to cater to the homeless and other members of the marginalized groups. The Kalinga Center in collaboration with the Department of Education provides education through the Alternative Learning System.

Project Paghilom (transl. healing) was launched in 2016 response to the President Rodrigo Duterte's war on drugs and provided support to the families killed by extrajudicial killing due to being suspected as being drug users. The Dambana ng Paghilom (transl. shrine of healing) was La Loma Cemetery in Caloocan was built in memorial to those killed. In 2019, Villanueva has stated he has received death threats allegedly due to his criticism on Duterte's campaign on drugs.

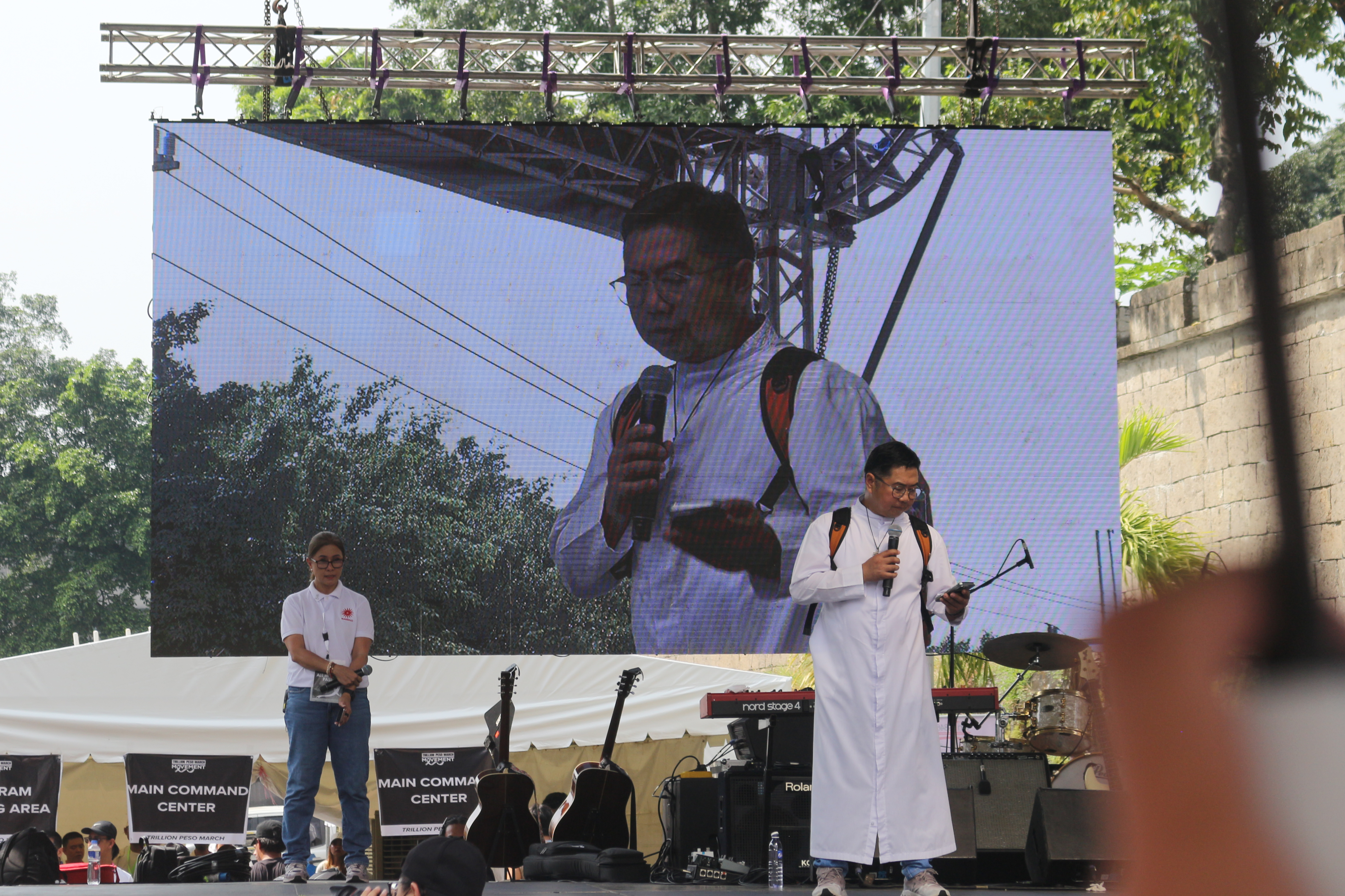
Villanueva speaking during the second Trillion Peso March at the People Power Monument.

In 2020, Villanueva along with nine others were charged with sedition by the Duterte administration for allegedly involved in the spreading of the Ang Totoong Narcolist videos which claims that Duterte himself and his associates of being involved in the illegal drug trade. The charges was dropped on September 6, 2023, due to lack of evidence.

After the Duterte administration he continued his work. He has appeared in the Senate Blue Ribbon Committee inquiry on the drug war in 2024.

In December 2025, Villanueva was among the complainants of the plunder charge against Vice President Sara Duterte.

== Awards and recognition ==
In 2021, Villanueva was awarded the Human Rights Tulip award from the Dutch government for his work associated with the Paghilom program. In 2025, he was conferred the Ramon Magsaysay Award.
