= Maria de Lourdes Martins Cruz =

- Mana Lou
- Born: 1962 (age 63–64); Liquica, East Timor
- Occupation: Social worker
- Years active: 1985 -
- Known for: Founder of the lay order the Brothers and Sisters in Christ
- Awards: 1997 Pax Christi International peace prize 2009 Sergio Vieira De Mello Human Rights Award; 2018 Ramon Magsaysay Award

Maria de Lourdes Martins Cruz is an East Timorese Roman Catholic sister dedicated to the service of the poor.

== Biography ==
She was born in Liquica, East Timor in 1962. After an education interrupted by the independence struggle, she joined the Canossian Daughters of Charity as a novice. In 1985 she went to Indonesia to study theology at a Jesuit institute in Yogjakarta. In 1989 she returned home to start a lay order the Brothers and Sisters in Christ. She built a training institute for girls and women in Dare. She has dedicated her life to "changing the plight of the poor by working on the roots of the problems". She became known by the name Mana Lou.

Her order runs three orphanages, at Dare, Aileu and Viqueque. Sr Lourdes tries to educate the orphans to become independent and eventually self-sufficient. Besides attending the local school in the native language Tetum, the children are taught catechism, as well as agriculture, cooking and such crafts as sewing and embroidering.

After independence she teamed up with a visiting American doctor, Dan Murphy and together they set up a medical clinic for the poor. From 1999 to 2018 the clinic averaged about 300 patients a day and was one of the busiest clinics in East Timor. It had a pharmacy, laboratory, TB and maternity wards. In 2018 the clinic was about to shut down after funding dried up.

== Awards ==
In 1997 she was awarded the Pax Christi International Peace Award for her work on the education, development and dignity of people in poor communities in East Timor.

In December 2009 she was awarded the Sergio Vieira De Mello Human Rights Award for promoting social, economic and cultural rights by President Jose Ramos-Horta.

In 2012 she received the N-Peace Award under the Role Models for Peace category.

On July 2, 2018, she was awarded the Ramon Magsaysay Award by Carmencita Abella, president of the Ramon Magsaysay Award Foundation in Manila, for her work in uplifting the poorest of the poor in Timor-Leste and establishing the Bairo-Ata Clinic, a free clinic for the poor that averages 300 patients daily and the largest provider of tuberculosis treatment in East Timor. The award is the Asian equivalent of the Nobel Prize.
