= Esra'a Al Shafei =

Bahraini activist (born 1986)

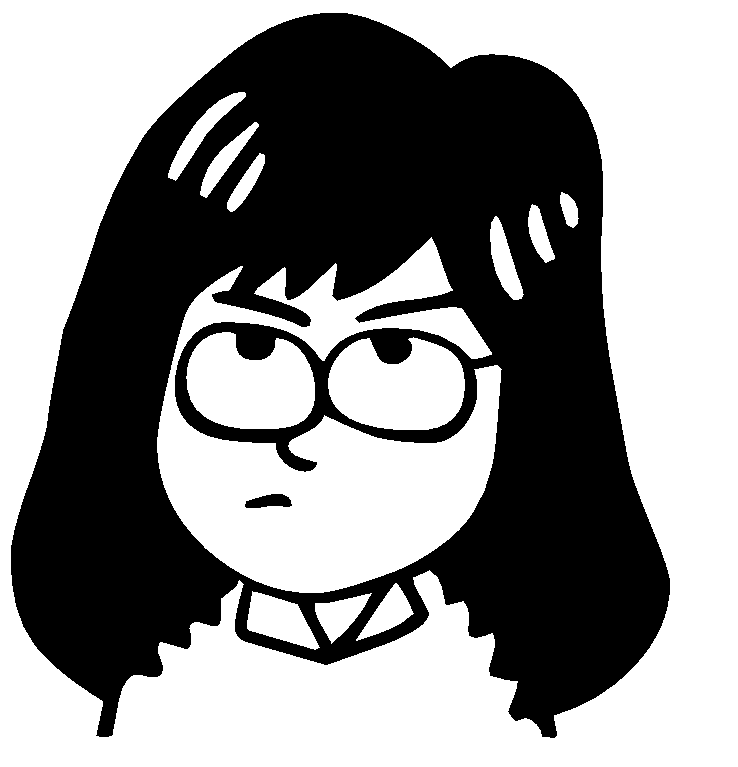
- Avatar used by Al Shafei
- Born: 23 July 1986 (age 39)
- Organization: Majal (Mideast Youth)
- Website: majal.org

Esra'a Al Shafei (Arabic: إسراء الشافعي, ’Asrā’ ash-Shāfa’ī, pronounced [ʔasraːʔ aʃːafaʔiː]; born 23 July 1986) is a Bahraini civil rights activist, blogger, and the founder and executive director of Majal (Mideast Youth) and its related projects, including CrowdVoice.org. Al Shafei is a senior TED Fellow, an Echoing Green fellow, and has been referred to by CNN reporter George Webster as "An outspoken defender of free speech". She has been featured in Fast Company magazine as one of the "100 Most Creative People in Business." In 2011, The Daily Beast listed Al Shafei as one of the 17 bravest bloggers worldwide. She is also a promoter of music as a means of social change, and founded Mideast Tunes, which is currently the largest platform for underground musicians in the South West Asia (formerly called Middle East) and North Africa.

In 2008, Al Shafei received the Berkman Award for Internet Innovation from the Berkman Klein Center for Internet & Society at Harvard Law School in 2008 for "outstanding contributions to the internet and its impact on society." In 2012, she received a Shuttleworth Foundation Fellowship for her work on the open source platform CrowdVoice.org. She is also the recipient of the Monaco Media Prize, which acknowledges innovative uses of media for the betterment of humanity. In 2014, she was featured in Forbes magazine's "30 Under 30" list of social entrepreneurs making an impact in the world. The World Economic Forum listed her as one of "15 Women Changing the World in 2015." That same year, she won the "Most Courageous Media" Prize from Free Press Unlimited. Al Shafei was selected as a 2017 Director's Fellow at the MIT Media Lab. In 2018 she was chosen as one of BBC's 100 Women.

Al Shafei was a keynote speaker at Wikimania 2017. In December of the same year, she was appointed to the Wikimedia Foundation Board of Trustees. In January 2023, she was appointed to the board of The Tor Project.

In April 2024, Al Shafei announced that she was joining SimpleX Chat, a UK-based privacy-oriented messaging provider founded by Evgeny Poberezkin. She left that position to create Surveillance Watch, which was launched later that year. In 2025, she received a Senior Mozilla Foundation Fellowship to expand upon the platform.

== Background ==
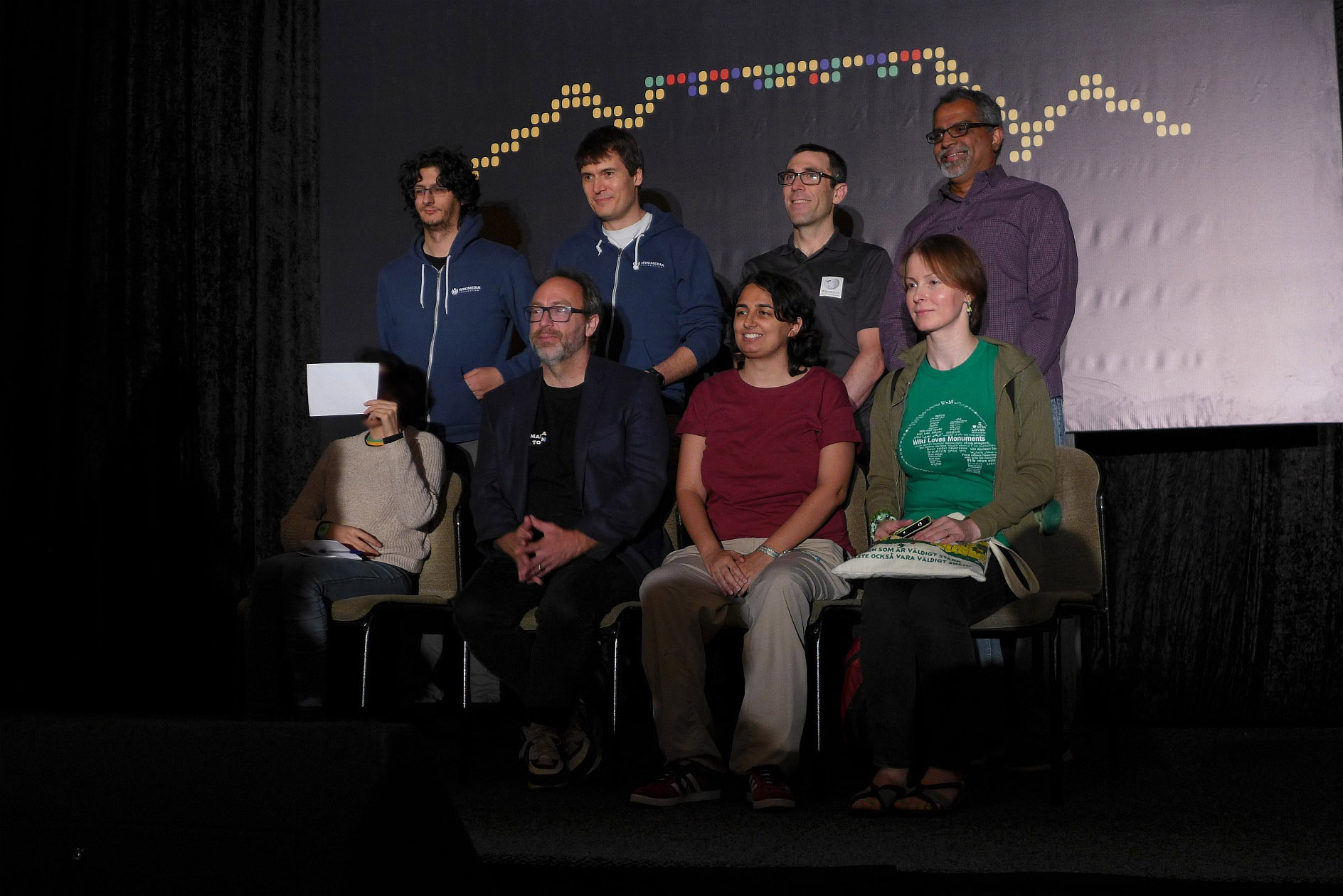
Al Shafei (leftmost sitting) at Wikimania 2018, covering her face with a piece of paper

Esra'a Al Shafei, according to her own account, recalls witnessing inhumane treatment of migrant workers as a child. This, along with stereotypical media portrayals of Middle Eastern youth, prompted her to found the Mideast Youth network. Over time, the network expanded to include other civil rights issues within the Middle East, and branched out to create a diverse range of platforms with a global reach.

We want our humanity and our futures in our own hands and we use the internet and other forms of technology to fight for those rights

— Esra'a Al Shafei

In 2006, she started blogging with WordPress. She uses Twitter to communicate, but deletes her tweets if they go viral.

The consequences of attending a metal or rock event is a topic of discussion that's frequently raised on Mideast Youth.

It isn't just young people but professionals who don't want to put their jobs on the line who are worried. Women, in particular, express concern about harming their reputation.

A lot of times you'll find people secretly arranging to attend these groups.

— Esra'a Al Shafei

Her music streaming site is a way for underground music to penetrate isolated markets, such as the Middle East and North Africa. Her sites can push information out to the masses that is not found in mainstream outlets. Al Shafei has blogged for CNN and the Huffington Post.

Al Shafei does not show her face online and uses an illustration instead because, as an activist in an authoritarian regime, she has been threatened with violence and it would put her and her family at risk if she were recognisable.
