= Lilit Martirosyan =

Armenian LGBTQ+ rights activist

Lilit Martirosyan (Armenian: Լիլիթ Մարտիրոսյան) is an Armenian LGBTQ+ rights activist known for her 2019 speech to the Armenian Parliament and for founding the Right Side NGO, an Armenian transgender rights group.

== Early life ==
Lilit Martirosyan is a transgender woman. She recalls preferring playing with jewelry more than the trucks and tractors that she routinely received as gifts as a child. After facing intense bullying and family conflicts as a child, her parents not supportive of her transgender identity, she moved out of her parents' home to live on her own at the age of 13. Despite working both as a waitress and a cook, she was eventually forced to do sex work to earn enough money to survive and to be able to afford hormone therapy. By the time she was 18, she had saved enough money to begin her medical transition with hormonal therapy and gender-affirming surgeries.

== Career ==
=== Right Side NGO ===
In 2016, she co-founded the Right Side NGO, a human rights awareness raising group that works to defend the trans community and sex workers, defending their interests and lobbying for their rights and protections.

Right Side NGO has three main areas of focus: human rights, community health and safety, and awareness raising for the trans community and sex workers in which it serves. The human rights oriented goals of Right Side are to increase the capacity for the trans community and sex workers in the field of human rights and advocacy, to develop policy that promotes equal rights on national and local levels, and to research and analyze the legal policies for trans people and sex workers, monitoring human rights violations against those communities. The goals of Right Side pertaining to community health and safety include preventing HIV, AIDS, and STDs among the trans community and sex workers, raising awareness about sexual health, reproductive health, mental health, and safety concerns for trans people and sex workers, and ensuring equal access to high quality medical care. The goals related to awareness raising include providing objective information about sexuality and gender to the trans community and mainstream society, organizing campaigns to raise awareness for trans and sex worker issues, and working with the media to ensure these issues are properly and fairly covered in the news.

Services that Right Side NGO offer span widely, but some examples are:

- providing legal consultancies and representation
- monitoring and reporting human rights violations
- healthcare, psychological, and social counseling services, including a hotline service
- distributing safer sex packages and STI tests
- hosting cultural events related to trans issues and gender identity
- developing and distributing monthly e-magazines

In 2023, Martirosyan and Right Side staff members went on a working visit to the United States, and met with organizations such as the National Endowment for Democracy, Urgent Action Fund for Women's Human Rights, Human Rights Campaign, Global Fund for Women, Freedom House, Astraea Lesbian Foundation For Justice, and the National Democratic Institute. GALAS LGBTQ+ Armenian Society hosted Right Side NGO founder Lilit Martirosyan in Glendale, California for a public discussion on the situation of LGBTQ+ people in Armenia, discrimination and human rights violations, and how supporters living in the United States can support LGBTQ+ people living in Armenia. At the GALAS event, California State Senator Anthony Portantino presented Martirosyan with a Certificate of Recognition.

=== 2019 Speech to General Assembly ===
In April 2019, Martirosyan made a speech to the National Assembly of Armenia, making her the first out transgender woman to do so. In her speech, she described the violence and discrimination faced by the trans community in Armenia, saying that they were left "unemployed, poor and morally abandoned," and talked about the influence of the LGBT+ community in the 2018 Armenian revolution in the hopes for better rights. She speaks powerfully and with conviction, advocating for the “tortured, raped, burnt, stabbed, killed, banished, discriminated, poor and unemployed transgender people of Armenia.” Her goal in speaking is to raise awareness of transgender and sex worker issues and implore the Armenian government to increase attention to trans human rights. She states her objective to the parliament clearly: "I call upon you to carry out reforms and policies to achieve gender equality, and to ensure human rights for everyone.”

==== Response ====
Her speech faced a significant backlash. She received death threats, doxxing, and calls from members of Parliament threatening to harm her or suggesting she should be killed. Many members of parliament opposed the expansion of trans rights and responded to Martirosyan with aggression. Gagik Tsarukyan, the head of the second-largest faction in parliament, said that “as the leader of the Prosperous Armenia party, head of a family steeped in Armenian traditions and faith, I say [transgender rights] is not going to pass,” followed by a statement suggesting that trans visibility is a "vice" that must be hidden. Naira Zohrabyan, the representative of the chair of the Assembly's Human Rights Committee and a member of the Prosperous Armenia party, accused her of having "violated our agenda," despite having been the member of parliament who gave the floor to Martirosyan, and with Prosperous Armenia member of parliament Vartan Ghukasyan calling for trans people to be "expelled from the country". Prime Minister Nikol Pashinyan accused Zohrabyan of staging the speech as a "political provocation."

Martirosyan developed a pattern of anxiety and panic attacks in response to this backlash, which was dismissed by doctors when she sought medical attention. In response to consistently being harassed in public, she almost exclusively goes into public with a face covering to avoid attack.

== Impact ==
There have not been any significant changes in LGBTIQ+ legislation since Martirosyan's historic 2019 speech to the General Assembly, but she argues that she has "at least brought some visibility to the country's transgender and gay communities." After her speech, Nikol Pashinyan’s government started to speak more about LGBTIQ issues, while former governments never spoke about said issues.

It is now possible for Armenian citizens to change their name in their passport without having to undertake a medical transition, and Martirosyan pioneered this feat.

Since its start in 2016, Right Side NGO documented over 976 cases of violation of trans people rights in Armenia. Martirosyan's work is paramount in illuminating these human rights violations for trans and LGBTIQ people when the government would rather ignore them.

== See also ==
- LGBT rights in Armenia
