= Aahung =

Pakistani non-governmental organization

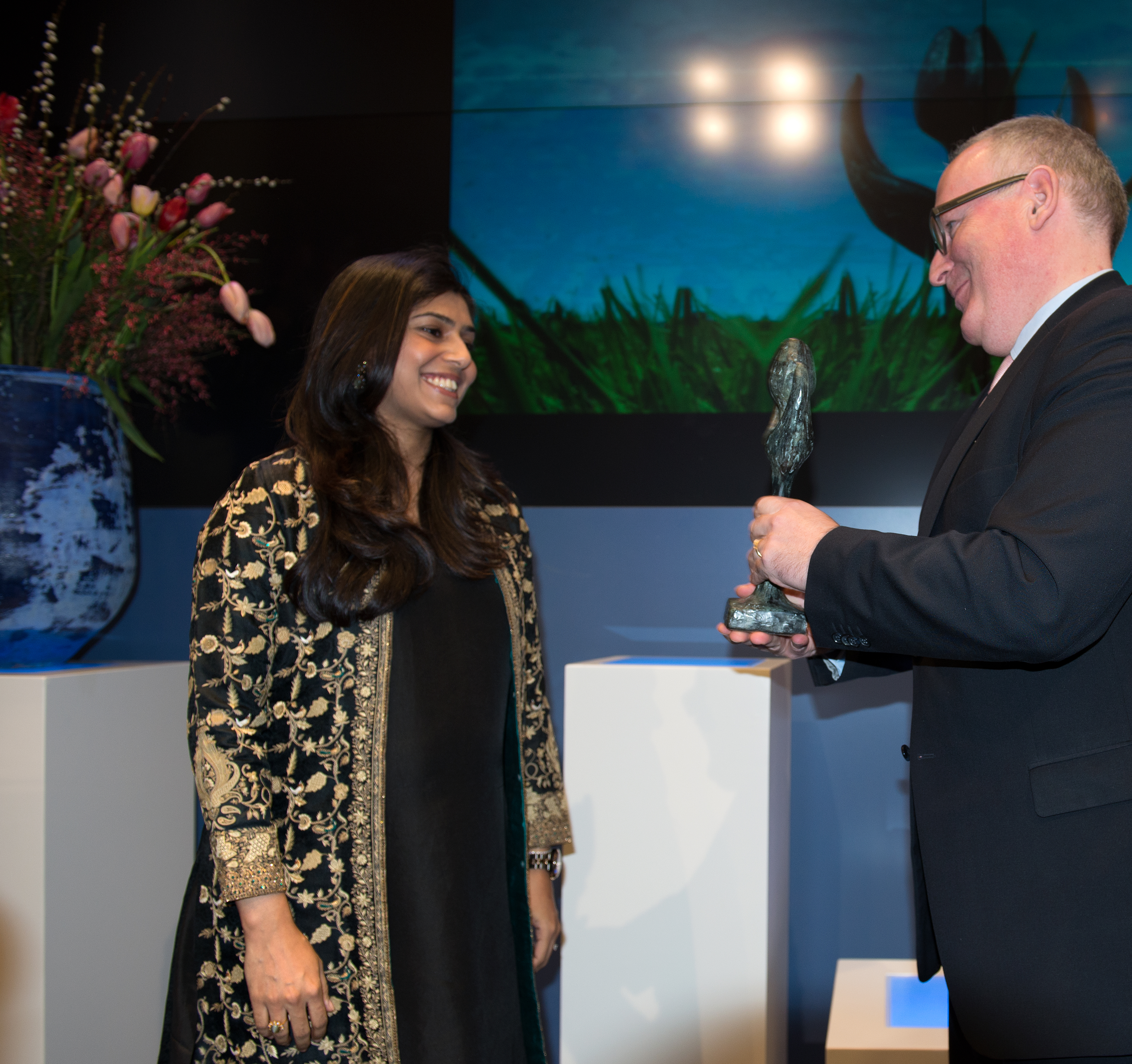
Sheena Hadi, director of Aahung, at presentation of Human Rights Tulip, 2013

Aahung is a non-governmental organisation which aims to improve sexual and reproductive health. It is based in Karachi, Sindh, Pakistan. It was established in 1994, and in 2013 was awarded the annual Human Rights Tulip prize by the Dutch government.

== Aims ==
Aahung is a Karachi-based non-governmental organisation which aims to improve the sexual and reproductive health of men, women, and adolescents across Pakistan. On its website it states its role as “enhancing the scope and improving the quality of services that uphold sexual health and rights, while advocating for an enabling environment where every individual’s sexual health and rights are respected, protected, and fulfilled as an inalienable human right.”

== History ==
Aahung was founded in 1994, bringing together two community-based projects, Karachi Reproductive Health Project (KRHP-1994) and AIDS Awareness Program (AAP-1997), which were aiming to improve the sexual health status of women and adolescents in four low-income urban communities.

The experience and research of project members pointed to a widespread lack of accurate knowledge and understanding about sexual health matters, not only among the general population but among providers of medical services as well. Aahung developed culturally appropriate techniques for providing information and empowering members of the public to make better sexual and reproductive health choices and practise safer behaviours. It improved the skills of medical practitioners in handling consultations about sexual health problems, and drew up more appropriate protocols for managing sexually transmitted disease.

Sheena Hadi, a graduate of Amherst College, Massachusetts, became director of Aahung in 2008.

== Activities ==
The group's own summing up of its activities is: “Functioning in an environment devoid of expertise or resources, Aahung has been successful in developing culturally relevant strategies to respond to the sexual and reproductive health needs of the Pakistani population. Moreover, Aahung has had success in integrating quality sexual and reproductive health education in medical academic and educational institutions across Pakistan.”

Aahung adopts innovative strategies to promote public awareness on critical topics of reproductive health such as gender equality, violence, maternal health, and infection prevention, and to advance reproductive health and rights. It also develops long-term partnerships with organisations and institutions providing education and medical services.

=== Public awareness ===
In a country such as Pakistan, where religious and cultural norms may hinder communication on sexual and reproductive health issues, Aahung has developed culturally appropriate strategies to respond to the sexual health needs of the Pakistani population. It offers specialised training courses and develops information, education and communication materials in provincial languages that can be disseminated through clinics and community workers throughout Pakistan. It widens community outreach by working with the field staff of community-based organisations (CBOs) and building the capacity of these CBOs.

=== Children and young people ===
Aahung has begun to introduce sexual health education and services into schools, a provision that has otherwise been generally lacking in Pakistan. It has drawn up life skills-based education (LSBE) programmes incorporating sexual and reproductive health, and trained teachers to implement them at both primary and secondary levels. Topics covered include gender discrimination, HIV/AIDS, child marriage and protection from violence. In the process Aahung has worked with religious leaders and institutions. Aahung has succeeded in integrating the LSBE curriculum into public and private schools in Sindh province.

=== Medical education ===
Aahung has integrated sexual health education and services into a range of reproductive health organisations, medical universities and nursing colleges. For example, Aahung has collaborated with Dow University of Karachi on developing a medical education curriculum for trainee medical doctors, incorporating reproductive health education, and inculcating clinical skills in dealing with patients' sexual and reproductive issues in a sensitive and non-judgemental way.

=== Advocacy ===
Aahung has adopted a rights-based approach to address the sexual and reproductive health needs of the people of Pakistan, advocating for increased access to quality sexual and reproductive health information and services. It advocates for improving laws and policies and holding the government accountable to national and international commitments in this arena.

=== Publications ===
Publications of Aahung include: “Preventing Child Sexual Abuse”, “Aware for Life - Facilitator Guide”, “A Care givers' Guide: 'How to Talk to Children and Young People'”, and “Teaching Puberty and Responsible Behaviour”.

== Human Rights Tulip, 2013 ==
In December 2013, Aahung, in the person of its director Sheena Hadi, was presented with the Human Rights Tulip Award by the Netherlands Minister of Foreign Affairs, Frans Timmermans. The Tulip award is presented each year to a global human rights defender or organisation for the promotion and protection of human rights through the use of innovation. In selecting the 2013 winner, special attention was given to human rights defenders working in innovative ways.

Presenting the award on 11 December 2013, Mr Timmermans said: “Aahung owes its success to the ability to give human rights a human face ... Its efforts to promote human rights are not abstract. They involve the people we share our daily lives with and who are part of the local community. They teach men and women of all ages life skills to help them deal with issues like puberty, gender discrimination, HIV/AIDS, peer pressure and family planning. The Aahung method is to engage a wide range of stakeholders, like school teachers, medical staff, religious scholars and parents, to talk about difficult subjects”.

Timmermans added that the award of the Human Rights Tulip to Aahung was more than simply the end of a selection process: it was the start of a long relationship between Aahung and the Netherlands. Aahung would be able to use the €100,000 prize to further develop, innovate and scale up its human rights work, so that more people in as many places as possible would be able to benefit. The Hague Institute for the Internationalisation of Law (HiiL) would work with Aahung to extend the reach of the latter’s successful approach.
