= Ni Yulan =

Chinese human rights activist (born 1960)

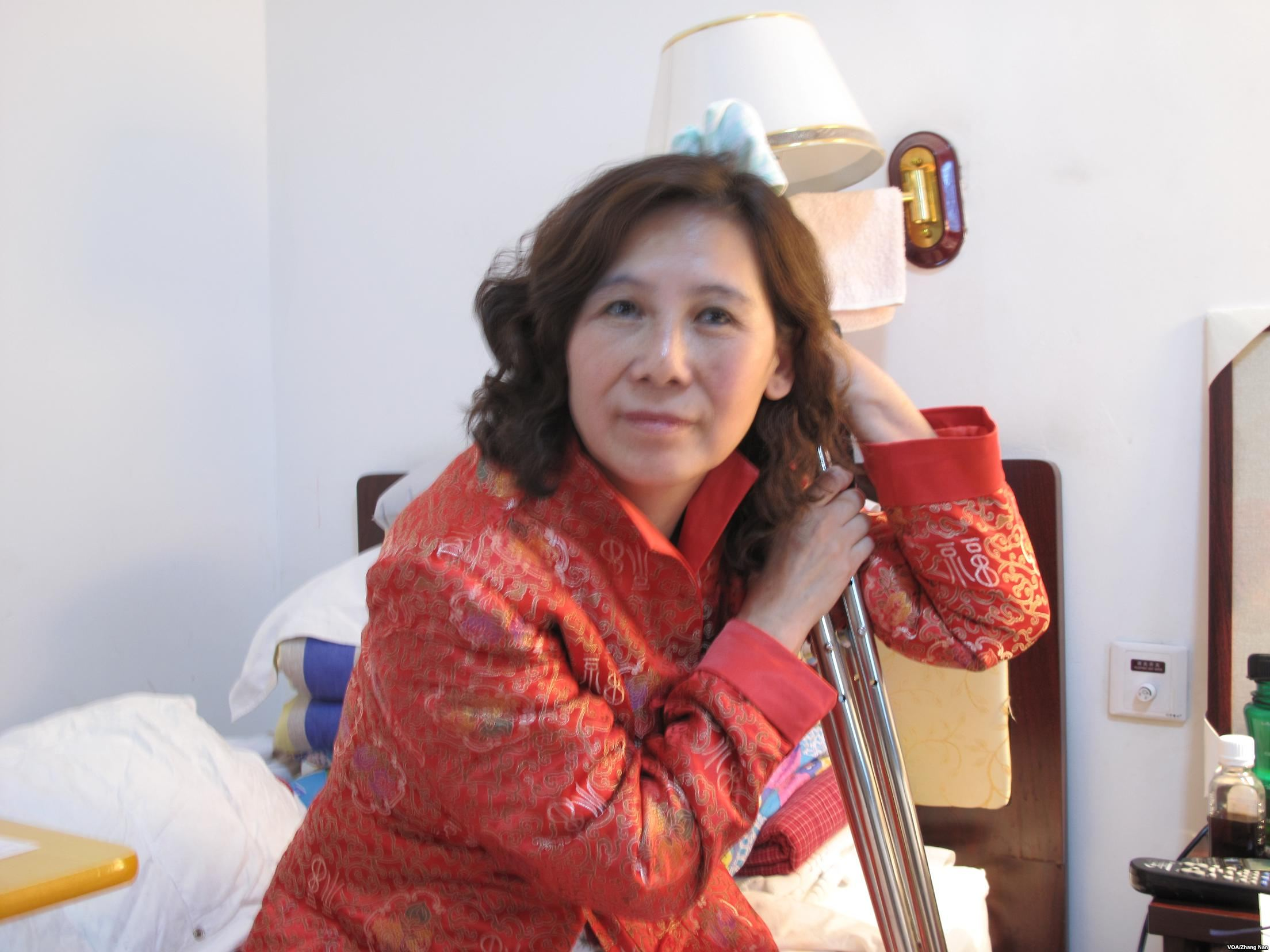
- Born: 24 March 1960 (age 66); Beijing, China
- Known for: Human rights advocacy
- Spouse: Dong Jiqin (董继勤)
- Children: Dong Xuan (董璇, daughter)

Chinese name
- Traditional Chinese: 倪玉蘭
- Simplified Chinese: 倪玉兰
Transcriptions
Standard Mandarin
- Hanyu Pinyin: Ní Yùlán
- IPA: [nǐ ŷ.lǎn]

Ni Yulan (倪玉兰, born 24 March 1960) is a civil rights lawyer in the People's Republic of China. She has established herself in defending human rights in China by providing legal aid to persecuted groups such as Falun Gong practitioners and victims of forced eviction.

Ni has gone through multiple arrests, three prison sentences, and torture following her human rights cases against the Chinese government. Her license to practice law was later revoked by Chinese authorities.

In 2011, the Dutch government awarded Ni the Human Rights Tulip, and in 2016, the United States Department of State gave her the International Women of Courage Award.

== Education and career ==
Ni entered Beijing Language and Culture University in 1978 and obtained a bachelor's degree in Chinese. She went on to obtain a law degree from China University of Political Science and Law, and became a lawyer in 1986. She then worked as a legal consultant at China International Trading Corporation while being simultaneously employed as an attorney at Justice Law Firm.

Ni is said to have been monitored by the Chinese government since 1999, when she provided legal assistance to a Falun Gong practitioner. In 2001, when Ni's neighborhood in Beijing had been slated for mandatory demolition in order to accommodate the upcoming 2008 Beijing Olympics, she helped her neighbors by either attempting to save their homes from being demolished or by demanding equitable compensation.

== Arrests and imprisonment ==
=== First arrest and imprisonment ===
In April 2002, Ni was arrested by the police while filming the forced destruction of a neighbor's home. She was then detained for 75 days. Ni said that during her detention, she was kicked and beaten continuously for 15 hours, consequently leaving her maimed and since then in need of crutches to walk.

Ni was again arrested in September that year while petitioning the Beijing National People's Congress Standing Committee about her having been beaten in police custody. Nonetheless, instead of receiving recompense, she was sentenced to a year in prison for "obstructing official business". Additionally, her lawyer's license was revoked.

In November 2005, before then US president George W. Bush's visit to China, Chinese police warned Ni against leaving her home. Two days later, when she was taking a walk in a park near her home, she was assaulted by unidentified men. However, when she reported the attack to the police, she herself was taken into custody.

=== Second arrest and imprisonment ===
In August 2008, Ni was arrested when her own home was forcibly demolished, and was sentenced to two years in prison for "obstructing official business", the same crime as her first conviction. Her family members were not allowed to visit her during that period. After being released, Ni said that she had been beaten harshly to the point that she could only crawl on the prison floor during her imprisonment. Additionally, according to Ni, she was denied access to the toilet along with having a limited water supply because authorities said that it was punishment for her denial of guilt.

Ni was without a home upon her release. Nevertheless, the police still made it difficult for her when she attempted to rent a hotel room or an apartment. As a result, she and her husband camped in a tent at a park in central Beijing. After drawing significant news media attention, authorities then moved the couple to a hotel room.

=== Third arrest and imprisonment ===
On 7 April 2011, Ni and her husband were detained by police as part of a nationwide crackdown on dissent. Ni described multiple instances of abuse during her detention, including once when an officer urinated on her face, and another taking her crutches away and forcing her to crawl from her cell to the prison workshop.

In Beijing on 29 December 2011, Chinese authorities put Ni Yulan on trial for alleged fraud. Owing to mistreatment during Ni's detention, she was in poor health upon her appearance in court and was propped up on a makeshift bed with an oxygen mask tied to her face. Ni's trial drew many spectators outside the courthouse, as they were denied entry and were surrounded by more than a hundred police officers. According to Radio Free Asia, aside from spectators facing obstacles, a number of Ni's witnesses were also confined to their homes by Chinese police prior to Ni's trial, making them unable to testify for Ni.

In April 2012, Ni was sentenced to two years and eight months in prison for “causing a disturbance” and "fraud". Her husband, Dong Jiqin, was similarly sentenced to two years for "causing a disturbance". However, rights activists argue that the charges were fabricated in order to stifle dissent. Ni completed her third sentence on 5 October 2013. According to Ni, her illness had not been treated during her detention, and she was, as a result, in poor health upon release.

== Continued harassment ==
Since Ni Yulan's release in 2013, she and her family have experienced ongoing human rights abuses, including fraud, surveillance, being followed, and unexpected evictions from their residences by authorities and property managers.

In 2016, Ni was prevented by Chinese authorities from leaving China to attend The US Award Ceremony, where she would have received the International Women of Courage Award. Chinese authorities have repeatedly refused to issue her a passport. Ni speculated that it was because authorities had gotten infuriated by her efforts at drawing social media attention to the cause of detained human rights lawyers in 2015.

Soon after the Chinese government's denial of Ni's passport application, on 2 April 2016, a group of around twenty people forcibly removed her from her home in Beijing and assaulted her husband. Subsequently, the company managing the property told Ni that it had faced pressure from the government's security forces to evict her.

Another incident of harassment occurred in April 2017. In early April 2017, Ni Yulan secured a lease for a new apartment and paid over 40,000 yuan for several months' rent. Shortly after, the landlord notified her that the apartment was part of a restricted housing area, necessitating her departure by 15 April 2017. The landlord also mentioned that only 8,000 yuan of the rent could be returned and indicated that the local police had directed the eviction and partial refund.

On 14 April 2017, Ni's apartment had its windows shattered and the power cut off. On the night of 15 April, several men entered the apartment, seized the family's mobile phones, and forced them into two vans parked outside. The vans drove around the city for several hours. During this time, Ni suffered injuries to her back and ankle, while her husband sustained head and leg injuries. The family was eventually abandoned in an unfamiliar area, with their possessions left on the street after being removed from their apartment.

== Awards ==
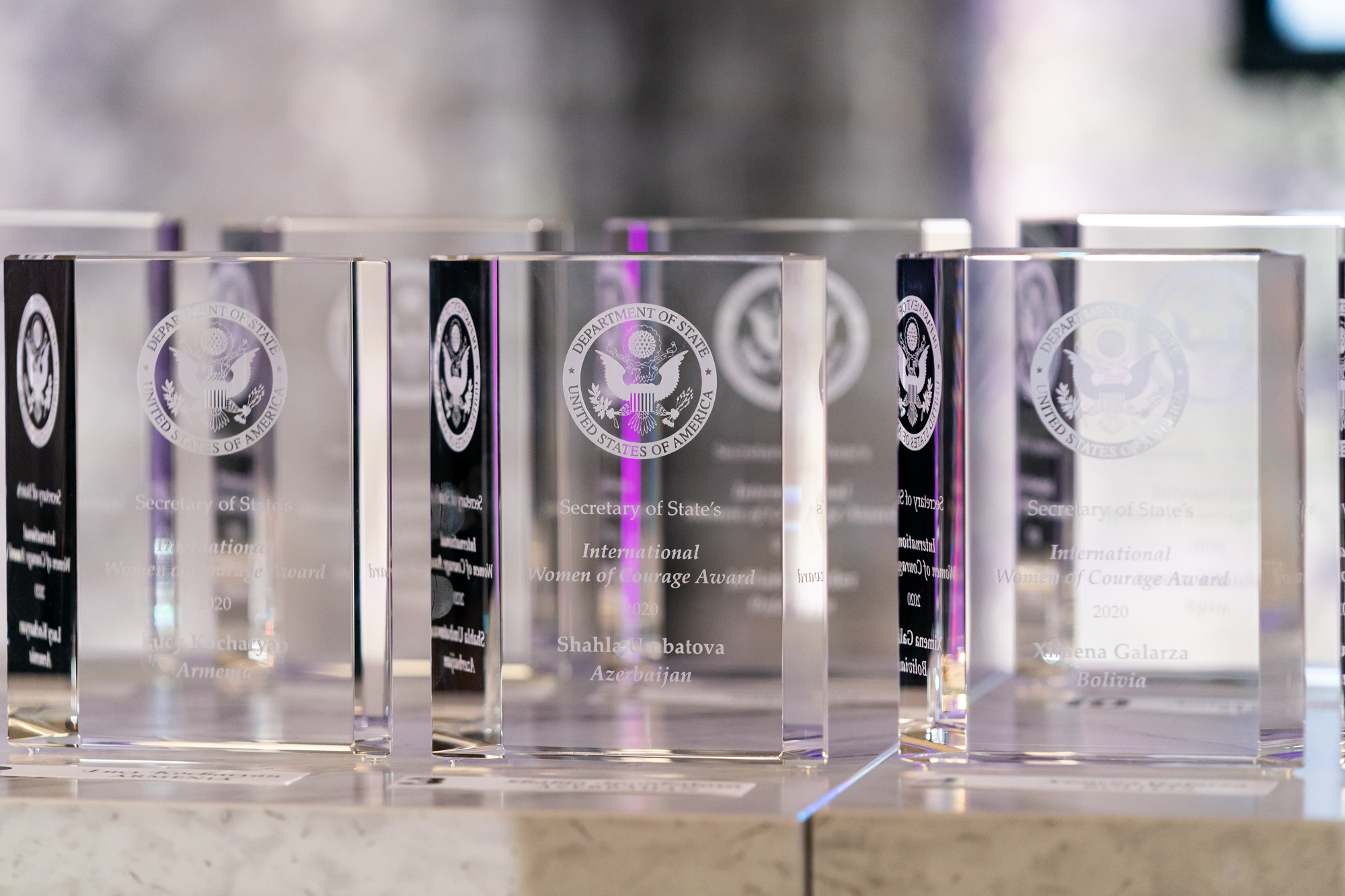
International Women of Courage Awards

In 2011, Ni received the Human Rights Tulip, an annual award presented by the government of the Netherlands. Initially, Ni's daughter had asked for the ceremony to be delayed for two weeks since Ni was facing trial at the time, and it was feared that Ni receiving the award might aggravate her situation in China. However, the ceremony had to be cancelled later since Ni's daughter, who would have represented her mother at the ceremony, was not allowed to leave China.

In 2016, she received the International Women of Courage Award. During the ceremony, which Ni was barred by Chinese authorities from attending, then U.S. secretary of State John Kerry said:

Ni Yulan has paid a steep price for her efforts to assert the legal rights of Chinese citizens. Her outspokenness has led her to imprisonment, during which she was beaten so badly that she became paralyzed from the waist down, but that hasn't stopped her [...] She continues to defend the property rights of Beijing residents whose homes have been slated for demolition.
