= Majal, Barmer =

Mazal मज़ल
- City
- Location in Rajasthan, India Mazal (India)
- Coordinates: 25.81°N 72.70°E
- Country: India
- State: Rajasthan
- District: Balotra

Area
  - Urban: 45 km^{2} (17 sq mi)

Population
  - City: 23,698
  - Density: 96.2/km^{2} (249/sq mi)

Languages
  - Official: Hindi, Marwari
- Time zone: UTC+5:30 (IST)
- PIN: 344021 344029
- ISO 3166 code: RJ-IN
- Vehicle registration: RJ-39

Mazal is a city of Balotra district in Rajasthan, northern India.

Mazal city is a settlement in the east part of Balotra district in the Indian state of Rajasthan. It is south of Luni river. Mazal is connected to three district border s(Pali, Jalor, Jodhpur) and is 55 km west of the city of Jodhpur.

== Demographics ==
In the 2001 census, Majal had a population of 12,598 people (6,880 males and 5,718 females). The city urban area was 45 km^{2} and the population was 23,698.
