= Majal (organization) =

Middle East & North African non-profit social justice organization

- Founded: 2006
- Founder: Esra'a Al Shafei
- Type: Not-for-Profit
- Purpose: freedom of information, access to information, free open-source Internet projects.
- Region served: MENA
- Website: majal.org

Majal is a regional not-for-profit organization focused on "amplifying voices of dissent" throughout the Middle East and North Africa via digital media. Founded in Bahrain, the organization "creates platforms and web applications that promote freedom of expression and social justice."

Majal, which relies on open source platforms, like WordPress and Ruby on Rails, was launched in 2006 by Esra'a Al Shafei as a simple group-blogging idea. However, it has changed course to focus on the development of unique applications and tools.

== Objectives and means ==
Majal's content, in addition to its projects and applications, is free open source content to ensure right to access information for everyone.

The organization uses a broad spectrum of social media tools, ranging from written blogs, podcasts, vlogs, comics, video animation and pictures to live broadcasting through radio.

== Projects and applications ==
Majal runs various active projects that include Alliance for Kurdish Rights, The Muslim Network for Baháʼí Rights, a discussion tool for Arab LGBT youth and various Mobile apps.

== Funding ==
Majal is funded through private donations and grants from non-governmental organizations, as well as any potential revenues earned through freelance development. Its primary funders are the Shuttleworth Foundation and the Omidyar Network.

In 2008, Majal won the Berkman Award from the Berkman Klein Center for Internet & Society at Harvard University in the Human Rights/Global Advocacy category. This $10,000 award was Majal’s first source of funding. This award is presented to “people or institutions that have made a significant contribution to the Internet and its impact on society over the past decade.” In 2009, the March 18 Movement, a project of Majal, received the Think Social Award, which demonstrates how social media can be used to solve the world’s problems. Esra'a Al-Shafei was named a 2009 Echoing Green Fellow for Civil and Human Rights, a seed funding award for young entrepreneurs engaged in social change. Financially, the fellowship consists of a $60,000 stipend paid over two years. Most recently, MEY has received a grant from the Arab Fund for Arts and Culture for its Mideast Tunes website.

== Awards ==
- Winner of Human Rights Tulip 2014 Human Rights Tulip - Human rights - Government.nl
- Ashoka Changemakers Citizen Media competition in 2011 for their CrowdVoice project.
- Monaco Media Prize 2011 for Majal founder and director Esra'a Al Shafei in 2011.
- The BOBS Special Topic Human Rights award in 2011 for the Majal website Migrant Rights.
- ThinkSocial Award in 2009, as powerful model for how social media can be used to address global problems.
- Echoing Green, 2009 Fellowship.
- TEDGlobal 2009 Fellowship.
- Berkman Award for Internet Innovation from Berkman Klein Center for Internet & Society at Harvard Law School in 2008 for the outstanding contributions to the internet and its impact on society.
- The Global Journal selected Majal as one of the Top 100 NGOs in 2013.
- 2013-2014 Shuttleworth Foundation Fellowship.

== Leadership ==
Majal team is led primarily by women. The organization was founded by Esra'a Al Shafei, a blogger from Bahrain in 2006. Ahmed Zidan of Egypt has served for over three years as the Editor-in-Chief of Majal Arabic, and is the co-founder of Ahwaa, and is also a podcaster. Other team members include Mona Kareem, Rima Kalush, Abir Ghattas, Namita Malhotra, and Vani Saraswathi.

== 2011 Middle East and North Africa protests ==
Blogs and video played a role in the documentation of protests throughout the Middle East and North Africa during 2010-2011, also known as the Arab Spring. During this period, MEY's project, CrowdVoice (launched in 2010) helped curate and archive the large amounts of videos, images, and eye-witness reports being aggregated and crowdsourced from across the region. As a result, it had been censored temporarily in Yemen and is still censored in Bahrain.

== Media coverage ==
Majal claims to have received various coverage from news agencies, TV satellite channels, radio stations, newspapers, magazines. For instance, Sky News, CNN, New York Times, BBC, The Guardian, NPR, Time, MTV political blog "Act", VH1, Daily Telegraph, Die Zeit, Frankfurter Rundschau FR-online, Toronto Star, TechCrunch, Rolling Stone Middle East, Abu Dhabi TV, Gulf News, Al-Hasnaa' magazine, ReadWriteWeb, Mashable, The Next Web, Radio Sawt Beirut International, Radio Farda among many others.
