= Corbould =

Corbould is a surname. Notable people with the surname include:

- Chris Corbould (born 1958), British special effects coordinator
- Edward Henry Corbould (1815–1905), British artist
- Henry Corbould (1787–1844), English artist
- Linda Corbould, Royal Australian Air Force officer
- Gordon Edward Corbould (1847–1926), Canadian lawyer and politician
- Richard Corbould (1757–1831), English artist
- Paul Corbould, British special effects supervisor
