= Wyburd =

Wyburd is a British surname. Notable people with the surname include:

- Francis John Wyburd (1826–1909), British artist
- Leonard Wyburd (1865–1958), British painter, interior designer, and furniture designer
