= Elvina Mary Corbould =

British textile artist and writer

- Born: April 27, 1849; Islington
- Died: October 6, 1936; Bath
- Father: Henry Heath Corbould
- Relatives: Walter Edward Corbould

Elvina Mary Corbould (27 April 1849 – 6 October 1936) was a British writer and textile artist.

Elvina Mary Corbould was born on 27 April 1849 in Islington, the daughter of Dr. Henry Heath Corbould and Ann Ker Corbould. She was from the Corbould family of artists and her paternal grandfather was Henry Corbould. Her brother was the artist Walter Edward Corbould.

Corbould wrote a novel, Sweet Little Rogues (1876), and with Louise Rossi wrote Side-Lights on Shakspere (1897), a book on the works of William Shakespeare aimed at general readers and students. Under the name E. M. C. she published numerous books on knitting, including The Lady's Knitting Book (1874) and The Knitting Teacher’s Assistant (1877), the latter of which was the most recent edition of a fifty-year old handbook for national schools.

In 1882 she married Dr. Mark Anthony Robinson, who died in 1911. Elvina Mary Corbould died on 6 October 1936 in Bath.

== Bibliography ==
- The Lady's Crochet-Book. 1874.
- The Lady's Knitting Book. London: Hatchards, 1874 and New York: Anson D. F. Randolph and Co., 1879.
- The Lady's Netting-Book. London: Hatchards, 1876.
- The Lady's Work Book. London: Hatchards, 1876.
- Sweet Little Rogues: A Child's Story. 1 vol. London: Hatchards, 1876.
- The Knitting Teacher’s Assistant: Designed for Use of National Girls’ Schools. London, 1877.
- The Lady's Crewel Embroidery Book. London: Hatchards, 1878.
- Embroidery and Art Needlework Designs. London: Hatchards, 1879.
- The Knitter's Note Book. 1890.
- (with Louise Rossi) Side-Lights on Shakspere [sic]. London: Swan Sonnerschein, 1897.
