= Rosslyn Tower =

House in Putney, London, England

Coordinates: 51.459907°N 0.217048°W

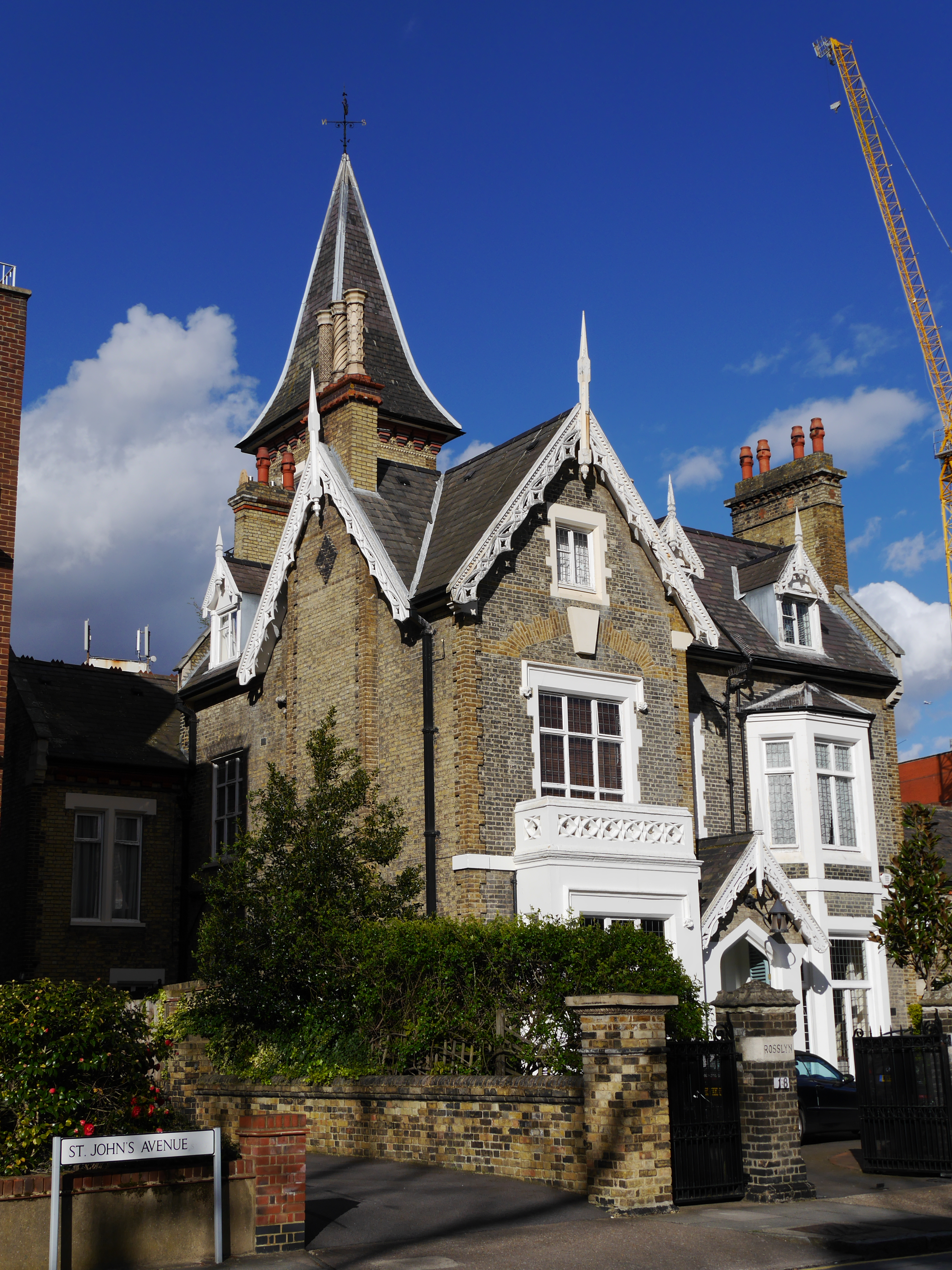
streetview of Rosslyn Tower, Putney

Rosslyn Tower is Grade II listed private house in Putney in the London Borough of Wandsworth.

== Location ==
The building is on the north side St John's Avenue in Putney SW15 at number 18, east of Putney Hill.

== Building ==
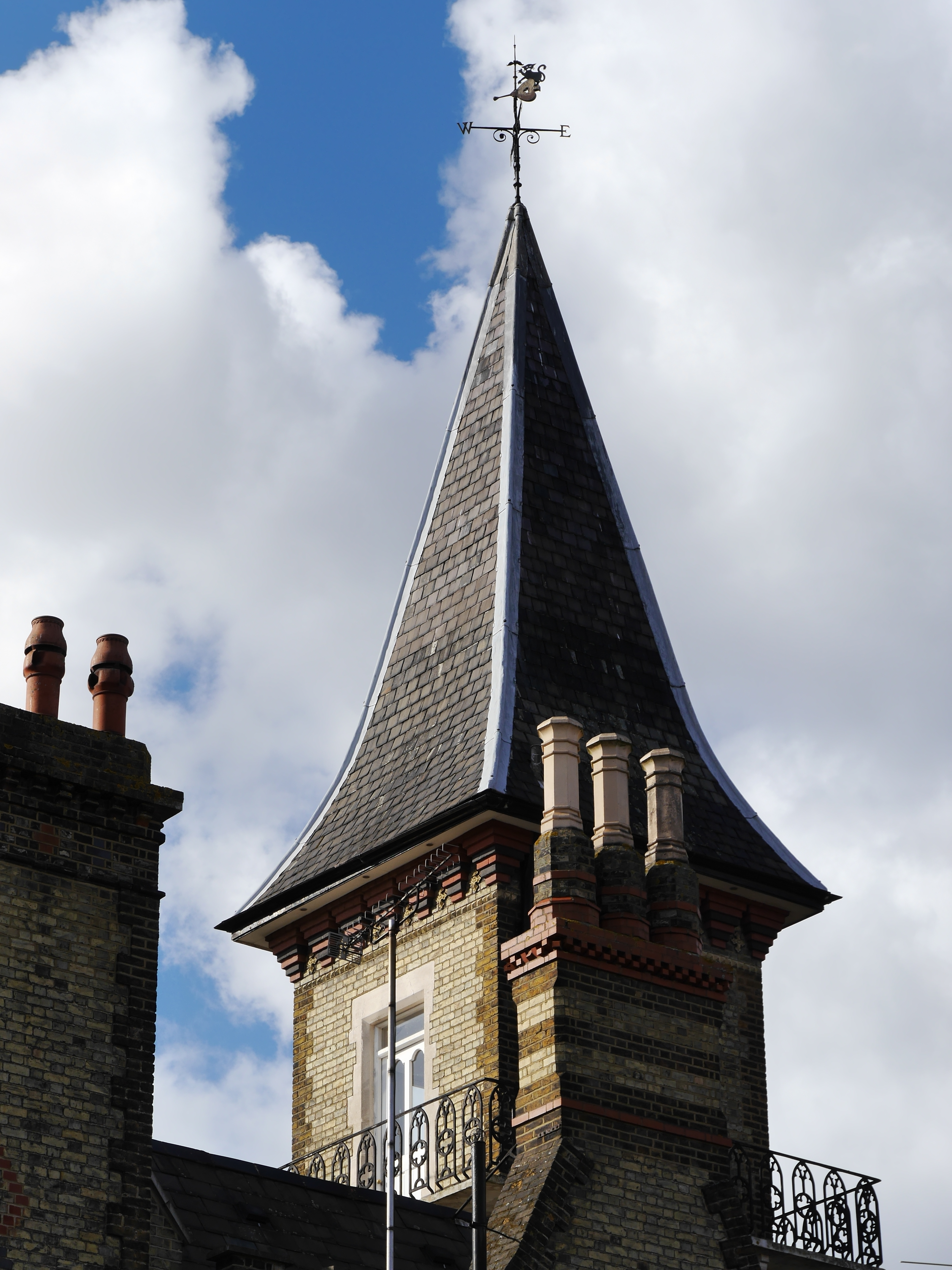
the tower of Rosslyn Tower, Putney

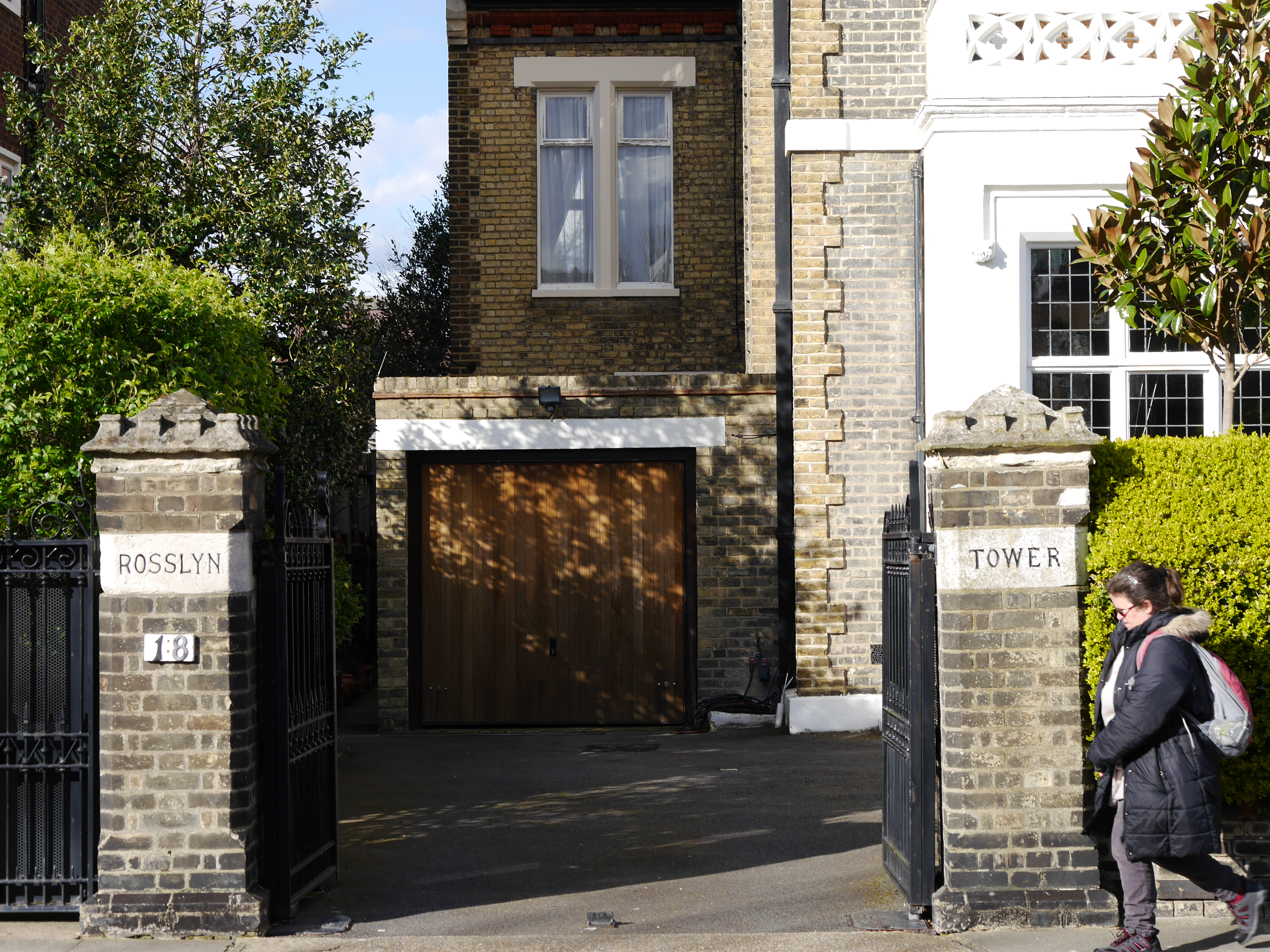
gateway of Rosslyn Tower, Putney

The building was built in the 1870s, is made of brick and stone, is double fronted and has two storeys. There are eight bedrooms and the tower has four storeys, with a balcony with 360 degree views of London and a view of the University Boat Race There is a 110-foot garden with a lily pond and rose garden.

The building has a drawing room which was redesigned in 1907 by Leonard Wyburd RA (1865–1958) one of Britain's leading Arts & Crafts furniture designers and who led Liberty's design studio after being appointed aged just 18.

The building was Grade II listed on 5 July 1974.

== Residents ==
The house was commissioned by the Miles family and passed from Alfred Webb Miles, a pioneer of ready-made clothing, in 1903 to his daughters Emma Jessie Blanche and Elma Grace Miles, who lived in the house until Grace's death in 1956, and who also donated land elsewhere in Putney for the building of St Mary's Hall (now Hotham Hall) to St Mary's Church. A Miles Trust still exists to help fund aspects of community life in Putney.

In the 70s, 80s and 90s it was owned and occupied by Dr Bruce MacGillivray (Dean of the Royal Free Hospital Medical School) and his wife Dr Ruth MacGillivray.

In the late 1990s the trance music DJ Paul Oakenfold owned the property and stored a large number of records in the basement, Oakenfold had bought the house at auction from his DJ friend Nicky Holloway.

== Value ==
The building was valued at £1.25 million in 1997 and 20 years later in 2017 it was valued at £5 million.
