= Francis John Wyburd =

Francis John Wyburd (1826–1909) was a British artist.

Wyburd was born in 1826 in Bryanston Street, London, and lived there for at least the next fifty years.

Wyburd was educated in Lille, France, after which he was a pupil of Thomas Fairland.

He married Jemima Wyburd, née Corbould (1840–1913), the daughter of Edward Henry Corbould, who was appointed "instructor of historical painting to the royal family" from 1851 and taught Queen Victoria and her family painting and drawing.

Their son Leonard Wyburd RA (1865–1958) was a painter, interior designer and furniture designer. He was broadly part of the Arts & Crafts movement, and the head of Liberty's Furnishing and Decoration Studio from its foundation in 1883 until he left in 1903.
