= Leonard Wyburd =

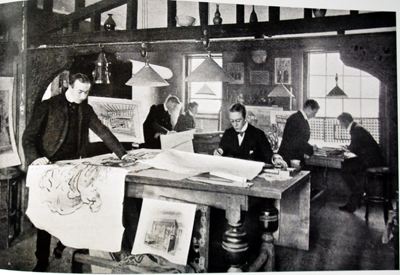
The Liberty Design Studio, The Art Journal, 1900

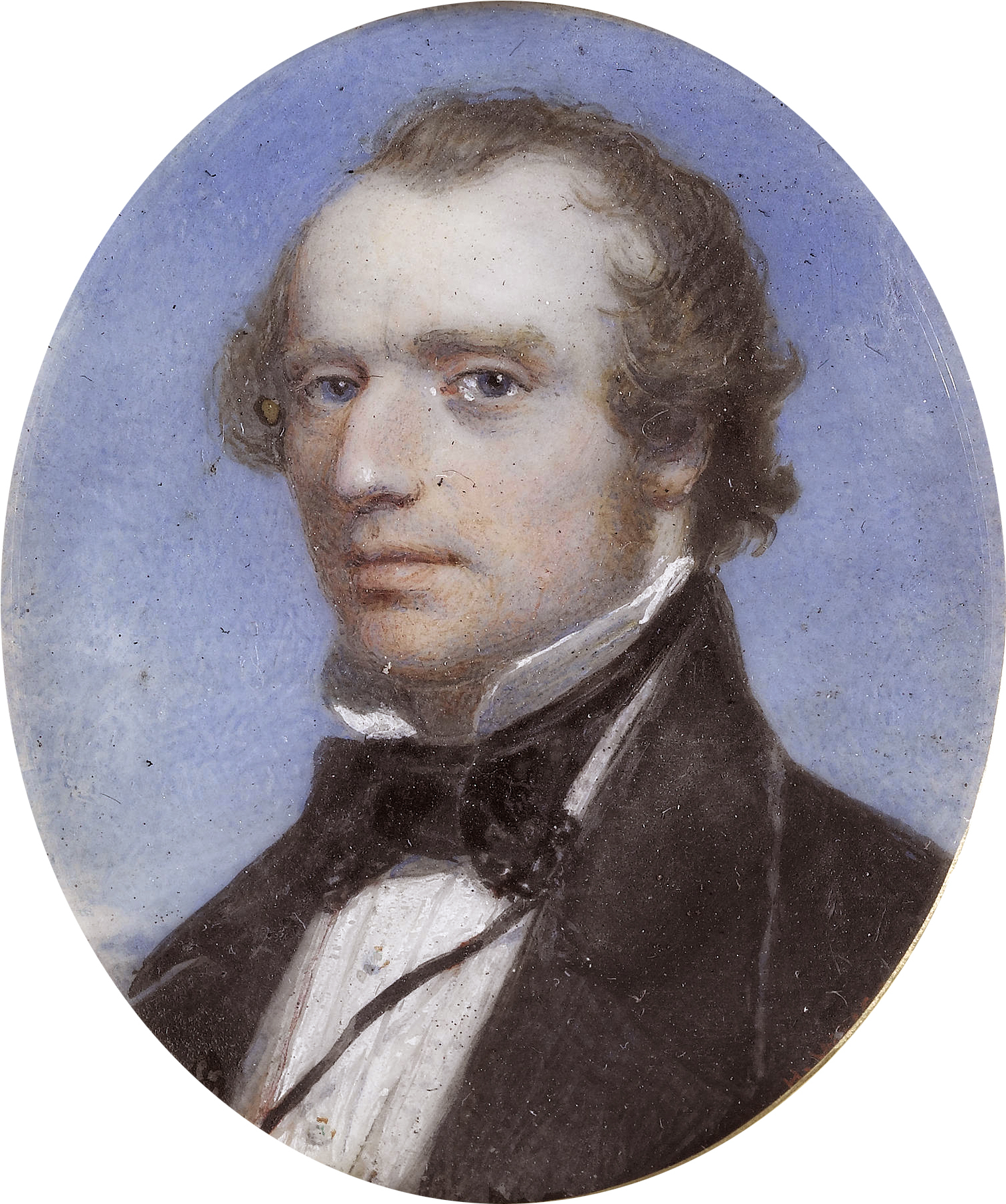
Wyburd's grandfather, Edward Corbould (1815–1905)

Wyburd's design for Riverside House, 1904

Leonard Francis Wyburd RA (12 June 1865 – 17 January 1958) was a British painter, interior designer and furniture designer. He was broadly part of the Arts & Crafts movement, and the head of Liberty's Furnishing and Decoration Studio from its foundation in 1883 until he left in 1903.

== Early life ==
Wyburd was the son of the painter Francis John Wyburd (1829–1909) and Jemima Wyburd, née Corbould (1840–1913). His grandfather Edward Henry Corbould was appointed "instructor of historical painting to the royal family" from 1851 and taught Queen Victoria and her family painting and drawing.

== Career ==
Liberty, under its founder, Arthur Lasenby Liberty, opened a store in London's Regent Street in 1875, and was already known for its fabrics and imported Asian furniture. In 1883, it established a "Furnishing and Decoration Studio" under the direction of Wyburd, then aged only 18. Wyburd's Spanish Moorish and Arab-influenced furniture designs proved to be both fashionable and popular.

By the late 1890s, Wyburd was at the forefront of European furniture design, combining elements of Art and Crafts, Art Nouveau and other medieval English allusions. Liberty furniture was typically of solid oak or mahogany, well yet simply made, sometimes with small cut-outs, stained glass insets or elaborate beaten copper hinges. Wyburd's designs were often given Saxon or Scottish names. One was the Athelstan chair, of around 1899.

The Liberty Studio closed in 1905, but Wyburd had already left in 1903 to establish his own Wigmore Street studio in London. His later commissions included redesigning the drawing room at Rosslyn Tower, St John's Avenue, Putney, London. He also created a design for an interior at Riverside House in 1904 which featured a selection of typical Arts and Crafts furniture. It has been said that but for his apparent reluctance to seek recognition for his work, he might today have the same level of recognition as Charles Voysey and Baillie Scott.

In later life, Wyburd was a London antique dealer, which trade he carried on for many years.

== Personal life ==
On 14 July 1900, Wyburd married Eleanor Oldershaw Bathurst (1876–1976), at St Mary Abbots, Kensington, London. They had two sons, Henry Neville Corbould Wyburd (1901–1960) and Derek Bathurst Wyburd (1904–1992).
