= Edward Henry Corbould =

British painter (1815–1905)

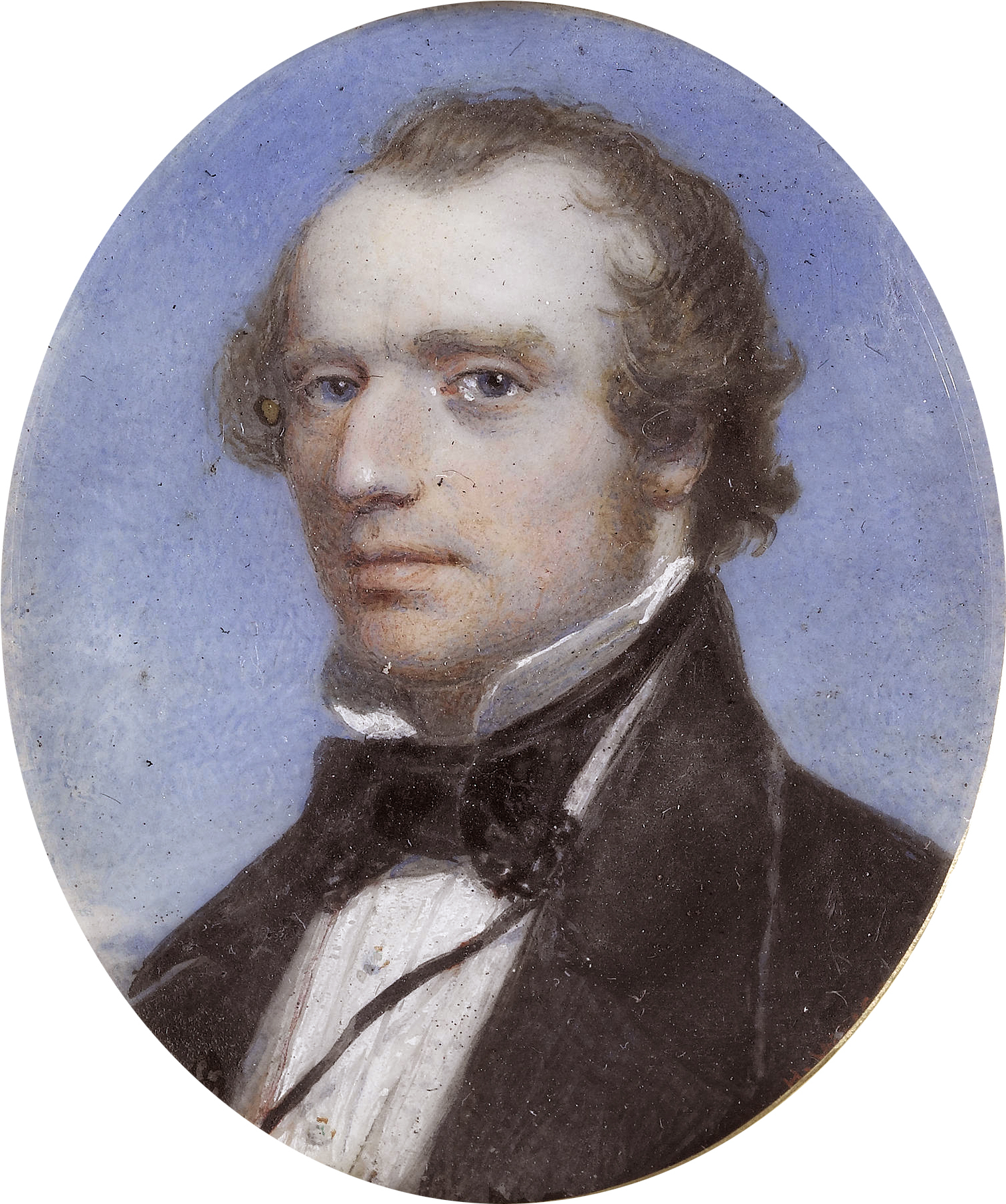
- Edward Henry Corbould (Henry Weigall Jr., 1850)
- Born: 5 December 1815
- Died: 18 January 1905 (aged 89)
- Occupation: artist
- Spouses: Fanny Jemima (m. 1839; died 1850) Anne Middleton Wilson (m. 1851; died 1866) Anne Melis Sanders (m. 1868)
- Children: 7
- Father: Henry Corbould
- Relatives: Richard Corbould (grandfather)

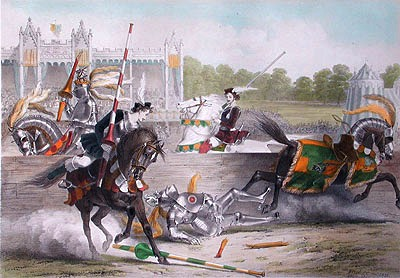
E. H. Corbould: The Lord of The Tournament and The Knight of The Red Rose

Edward Henry Corbould, R.I. (5 December 1815 in London – 18 January 1905 in London) was a British artist, noted as a historical painter and watercolourist.

== Life ==
Born in London, he was son of Henry Corbould and grandson of Richard Corbould, both painters. He was a pupil of Henry Sass, and a student at the Royal Academy Schools. In 1842 his watercolour of The Woman taken in Adultery was purchased by Albert, Prince Consort. Nine years later, he was appointed instructor of historical painting to the Royal Family. He continued to teach its members for twenty-one years.

Corbould married three times:

1. On 28 September 1839 to Fanny Jemima (died 1850), daughter of the engraver Charles Heath and his wife. They had three daughters, one of whom, Isabel Fanny (Mrs. G. H. Heywood), had two daughters who became artists, Mrs. Eveline Corbould-Ellis and Mrs. Weatherley;
2. On 7 August 1851 to Anne Middleton Wilson (died 1866), by whom he had two sons, Ridley Edward Arthur Lamothe (1854–1887) and Victor Albert Louis Edward (born 1866); and
3. On 15 January 1868 to Anne Melis Sanders, by whom he had one son and one daughter.

Corbould died at Kensington on 18 January 1905. He has a memorial tablet in St Mary Abbots church in Kensington, London. A grandson Leonard Wyburd became a noted designer.

== Works ==
In 1834, 1835, and 1836 Corbould won gold medals of the Society of Arts, in 1834 with a watercolour of the Fall of Phaethon, and in the last two years with models of St. George and the Dragon and a Chariot Race, from Homer. His first exhibits in the Royal Academy in 1835 included a model (Cyllarus and Hylonome); and he submitted designs for four pieces of sculpture for Blackfriars Bridge.

Corbould was known for his water-colours, in which he produced subjects illustrating literature (mainly from Chaucer, Spenser, and Shakespeare), history, and daily life. A few of his pictures are in oils (e.g. The Canterbury Pilgrims, 1874). He started exhibiting at the New Water Colour Society in 1837, becoming a member in the same year. His early exhibits included The Canterbury Pilgrims assembled at the old Tabard Inn. Many of his works were acquired by Queen Victoria, Prince Albert, and his royal pupils, including an illustration of Alfred Tennyson's Morte d'Arthur presented by Queen Victoria to Princess Louise, and Henry VI welcomed to London after his Coronation in Paris, and The Iconoclasts of Basle, acquired by the Empress Frederick for the imperial collection in Berlin.

Apart from the royal collections, one of the largest collections of his works was that of George Strutt of Belper. A watercolour Lady Godiva went to the National Gallery of New South Wales.

Corbould exhibited in all about 250 drawings at the Royal Institute, retiring from active membership in 1898. He also produced designs for book illustration: in the Abbotsford edition of the Waverley Novels (Cadell, 1841–6), and in A & C Black's edition of the same works (1852–3); Spenser's Faerie Queene and Chaucer's Canterbury Tales (Routledge, 1853); Martin Farquhar Tupper's Proverbial Philosophy (1854); and Robert Aris Willmott's Poets of the Nineteenth Century (1857), and Merrie Days of England (1858–9). He worked for periodicals such as London Society, the Churchman's Family Magazine, Cassell's Magazine, and the Illustrated London News.

Prints after his paintings included:

- The Canterbury Pilgrims assembled at the old Tabard Inn (mezzotint by C. E. Wagstaff, 1843);
- Henry VI welcomed to London after his Coronation (engraved by E. Webb, 1847);
- My Chickens for Sale (1847), Maid of the Mill (1849), and Valentine's Eve (1850) (mezzotints by Samuel Bellin);
- Happy as a Queen (1852), and The Wood Nymph (mezzotints by W. H. Egleton, 1855);
- The Fairy Well (mezzotint by J. E. Coombs, 1855);
- Lady Godiva (mezzotint by J. J. Chant, 1860);
- The Queen of the Tournament (mezzotint by T. W. Huffam);
- The Plague of London (one of the Westminster Hall Cartoons, lithograph by Frank Howard);
- portrait of the Prince Consort (lithograph by Richard James Lane, 1862).

== Gallery ==
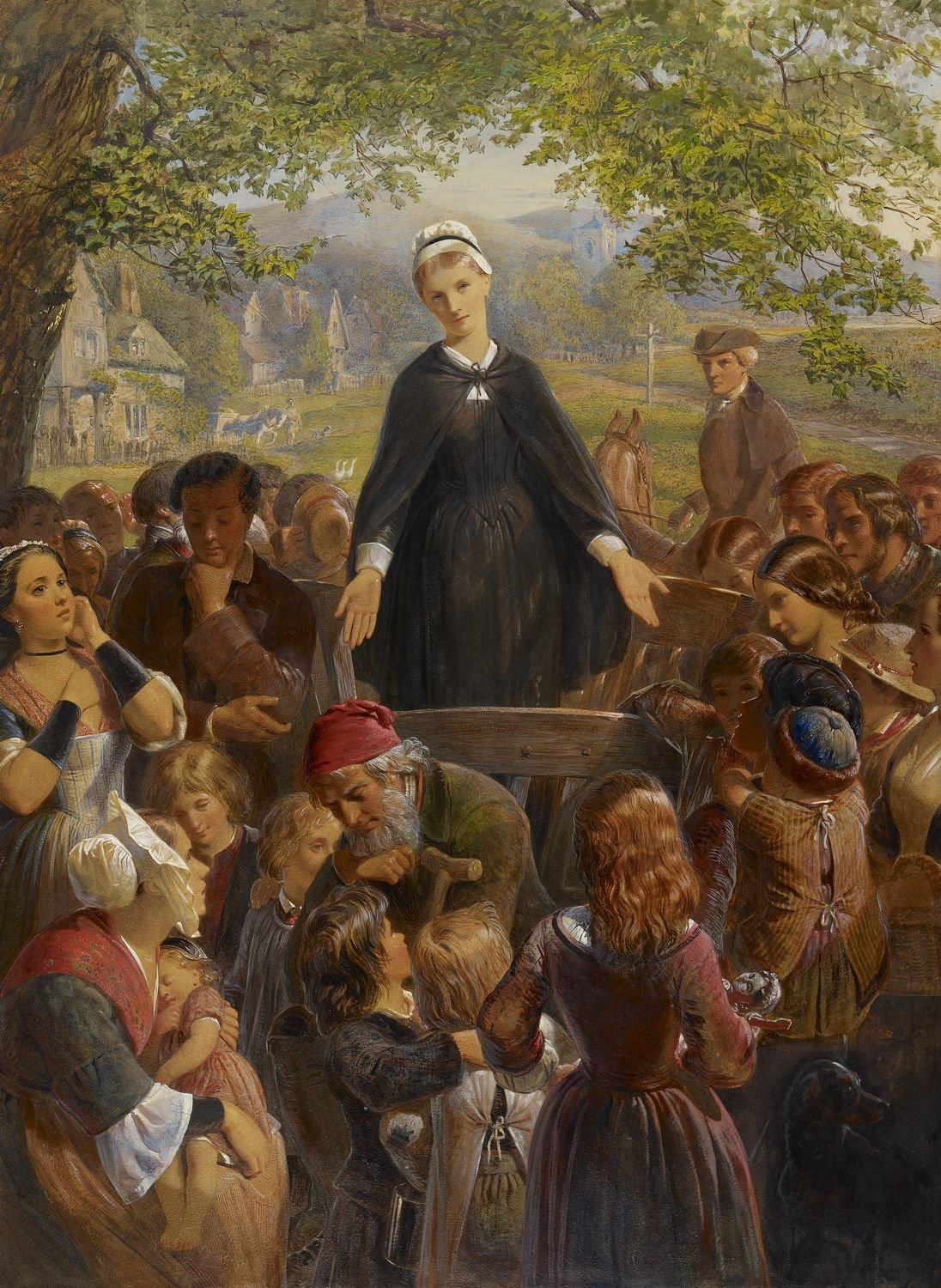
Dinah Morris preaching on the common

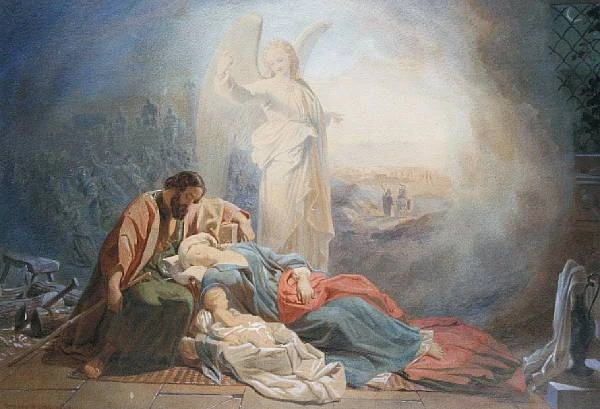
The story of the young Christ

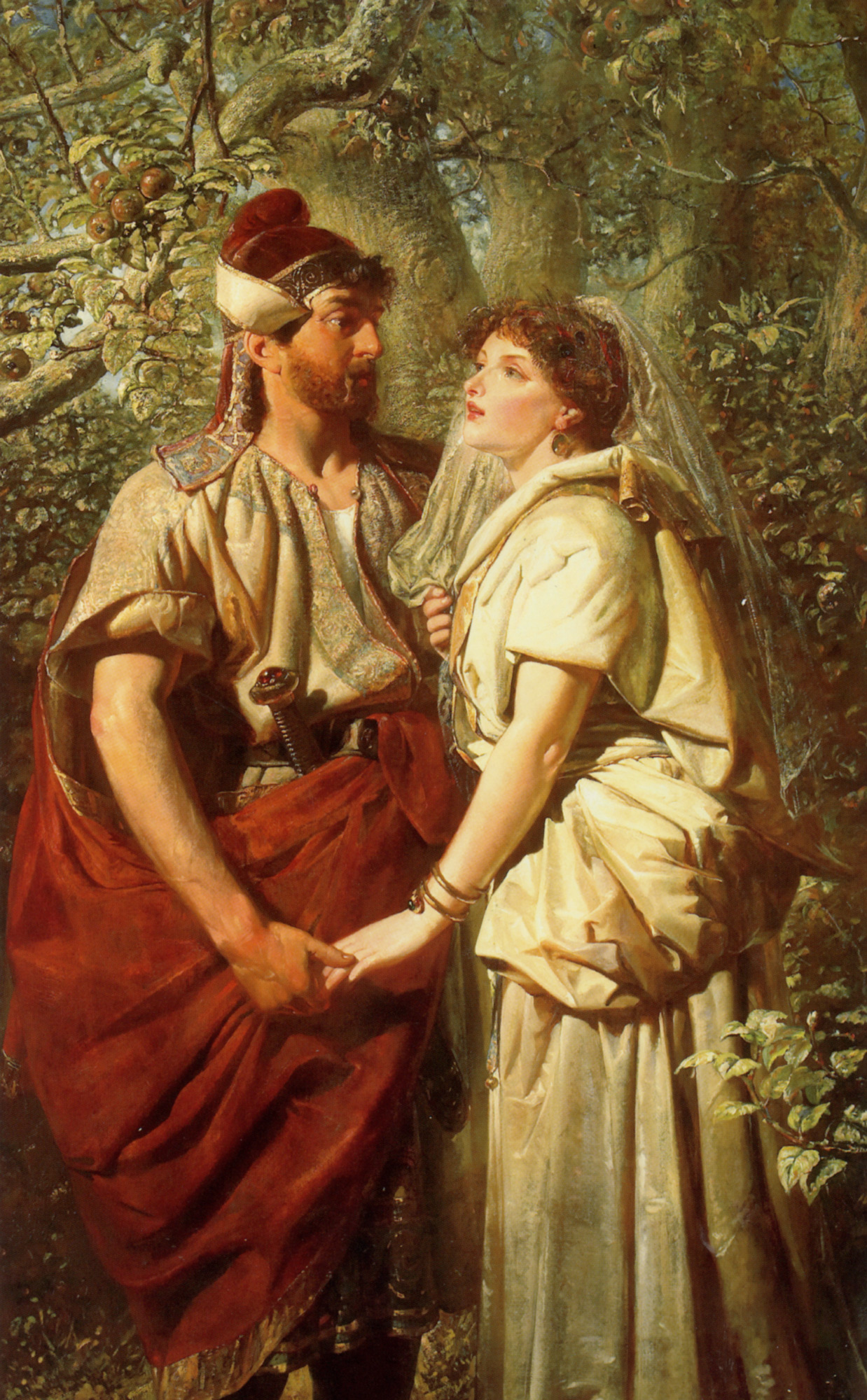
Troilus and Cressida in the Garden of Pandarus

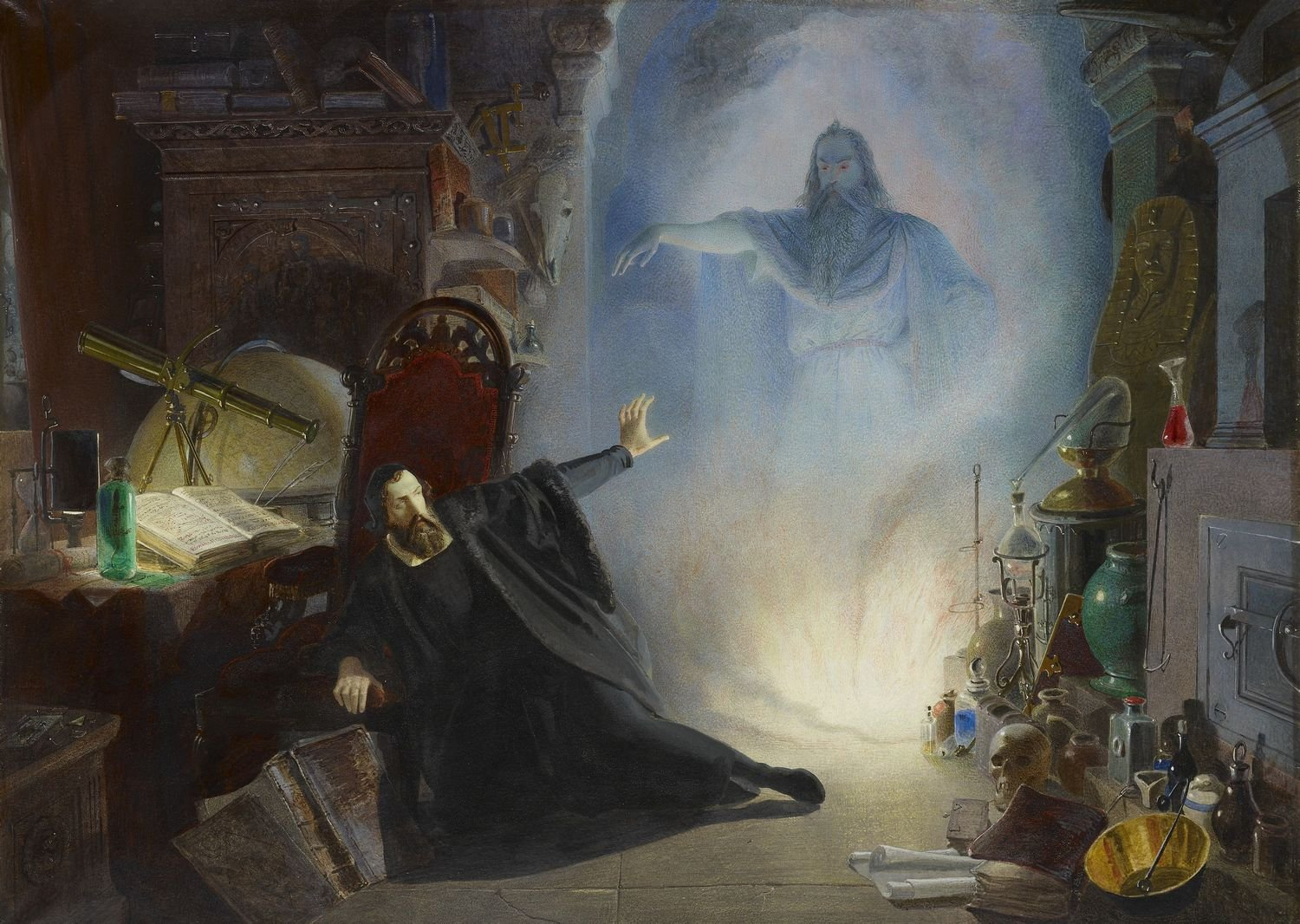
The appearance of the Spirit of the Earth from Goethe's Faust

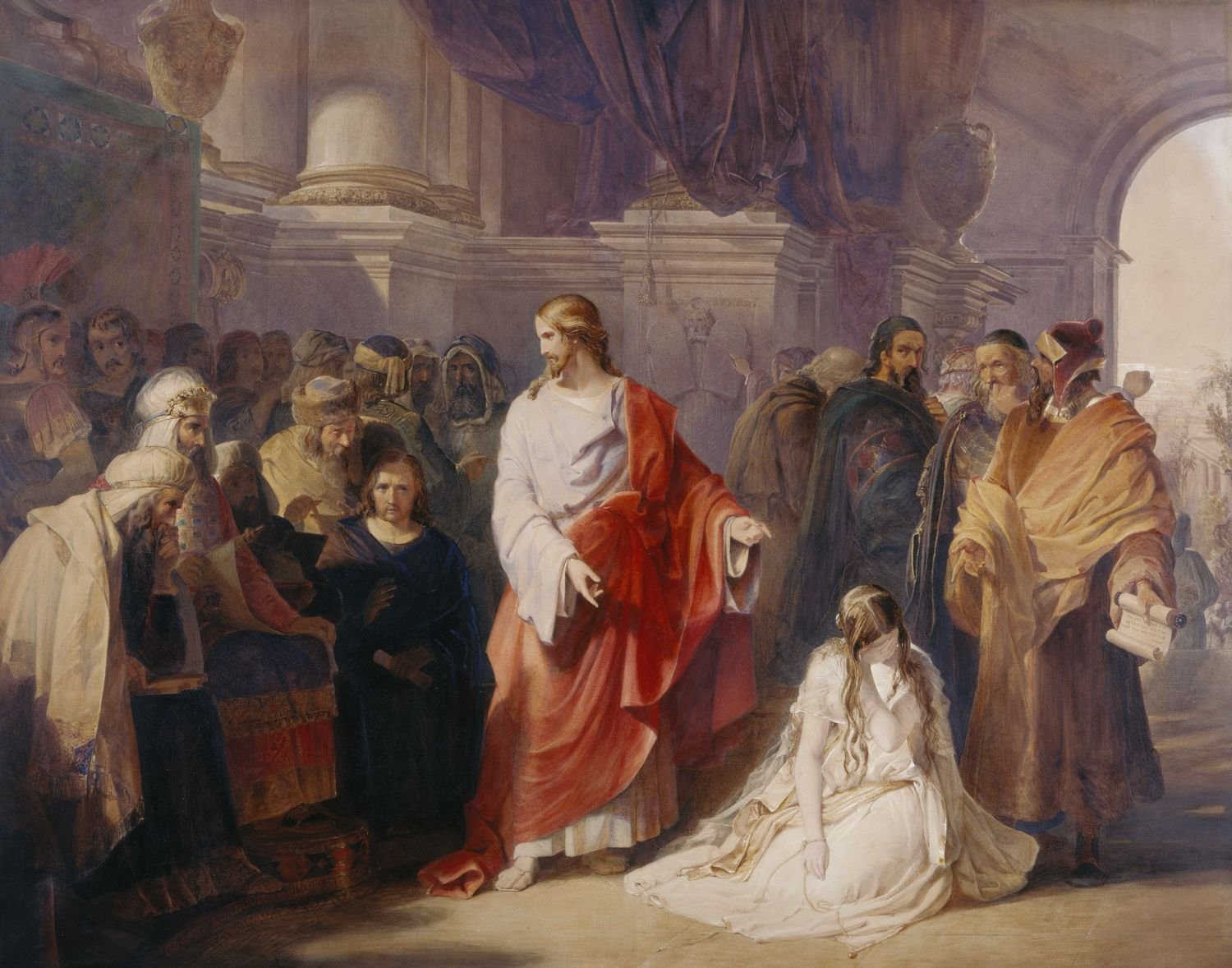
The Woman taken in Adultery

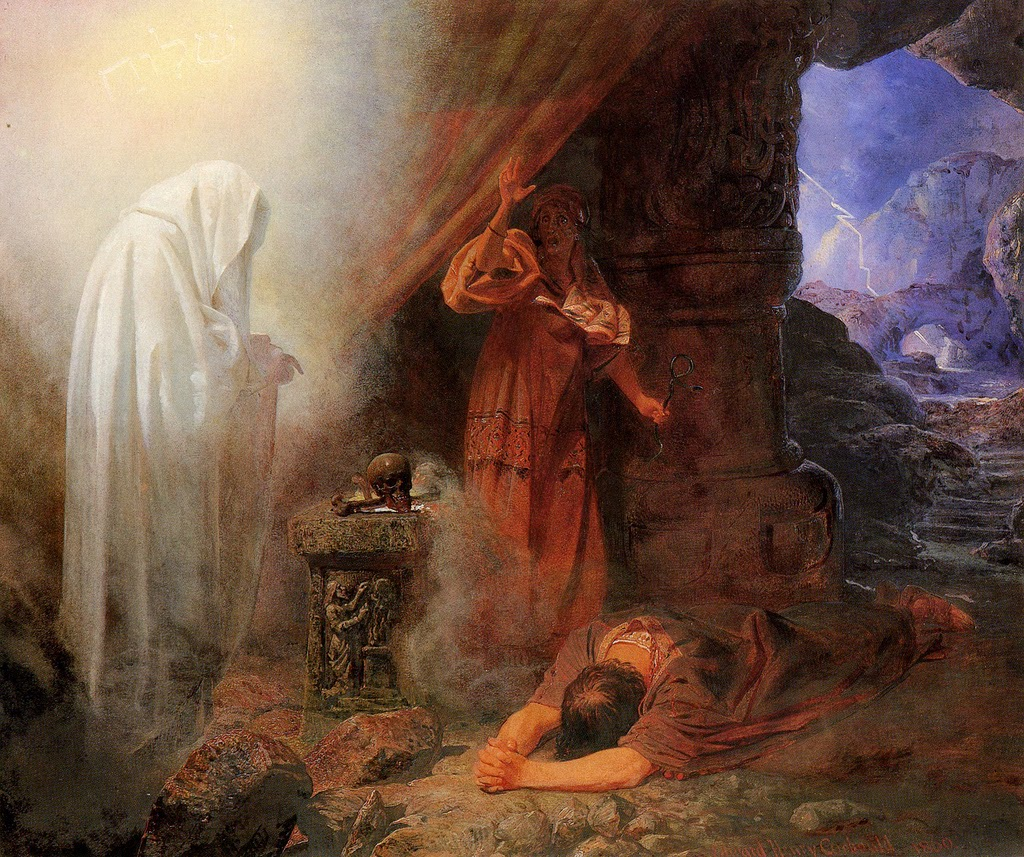
Saul and the Witch of Endor

== References and sources ==
References

- NGC staff (2011), Henry Corbould 1815–1905, National Gallery of Canada Edward
- Jack at www.corbould.com (8 November 2011), Artist: Edward Henry Corbould b. London 1815 d. London 1905, corbould.com

Sources

- Arthur Mayger Hind (1912). "Corbould, Edward Henry" . In Lee, Sidney (ed.). Dictionary of National Biography (2nd supplement). Vol. 1. London: Smith, Elder & Co.
