= Henry Corbould =

British painter

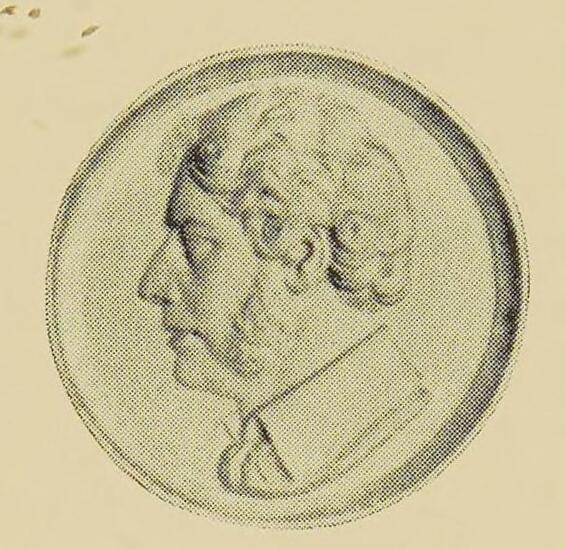
- bas-relief by Edward Henry Corbould
- Born: 11 August 1787; London
- Died: 9 December 1844 (aged 57); Robertsbridge
- Occupation: Painter, drawer, graphic artist
- Children: Edward Henry Corbould

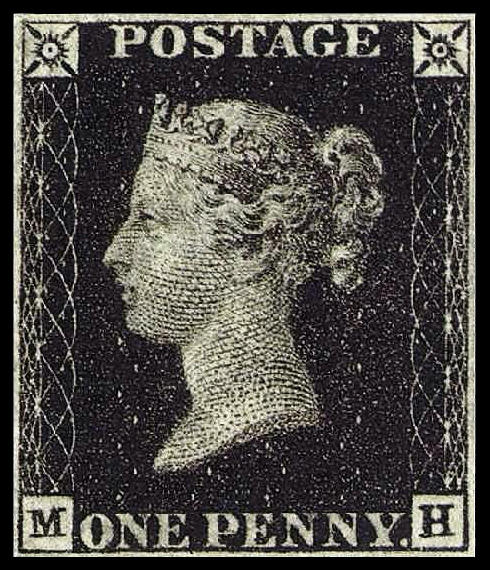
Queen Victoria's image on the Penny Black, the world's first adhesive postage stamp, was based on a sketch by Corbould.

Henry Corbould (11 August 1787 – 9 December 1844) was an English artist and draughtsman.

== Life ==
Henry Corbould was born in London, on the 11 August 1787. He was the third son of Richard Corbould and Charlotte Phillipson. He studied painting with his father, and was at an early age admitted as a student of the Royal Academy, under Fuseli, where he gained the silver medal for a study from the life. While at the Academy he made the friendship of Flaxman, Stothard, West, Chantrey, and Westmacott. He several times sat as a model to West in whose picture of 'Christ Rejected' his head was painted for that of St. John; as also in that of 'Christ Healing the Sick in the Temple,' in the National Gallery. In 1808 he exhibited a painting of 'Coriolanus'; in the following year 'The Parting of Hector and Andromache,' and 'Thetis comforting Achilles,' &c.; but his name has been comparatively little before the public except as a designer for books, his time having been almost entirely occupied in making drawings from ancient marbles in the possession of various English noblemen. Those of the Woburn Abbey Marbles, made for the Duke of Bedford, were engraved, but only circulated among a few of his Grace's private friends. This was also the case with those executed for the Earl of Egremont.

The collection of Ancient Marbles in the British Museum, on which he was engaged for about thirty years, was in course of publication at the time of his death. He was also occasionally employed in making drawings for the Dilettanti and Antiquarian Societies, of which he was a member. He was devotedly attached to art, and was surpassed by few in professional knowledge; no painter of his time was more thoroughly acquainted with drawing; and his copies from the antique may be referred to as models of accuracy and truth. Nor was he by any means without fancy and invention: some of his book illustrations are among the most graceful and effective productions of the age; and few designers ever more completely entered into the spirit of the author.

Corbould died at Robertsbridge, on 9 December 1844, of an attack of apoplexy, supposed to have been brought on by exposure to cold.

His son Edward Henry Corbould was also an artist.
