= Hotham Hall, Putney =

Historic building in the United kingdom

Coordinates: 51.4648°N 0.2220°W

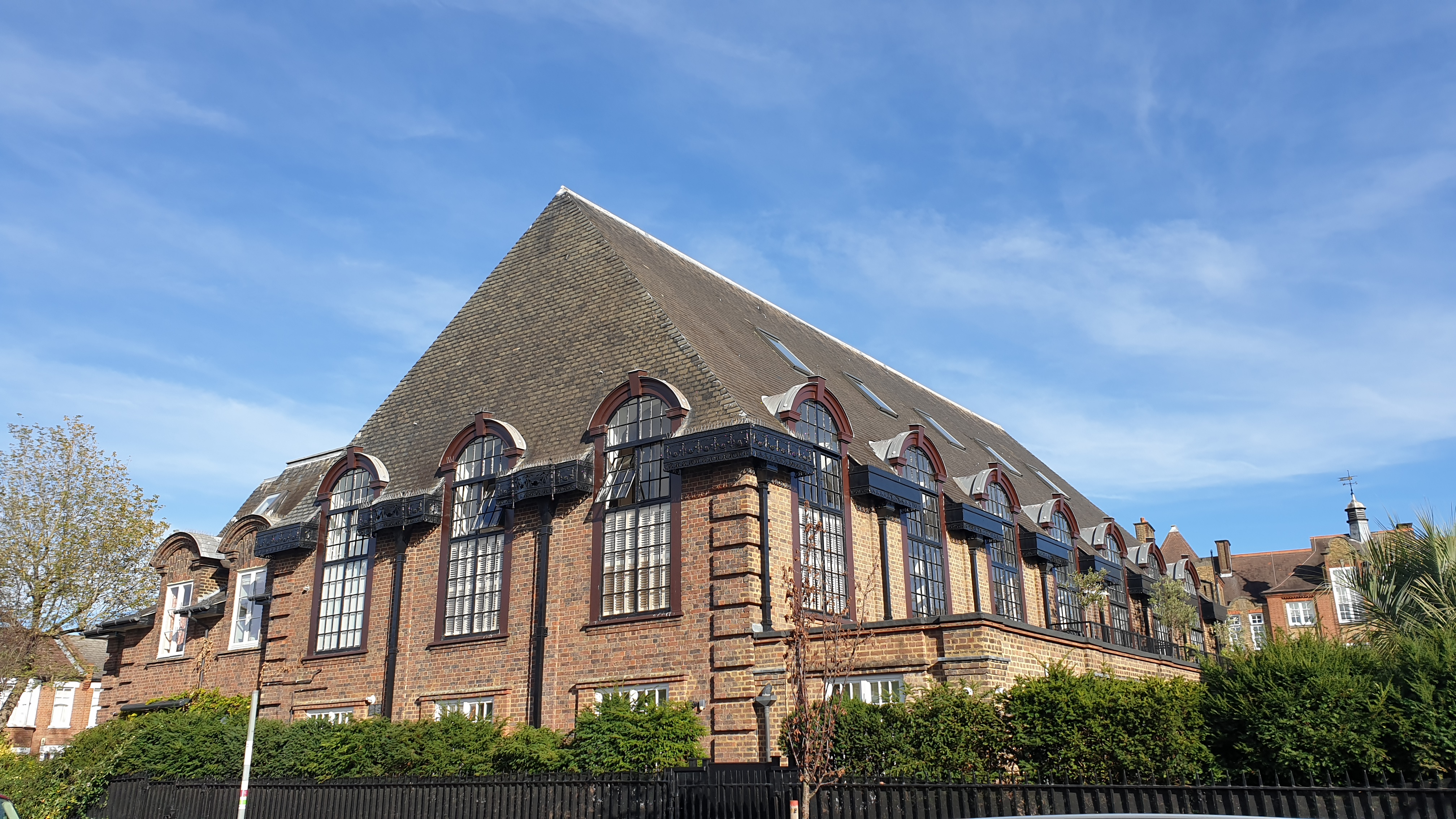
Side view of Hotham Hall, taken from Gamlen Road.

Hotham Hall (formerly St Mary's Hall) is a historic private house in Putney in the London Borough of Wandsworth.

== Location ==
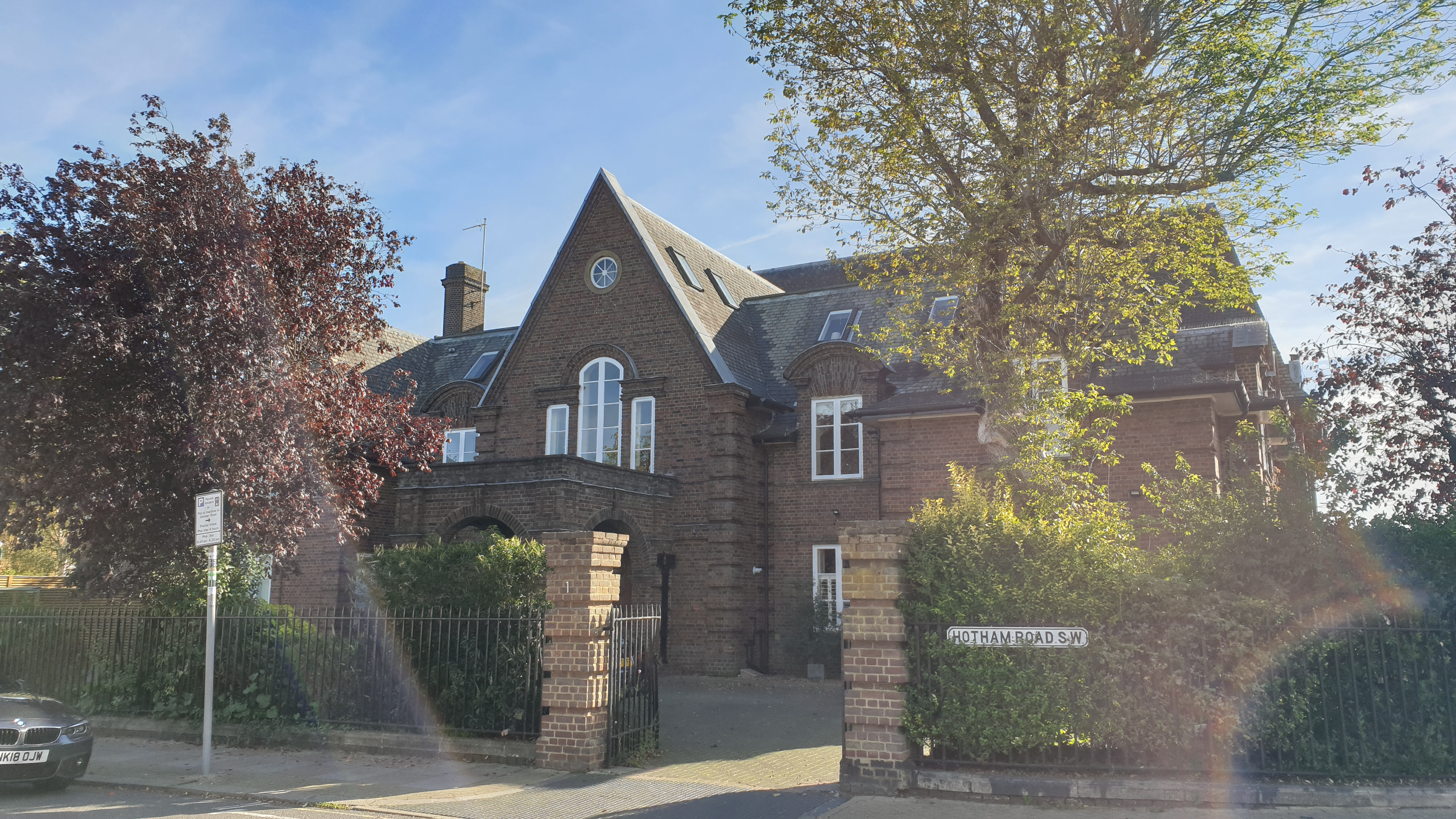
Hotham Hall Putney with Hotham Road sign.

The building is at 1 Hotham Road Putney SW15 next to Hotham Primary School and on the corner with Gamlen Road.

== Site history ==
The site was part of the Pettiward Estate on the road was previously called "Hotham Villas Road", as there were several large houses built there. Sisters Emma Jessie Blanche and Elma Grace Miles inherited the land from their father Alfred Webb Miles on his death in 1903, they donated some of this land to St Mary's Church for the building of a Hall in 1911.

== Building ==
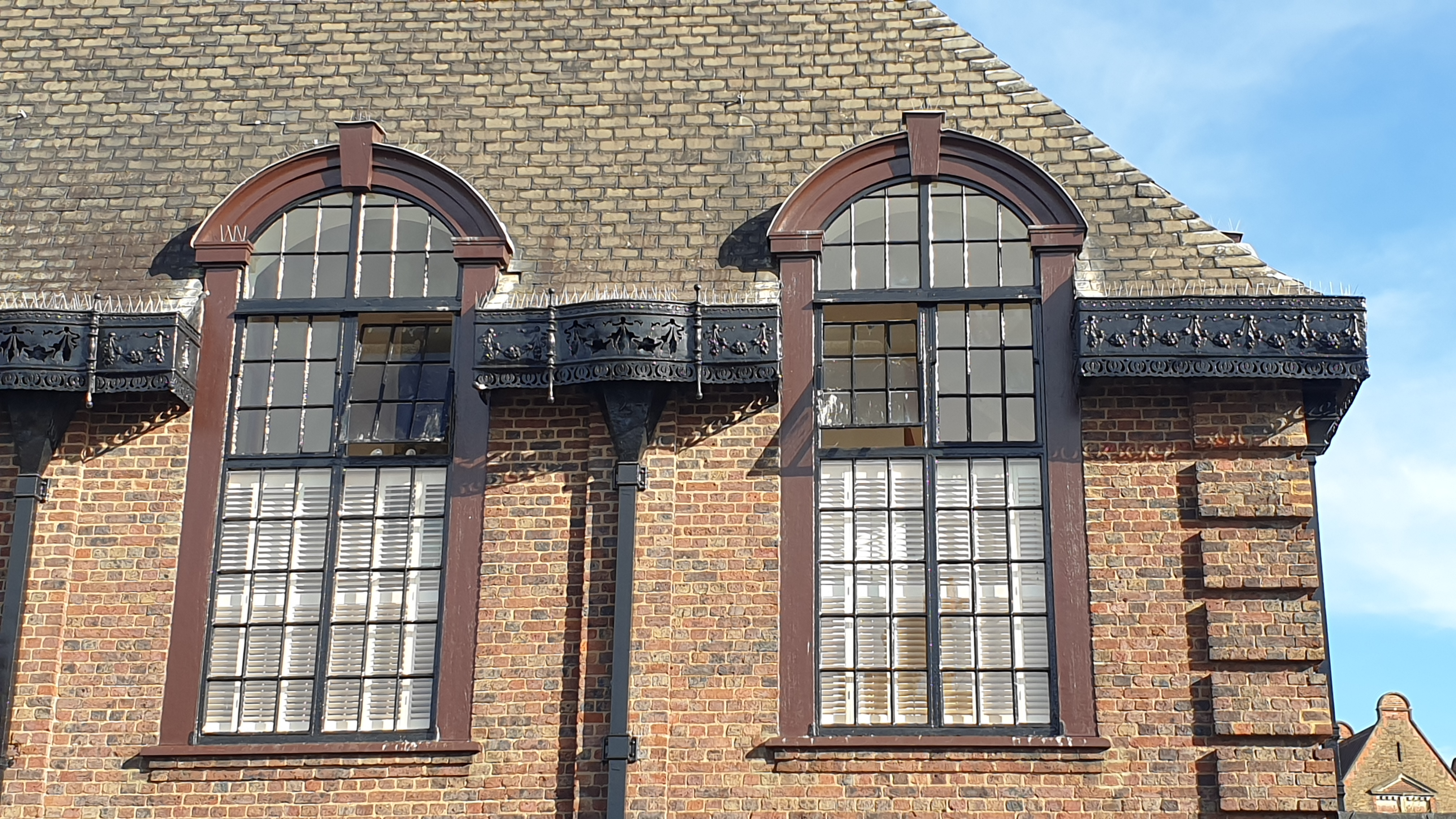
Close up of Hotham Hall windows, taken from Gamlen Road.

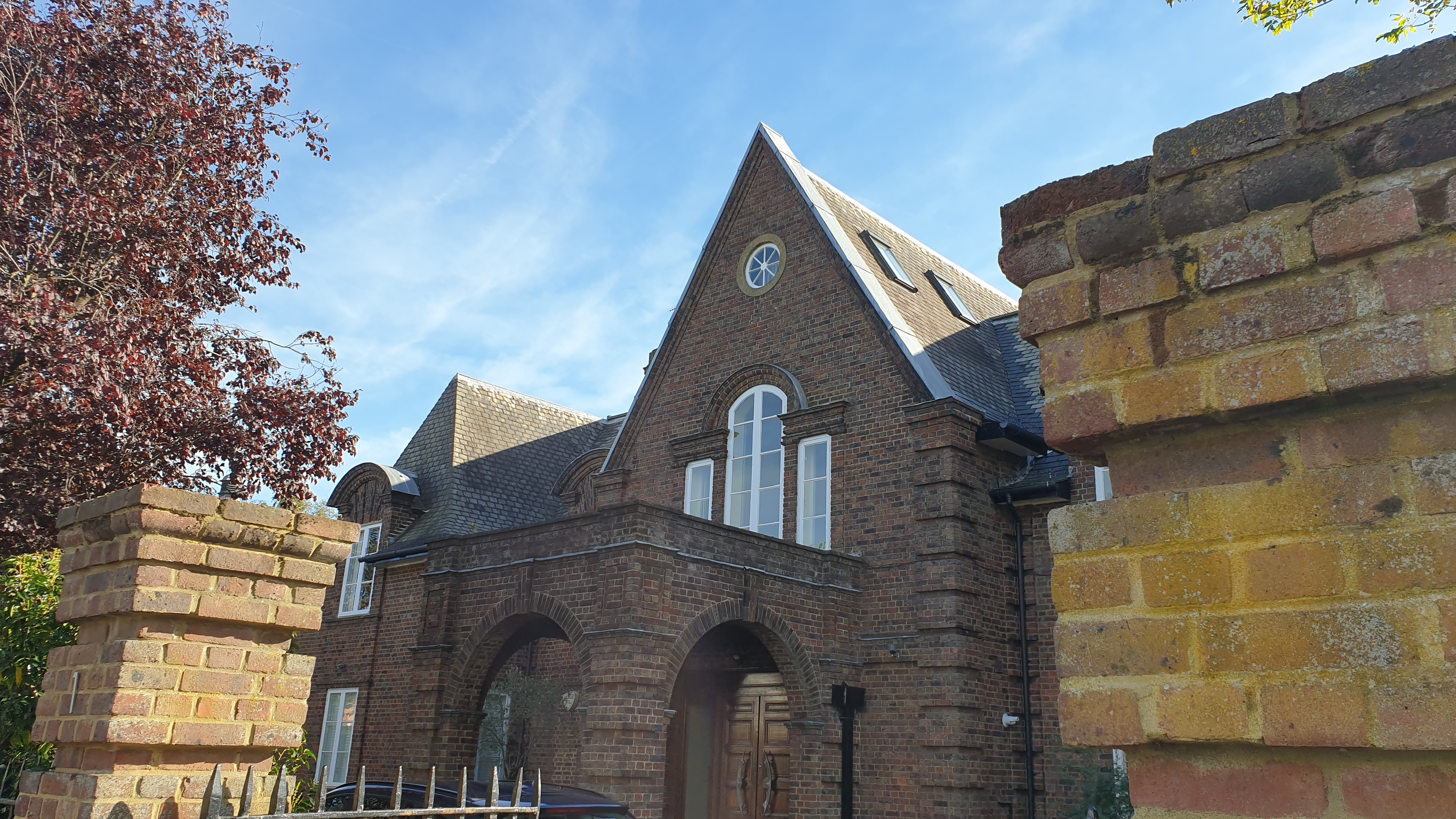
Entry to Hotham Hall, Putney, with gate posts and front door porch.

St Mary's Hall was designed by painter and architect Robert Douglas Wells (1875-1963), who also designed Grand Falls House in Grand Falls-Windsor, Newfoundland. The building was constructed by William Brown & Sons, and opened by local magistrate and MP for Wandsworth, Putney Mr Samuel Samuel in 1913.

By the 1980s the building had fallen into disrepair, it closed in 1986, and was purchased and converted in nine luxury apartments by the Raven Group, renamed Hotham Hall and opened in 1997.

== Notable events ==
St Mary's Hall was host to several notable events, including speeches by Winston Churchill in May 1933 and Anthony Eden in 1934 in support of Conservative candidate Mr Marcus Samuel, (nephew of Samuel Samuel who opened the hall) and gigs by rock bands The Rolling Stones on 15 December 1962, the first gig of Bill Wyman, and The Who on 5 January 1964. The building also hosted theatre productions by the Putney Players in 1960, and was used as rehearsal room by BBC TV.

== Value ==
One of the apartments was valued at £1.35 million in 2019, another was valued at £2.9 million in 2022.
