= Richard Corbould =

English artist (1757–1831)

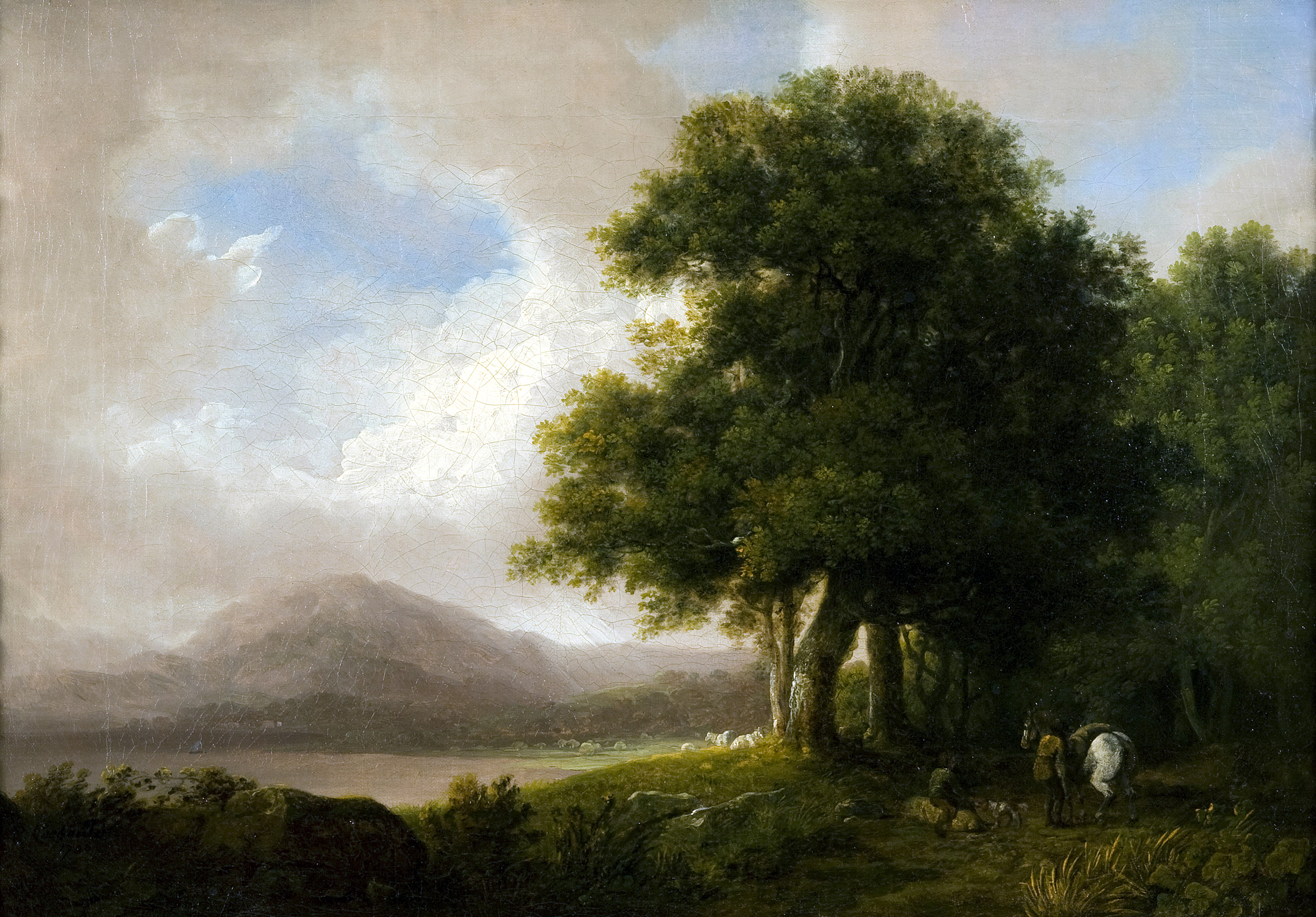
Skiddaw from Derwentwater

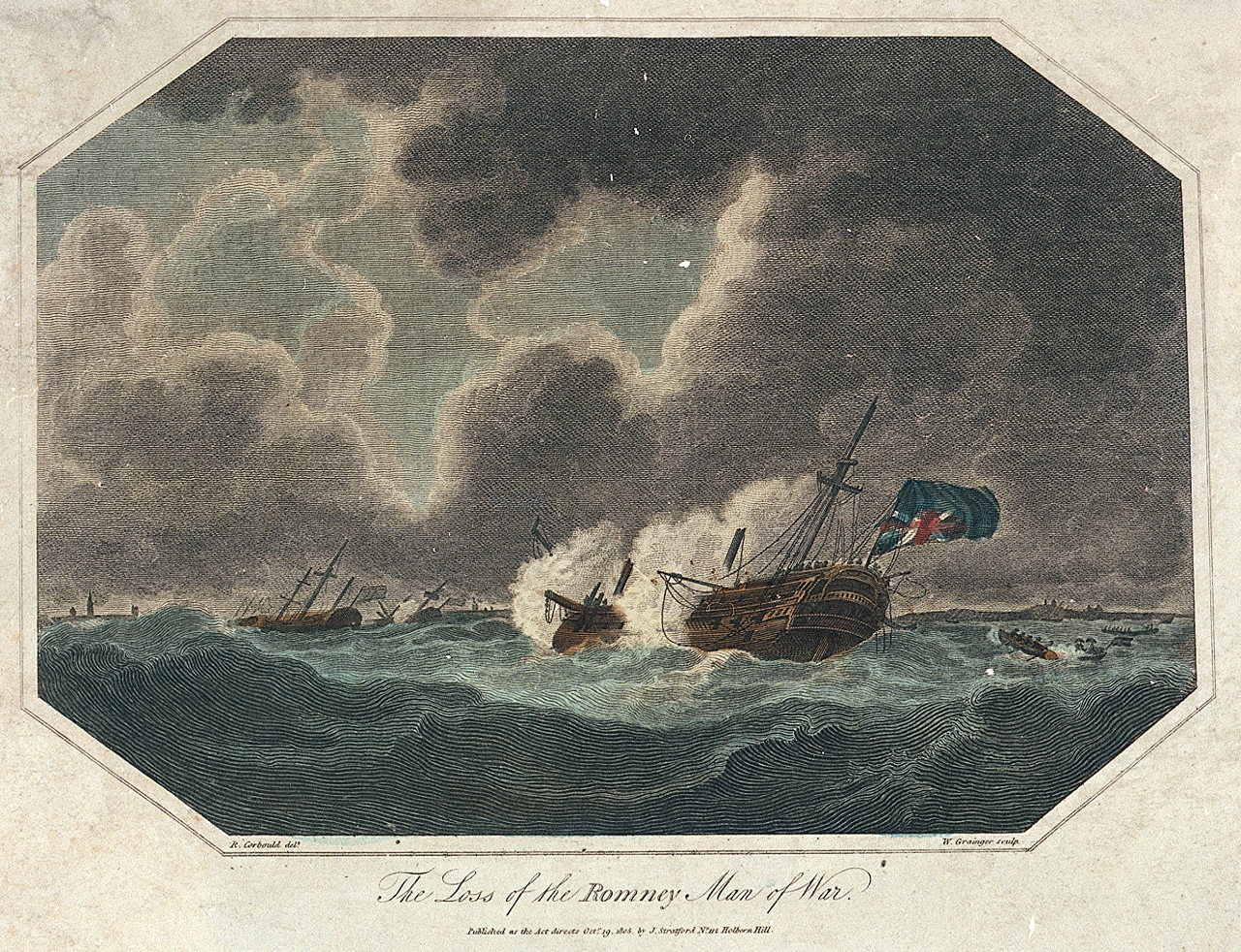
The Loss of the Romney Man of War (1805)

Richard Corbould (18 April 1757 – 17 July 1831) was an English artist.

He was a painter, in oil and watercolour, of portraits, landscape, and occasionally history; of porcelain, and miniatures on ivory, and enamels; and was furthermore an important illustrator of books renowned for his Napoleonic sketches of Ships, and a follower of the old masters. From 1777 to 1811 he was a constant contributor to the Royal Academy. He died at Highgate, north London, in 1831. Of his works exhibited at the Royal Academy may be noticed:

- 1793. Cottagers gathering Sticks.
- 1802. Eve caressing Adam's Flock and The Archangel Michael.
- 1806. Ulysses's Descent into Hades.
- 1806. View at Hampstead. (In the South Kensington Museum.)
