= Ara Najarian =

American politician from California

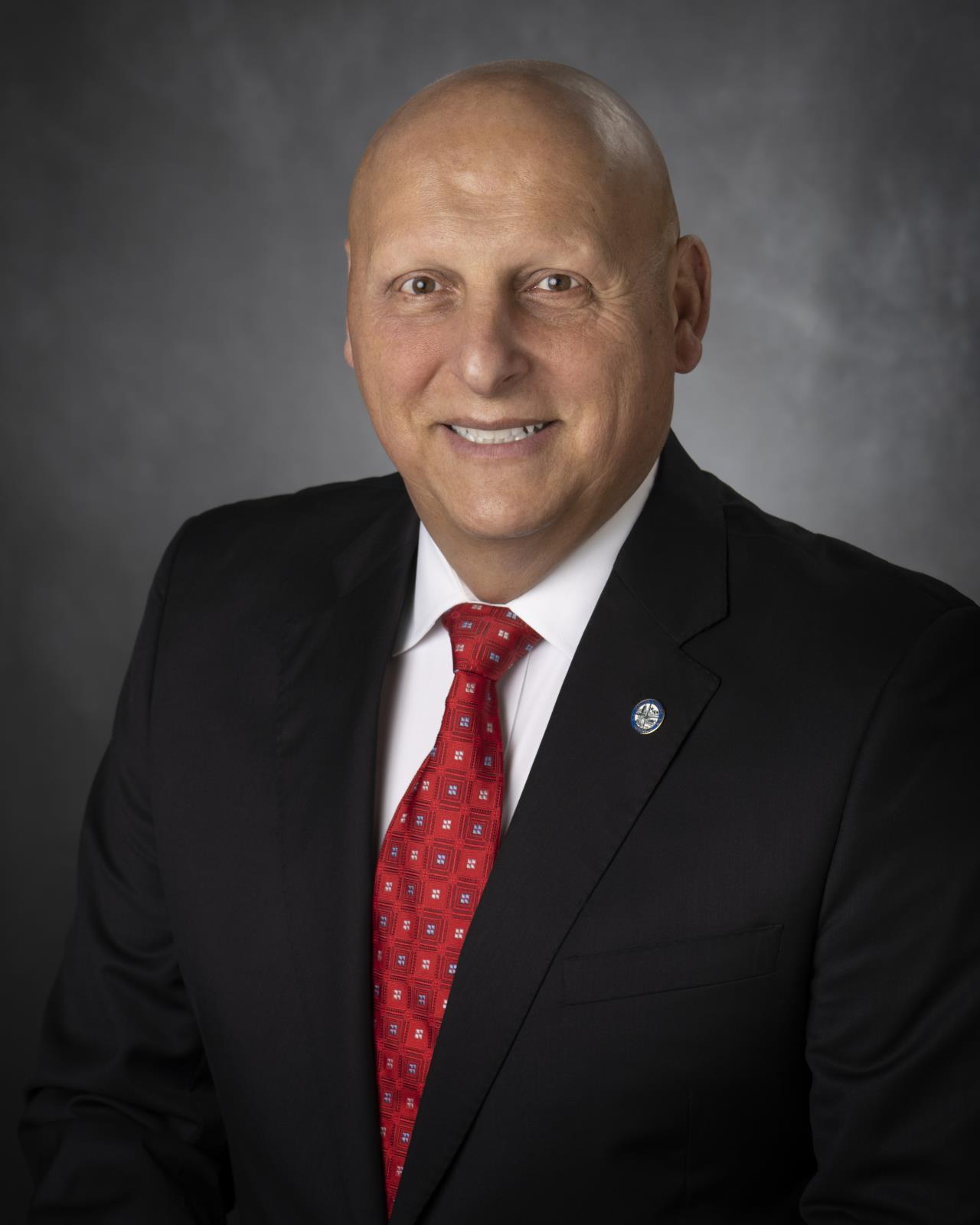

Mayor of Glendale, California
- In office April 15th, 2025 – April 14th, 2026
- Preceded by: Elen Asatryan
- Succeeded by: Ardy Kassakhian
- In office April 2019 – April 2020
- Preceded by: Zareh Sinanyan
- Succeeded by: Vrej Agajanian
- In office April 2015 – April 2016
- Preceded by: Zareh Sinanyan
- Succeeded by: Paula Devine
- In office April 2010 – April 2011
- Preceded by: Frank Quintero
- Succeeded by: Laura Friedman
- In office April 2007 – April 2008
- Preceded by: Dave Weaver
- Succeeded by: John Drayman

Member of the Glendale City Council
- In office April 2005 – June 30th, 2026

Personal details
- Born: Ara James Najarian; September 11, 1960 (age 65) Cleveland, Ohio, U.S.
- Party: Republican
- Spouse: Palmira Perez
- Children: 2
- Education: Occidental College (AB); University of Southern California School of Law (JD)
- Occupation: Lawyer, politician

Ara James Najarian (born September 11, 1960) is an American attorney, retired city council member, and five-time Mayor of Glendale, California. As an Armenian-American politician, he has advocated measures to better represent and integrate the diverse Armenian community in Glendale, which is now one of the largest in the world outside Armenia. In 2010, he was invited to meet with the president and prime minister of Armenia during a visit there. More recently, he has expressed support for strengthening ties with the "new Armenia" following the 2018 Armenian Revolution in spring 2018.

== Early life and education ==
Najarian was born and raised in Ohio. His parents, Vardges and Mary Najarian, are physicians and philanthropists. He attended Bucknell University in Pennsylvania for two years after being recruited to play on their football team.

He moved to Glendale in 1980 when his parents relocated there, transferring to Occidental College, where he overlapped with Barack Obama. Najarian graduated with a bachelor's degree in economics in 1982, and completed his Juris Doctor degree at USC Gould School of Law in Los Angeles in 1985.

== Legal career ==
He served as a law clerk in the Narcotics Section and Glendale Branch Office of the Los Angeles District Attorney's Office from 1983 to 1984. From 1988 to 1998, he was a partner with the law firm of Najarian and Virgilo in Glendale, California. Since 1998, he has operated his own law firm located in Glendale. Since 1992, he has served as a Judge Pro Term for the Los Angeles Superior Court and the Glendale Superior Court. He also is an arbitrator and settlement officer for both courts.

== Public service ==
=== Pre-political career ===
From 1996 to 2002, he served as a commissioner on the Glendale Transportation and Parking Commission. He served as chairman of the commission from 2000 to 2001 and from 2002 to 2003. From 1998 to 2005, he served on Glendale's Short Range Transit Plan, Circulation Element, and San Fernando Road Corridor Zoning committees.

=== Political career ===
He has served on the Glendale City Council since April 2005. He served as Mayor of Glendale from 2007 to 2008, 2010 to 2011, 2015 to 2016, and 2019 to 2020.

Najarian lost his 2016 primary race running for Board of County Supervisors during which he had the endorsement of the League of Conservation Voters.

He retired from the Glendale City Council in 2026 after five terms, and was succeeded by Alek Bartrosouf.

=== Community service ===
He is a member of the board of directors of the Los Angeles County Metropolitan Transportation Authority. He served as chairman of the Los Angeles County Metropolitan Transportation Agency from 2009 to 2010. He has been a member of the board of directors of the Southern California Regional Railroad Authority (Metrolink) since 2006. He served as chairman of the Glendale Housing Authority from 2012 to 2013, chairman of the Glendale Redevelopment Agency from 2009 to 2010, and chairman of the Glendale Transportation and Parking Commission. He is a member, vice chairman and former chairman of the San Fernando Valley Council of Governments. He is a member and former chairman (2010-2011) of the Metropolitan Transportation Authority's board of directors.

He served on the Glendale Community College's board of trustees from 2003 to 2005.

Since 1984, he has served as the director of Medical Outreach for Armenians, Inc.

Since 2003, he has served on the Holy Family High School's board of regents.

== Personal life ==
Najarian is married to Latina news anchor and reporter Palmira Perez. He has two children.
