= Elen Asatryan =

Armenian-American politician (born 1983)

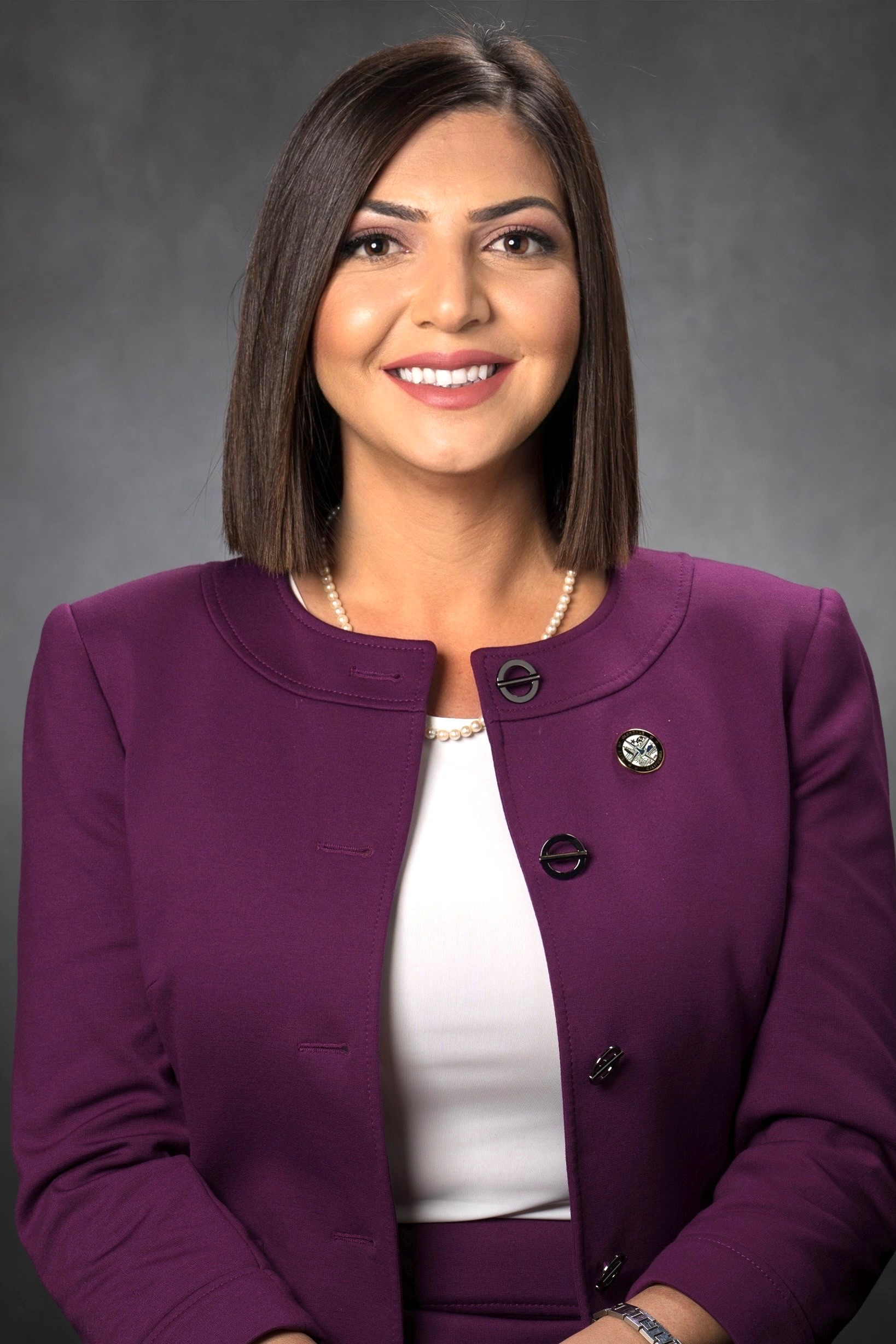

Mayor of Glendale, California
- In office April 2, 2024 – April 15, 2025
- Preceded by: Dan Brotman
- Succeeded by: Ara Najarian

Member of the Glendale City Council
- Incumbent
- Assumed office July 12, 2022

Personal details
- Born: 1983 (age 42–43) Yerevan, Soviet Union
- Party: Democratic
- Education: University of California, Los Angeles (BS)
- Occupation: Politician

Elen Asatryan (Armenian: Էլեն Ասատրյան; born 1983) is an Armenian-American politician who is a council member and the immediate past mayor of Glendale, California.

== Early life and education ==
Asatryan, with her family, moved from Armenia to Glendale at the age of 10, where she attended Columbus Elementary School, Toll Middle School, and Herbert Hoover High School. She is a graduate of the University of California, Los Angeles, where she studied political science, with concentrations in American politics and international relations.

At the age of 15, Asatryan began her political career as a volunteer for Rafi Manoukian’s 1999 Glendale City Council campaign.

== Career ==
=== Political advocacy ===
==== Armenian National Committee of America ====
In 2006, Asatryan became the Executive Director of the Armenian National Committee of America's Glendale chapter, and in 2013, was appointed the Executive Director of the entire Western Region. Asatryan led several initiatives, including creating public policy fellowship and internship programs for high school and college students; the establishment of the Glendale Domestic Violence Task Force; launching and implementing voter registration and "get out the vote" initiatives; securing recognition for the Armenian Genocide and Republic of Artsakh; and adoption of a genocide education curriculum in California public schools.

In 2017, Asatryan oversaw discussions with Caruso following the Americana at Brand's refusal to provide paid advertising space on its billboard for “Architects of Denial,” an Armenian Genocide documentary. Caruso agreed to improve the Americana at Brand's relationship with the local Armenian community.

==== Democratic Party ====
As a member of the Democratic Party and the Democratic Senatorial Campaign Committee, Asatryan introduced a resolution for the 2021 California Democratic Convention, condemning Turkey and Azerbaijan for war crimes committed during the Second Nagorno-Karabakh War.

==== Other ====
In 2015, Asatryan was appointed to Glendale, California's Parks, Recreation & Community Services Commission, and was appointed as the Chair in 2018. In this role, she advocated for open spaces throughout the city, especially in urban south Glendale.

=== Elected office ===
==== City of Glendale ====
In 2022, noticing a lack of community knowledge about COVID-19 assistance programs, and wanting to "create a system that works for working-class families", Asatryan ran the Glendale City Council. She finished second out of eight candidates, in an election in which the top three vote-getters won, becoming the first female Armenian-American to be elected to the Council.

In April 2024, Asatryan was selected as Mayor of Glendale, thereby becoming the first Armenian-American woman in the position. In response, fellow Councilmember Ardy Kassakhian stated “I think it's an incredibly important day for Glendale and for Armenian Americans.

In May 2024, Asatryan was appointed as a commissioner to the Burbank-Glendale-Pasadena Airport Authority, replacing Paula Devine.

As Mayor, Asatryan has stated that diversity is a priority. Amid increased political polarization, she aims to foster communication among diverse groups, and plans to hold meetings with various community organizations. To support Glendale's Black community, she has responded affirmatively to calls for City sponsorship of the Glendale Black Scholars Fund. She has highlighted efforts made by the city to quash the inequities women face, noting that Glendale became the seventh city to join the California Equal Pay Pledge in February 2024.

In June 2024, Asatryan traveled to Armenia to participate in a United States-Armenia Local Democracy Forum organized by the United States Department of State. There, she visited Glendale's sister cities Gyumri and Kapan, and engaged in discussions regarding effective engagement with local community groups and non-profit organizations. She has indicated that she will facilitate a partnership between Yerevan's Women's Support Center and the Glendale YWCA location, as well as domestic violence response training by the Glendale Police Department.

In October 2024, Asatryan delivered remarks reaffirming the City of Glendale’s long-standing partnership with the Armenian American Museum, noting the importance of such an institution in fostering education, unity, and cultural pride.

In October 2024, Asatryan travelled to South Korea, where she struck an entertainment partnership deal with the Incheon Free Economic Zone. The agreement includes a new government-to-government platform jointly built by the governments of Incheon and Glendale and sharing it with entertainment companies in both cities. In celebration of the memorandum of understanding, the inaugural "Hollywood and Asia Entertainment Forum" was held.

==== California State Assembly ====
In the 2024 California State Assembly election, Asatryan ran for the 44th District, and was endorsed by elected officials such as Lieutenant Governor Eleni Kounalakis and State Senators Anthony Portantino and Susan Rubio. She finished fourth in the primary election.

Later reflecting upon being targeted during her campaign, Asatryan stated "The groups that were constantly posting, 'Oh, she's this', or 'She's that', or whatnot during my State Assembly race, they didn't even know who my opponents are, and when the race finished, they're like, 'Who's Nick [Schultz]?'"
