= Alek Bartrosouf =

Armenian-American politician (born 1986)

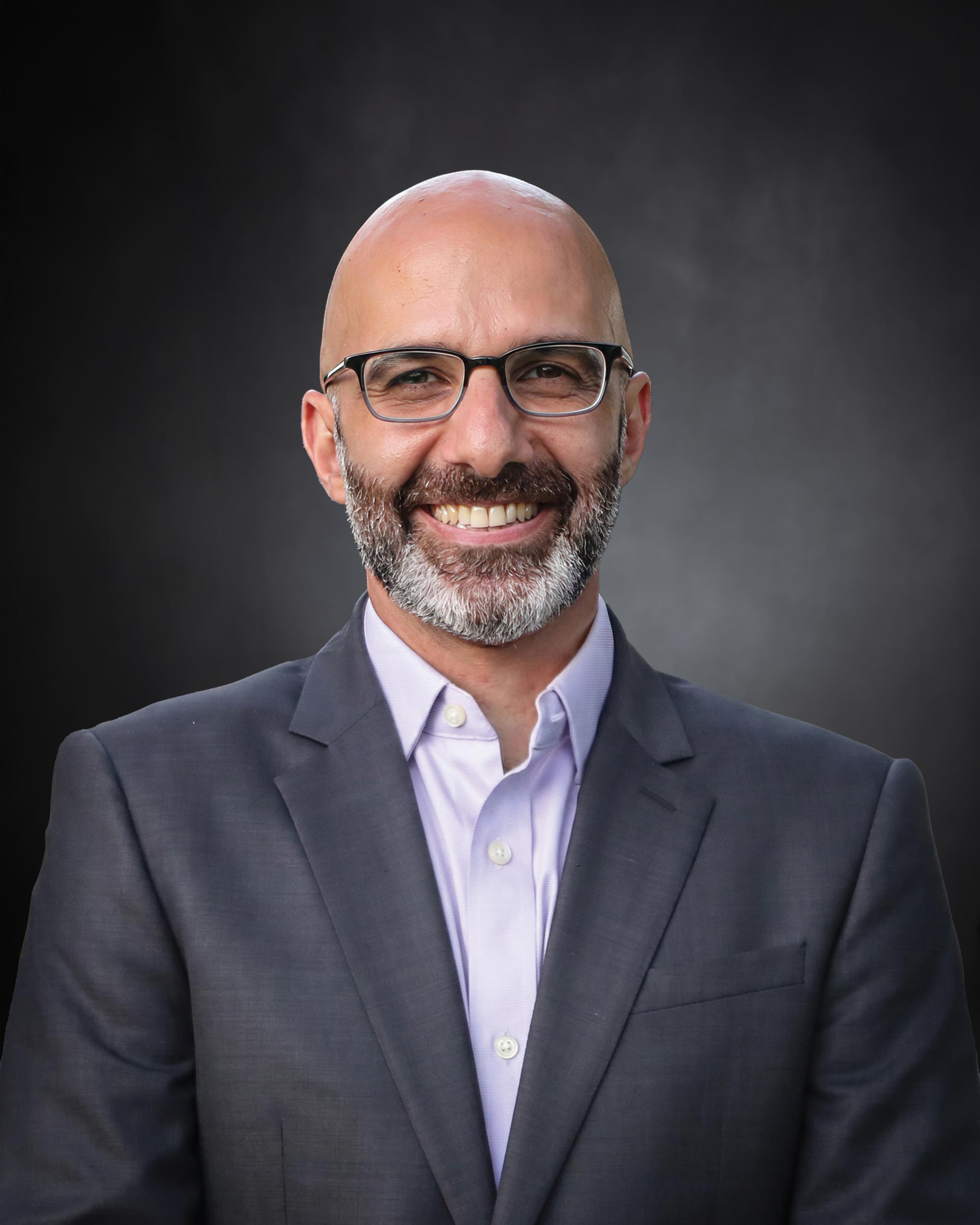

Member of the Glendale City Council
- Incumbent
- Assumed office June 30th, 2026

Personal details
- Born: 1986 (age 39–40)
- Party: Nonpartisan
- Spouse: Alex Calleros
- Education: University of California, Santa Cruz (BS), Psychology; University of California, Los Angeles (MS), Urban Planning
- Occupation: Politician, Urban planner

Alek Bartrosouf is an Armenian-American politician who is a City Council member in Glendale, California.

== Career ==
=== Urban planning ===
In 2009, Bartrosouf began his civic engagement by co-founding Coalition for a Green Glendale, which created several community gardens in collaboration with the City of Glendale. In 2011, he became a founding member of Walk Bike Glendale, an organization dedicated to sustainable alternatives to driving.

Under Mike Bonin, Bartrosouf served as Los Angeles's 11th City Council district's transportation and mobility deputy.

Bartrosouf went on to serve on Glendale's Transportation and Parking Commission and its Sustainability Commission, before returning to the Transportation and Parking Commission.

He is a transportation planner in Los Angeles Department of Transportation’s (LADOT) Active Transportation Division, which focuses on biking, walking and using other self-powered modes of travel.

=== Glendale City Council ===
==== 2026 election ====
On November 14, 2025, Bartrosouf announced his candidacy for the Glendale city council, and stated a focus on making the city “affordable, safe, and connected—with streets designed for people, more vibrant public spaces, and responsive city services.” He campaigned with the slogan “Let’s Build Community.” His platform included urbanist goals such as walkable streets, more parks and plazas, and improved public transit, including the North Hollywood to Pasadena Bus Rapid Transit Project. He also called for the creation of more entry-level and “missing middle” housing for sale, including townhomes and condominiums that appeal to younger buyers.

Bartrosouf was elected to the Glendale City Council in June 2026, succeeding the retiring five-term incumbent Ara Najarian, and was sworn in later that month.

==== Tenure ====
In July 2026, he replaced fellow councilmember Dan Brotman on the San Fernando Valley Council of Governments (SFVCOG) and the Arroyo Verdugo Cities Joint Powers Authority (AVCJPA).

Following a 2026 FIFA World Cup viewing event at the Artsakh Paseo, a pedestrianized street, Bartrosouf urged the quick addition of shade trees to existing landscaping. He has also remained committed to the North Hollywood to Pasadena Bus Rapid Transit Project, inviting Glendale residents to engage Metro as the line is constructed.

In August 2026, Bartrosouf's outlined the following goals for his first term in office:

1. Increased shade in transit-rich corridors and less-affluent areas
2. Updated regulations on the use of HAWK crosswalk beacons
3. Develop a bicycle lane network
4. Develop a first/last-mile strategy for the North Hollywood to Pasadena Bus Rapid Transit Project

== Personal life ==
Bartrosouf is gay. He is married to Alex Calleros.

== Electoral history ==
2026 Glendale City Council election
Candidate	Votes	%
Dan Brotman (incumbent)	19,063	17.85
Elen Asatryan (incumbent)	17,358	16.25
Alek Bartrosouf	15,420	14.44
Patrick Murphy	11,822	11.07
Alex Balekian	10,968	10.27
Beth Brooks	8,258	7.73
Vrej Agajanian	6,394	5.99
Carolyn Kaloostian	5,190	4.86
Evelina Sarian	5,072	4.75
Ronnie Gharibian	3,722	3.48
Gevorg Grigoryan	2,103	1.97
Davit Mnatsakanyan	1,431	1.34
Total votes	106,801	100.00

== See also ==
- List of LGBTQ Armenians
