= Zareh Sinanyan =

Armenian-American lawyer and politician

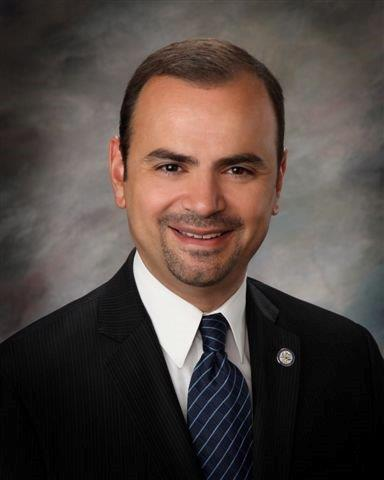

High Commissioner of Diaspora Affairs of Armenia
- Incumbent
- Assumed office June 14, 2019
- Preceded by: Position established (Mkhitar Hayrapetyan as Minister of Diaspora)

Member of the Glendale City Council
- In office April 2013 – April 2018

Mayor of Glendale, California
- In office April 2018 – April 2019
- Preceded by: Vartan Gharpetian
- Succeeded by: Ara Najarian
- In office April 2014 – April 2015
- Preceded by: Dave Weaver
- Succeeded by: Ara Najarian

Personal details
- Born: Zareh John Sinanyan; December 4, 1973 (age 52) Yerevan, Soviet Union
- Children: 4
- Education: University of California, Los Angeles University of Southern California

Zareh John Sinanyan (Armenian: Զարեհ Սինանյան, born December 4, 1973) is an Armenian-American politician currently serving as the High Commissioner of Diaspora Affairs of Armenia. He is a former member of the city council of Glendale, California and twice served as the city's mayor. As a city councilman, he held posts in various commissions, including Parks, Recreation and Community Service, and the Community Development Block Grant Advisory Committee.

On June 14, 2019 Sinanyan was appointed High Commissioner of Diaspora Affairs of Armenia (a position created to replace the abolished post of Minister of Diaspora) by Prime Minister Nikol Pashinyan.

== Early life and education ==
Zareh Sinanyan was born in Yerevan, Soviet Union, in 1973 and attended the local school No. 172. His father was born in Istanbul, Turkey and settled in Armenia in 1946. His mother is from Talin, Armenia.

He and his family immigrated to the United States in 1988 and settled in Burbank, California. Sinanyan attended the John Muir Middle School in Burbank and went on to graduate from Burbank High School. In 1997 he earned a bachelor's degrees in political science and history in 1997 at the University of California, Los Angeles. He then attended law school at the University of Southern California, where he obtained his Juris Doctor. While in law school, Sinanyan worked for the United States Securities and Exchange Commission and interned for Justice Earl Johnson of the California Court of Appeal. After his graduation from law school, he entered civil litigation service and ran his own law office.

== Political career ==
Sinanyan was appointed to the Parks, Recreation and Community Service's Commission of Glendale in 2006 and held this position until 2008. He served as chairman to the Community Development Block Grant Advisory Committee from 2009 to 2011. He was also a commissioner to the Community Development Block Grant Advisory Committee from 2008 to 2013.

=== City Councilman ===
Sinanyan ran for one of three Glendale City Council seats in the April 2013 election and finished third out of twelve candidates. He is the first Armenian-born politician to hold a seat on the Glendale City Council. At his second City Council meeting, he publicly apologized for "racial and homophobic slurs" he had posted online for several years before the election.

In July 2013, Sinanyan supported the establishment of a memorial to Korean comfort women in the Glendale Central Park, over the objections of the government of Japan and dozens of Japanese-Americans. Sinanyan spoke at the unveiling of the memorial in late July, citing his own background as the grandson of an Armenian genocide survivor and asserting: "The best way to resolve conflicts... the best way to heal wounds... is to acknowledge them. My people, my grandfather, were subjected to a horrible, horrible crime... To this day, because no apology has come, no proper acknowledgement has come... the wound is deep, it's festering, and there can be no moving forward without it."

In March 2018, Sinanyan was honored by Equality Armenia for his support of both LGBT and Armenian causes.

=== Mayor ===
In April 2014, Sinanyan was appointed mayor of Glendale, California replacing former mayor Dave Weaver.

In November 2014 Sinanyan and Los Angeles mayor Eric Garcetti were among the California politicians invited to attend the opening of a BBCN representative office in Seoul, South Korea. Sinanyan also met with Lee Koon-hyon, Secretary General of the Saenuri Party.

=== Controversy ===
In 2013, Zareh Sinanyan made several racist and homophobic remarks online, using slurs to describe gays, threatening rape, and insulting Mexican-Americans, Muslims and women.

== Personal life ==
Zareh Sinanyan and his wife, Lori Sinanyan, have four children, 1 daughter and 3 sons, named Areg Sinanyan (Youngest), Aram Sinanyan, Mher Sinanyan, and Anahid Sinanyan (Oldest)

== Endorsements ==
Sinanyan endorsed Bernie Sanders for the Democratic Party nomination in the 2016 presidential election.

== See also ==
- History of the Armenian Americans in Los Angeles
