= Glendale Main Post Office =

- U.S. National Register of Historic Places
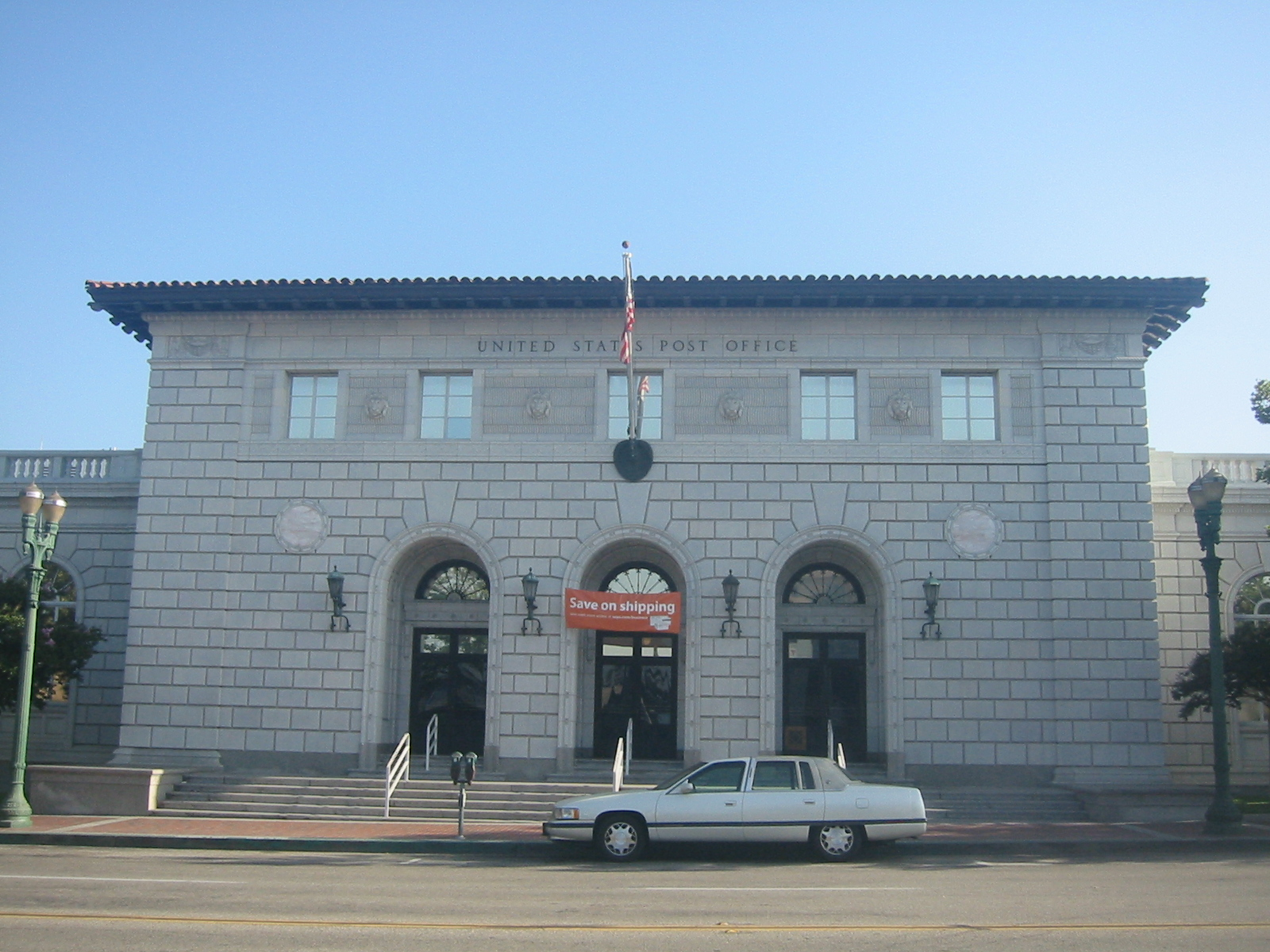
- Location: Glendale, California
- Coordinates: 34°8′48.721″N 118°15′8.608″W
- Built: 1934
- Architect: George M. Lindsay
- NRHP reference No.: 85000128
- Added to NRHP: January 11, 1985

Glendale Main Post Office is a historic post office in Glendale, California, operated by the United States Postal Service (USPS).

It was built in 1934 in an Italian Renaissance style. Construction of the post office cost $455,000. For the opening ceremony, the 1934 Postmaster, E. F. Heisser extended a general invitation for visitors to inspect the structure, with music provided by the Glendale Letter Carriers' band and postal employees acting as guides. Robert Winter and Robert Gebhard stated in A Guide to Architecture in Los Angeles that the post office has a "good interior". It was listed on the National Register of Historic Places (NRHP) on January 11, 1985 (#85000128). It has 56,000 square feet (5,200 m^{2}) of space. As of 1988 it includes a small museum of items from post offices consolidated into Glendale Main.

In 2013 the USPS proposed closing the post office and moving operations to another facility, a proposal opposed by the Glendale Historical Society, Congressperson Adam Schiff, and Glendale City Council. In 2013 the post office did not use most of the space in the building.

In 2014 a passport service center was established in this post office. It serves the communities of Glendale (including Verdugo City), Altadena, Arcadia, Duarte, La Cañada Flintridge, Monrovia, Montrose, Pasadena, Sierra Madre, and South Pasadena, as well as the Los Angeles neighborhood of Sunland-Tujunga. Prior to 2014 the local post offices in those communities offered passport services.
