= Mkhitar Hayrapetyan =

Armenian politician

- Մխիթար Հայրապետյան
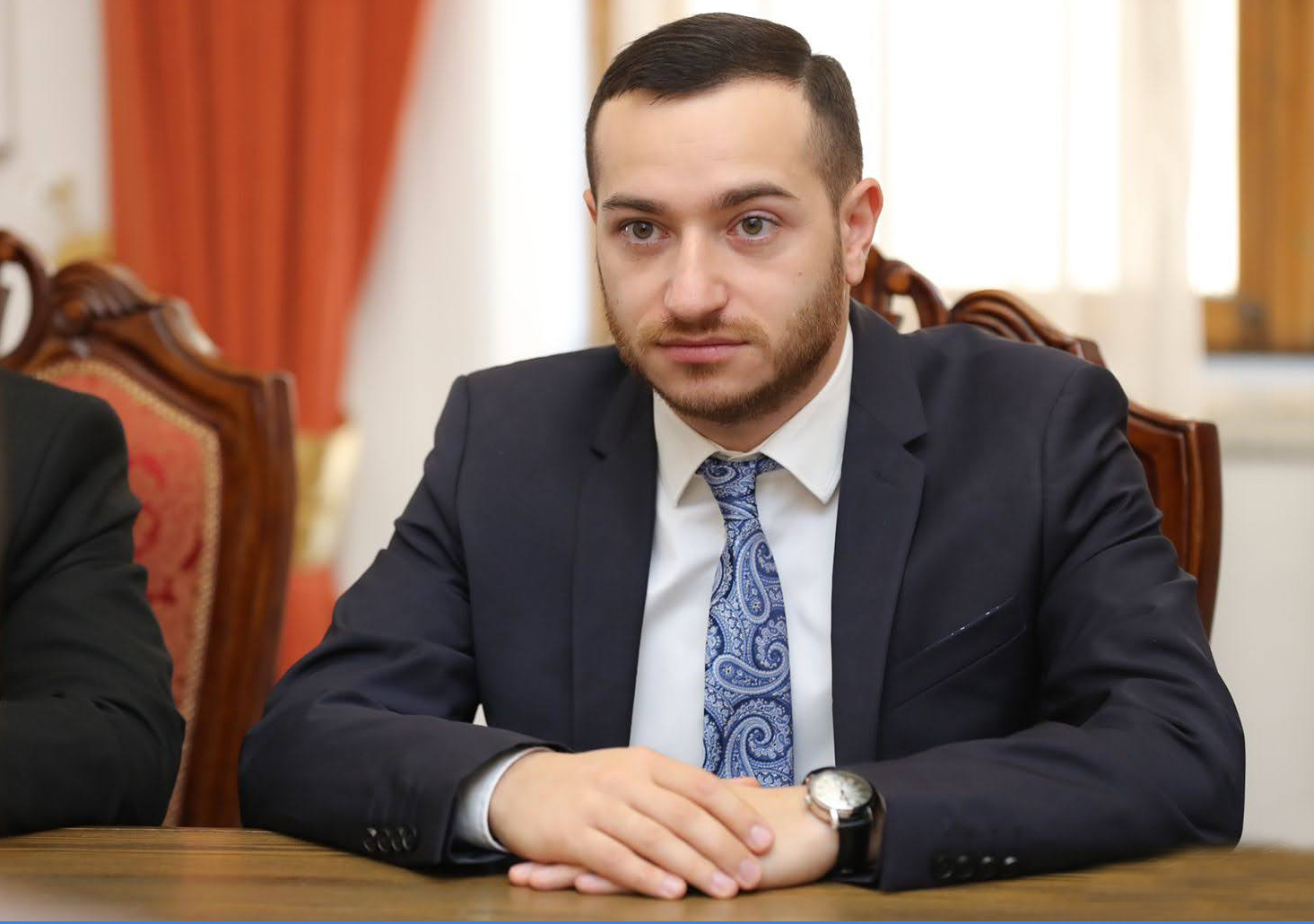
- Hayrapetyan in 2021

Minister of High-Tech Industry
- Incumbent
- Assumed office 14 January 2019
- Parliamentary group: district #1 of the My Step Alliance

Minister of Diaspora
- In office 11 May 2018 – 14 January 2019
- Prime Minister: Nikol Pashinyan
- Preceded by: Hranush Hakobyan
- Succeeded by: Zareh Sinanyan (as a High Commissioner of Diaspora Affairs of Armenia)

Personal details
- Born: May 15, 1990 (age 36) Yerevan, Armenia
- Party: Civil Contract (2015–) My Step Alliance
- Spouse: Single
- Education: Yerevan State University

Mkhitar Hayrapetyan (Armenian: Մխիթար Հայրապետյան; born May 15, 1990) is an Armenian politician serving as the Minister of High-Tech Industry of Armenia. He previously held the position of Minister of Diaspora from May 11, 2018, to January 11, 2019.

On December 9, 2018, Hayrapetyan was elected as a member of the National Assembly of Armenia from the territorial electoral list of electoral district #1 under the My Step Alliance. Since January 18, 2019, he has served as the Chairman of the Standing Committee on Science, Education, Culture, Diaspora, Youth, and Sport. Additionally, he led the Armenian delegation to the Euronest Parliamentary Assembly.

At the age of 27, Hayrapetyan and Austrian politician Sebastian Kurz were among the youngest ministers in Europe at the time of their appointments.

== Education ==
Mkhitar Hayrapetyan attended Yerevan State University (YSU), where he studied at the Faculty of Oriental Studies, specializing in Turkish studies. He earned a Bachelor's degree from the Department of Turkish Studies in 2011 and later completed a Master's degree in the same field from 2011 to 2013.

From 2012 to 2013, he was a member of the Student Scientific Society of the Faculty of Oriental Studies and the Student Council of YSU.

Hayrapetyan completed his secondary education at School No. 127 in Yerevan.

== Career ==
In 2011, Hayrapetyan founded the Young Politicians Association and served as its vice president until April 2015. In January 2016, he became the founding president of the Civic Education and Youth Development Center.

From 2010 to 2017, alongside his public and political activities, Hayrapetyan worked as a Middle East expert, with a focus on Turkey, for several local newspapers.

== Political career ==
Mkhitar Hayrapetyan is a founding member of the Civil Contract party. In December 2016, he was elected chairman of the party's Nor Nork regional organization and became a member of its political council. From 2016 to 2018, he served as the party's Coordinator on Diaspora Affairs.

On December 9, 2018, Hayrapetyan was elected to the National Assembly of Armenia from the territorial electoral list of electoral district #1 under the My Step alliance. Since January 18, 2019, he has served as the Chairman of the Standing Committee on Science, Education, Culture, Diaspora, Youth, and Sport. Additionally, he has led the Armenian delegation to the Euronest Parliamentary Assembly.

== Minister of Diaspora ==
On May 11, 2018, former Armenian President Armen Sargsyan appointed Mkhitar Hayrapetyan as Minister of Diaspora on the recommendation of Prime Minister Nikol Pashinyan, in accordance with Article 150 of the Constitution.

During his tenure, Hayrapetyan initiated the reorganization of the Come Home program, aiming to eliminate previous abuses and improve its effectiveness.

As part of his official duties, he conducted several international visits to strengthen Armenia's ties with the diaspora, including:

- Cyprus (September 24–27, 2018): Hayrapetyan led a delegation to Cyprus, where he met with President Nicos Anastasiades and representatives of the Armenian community.
- United States (July 27 – August 7, 2018): He visited Los Angeles, New York, and Boston, holding meetings with politicians and members of the Armenian diaspora.
- Syria (September 20–22, 2018): Hayrapetyan became the first Armenian official to visit Aleppo since the start of the Syrian Civil War in 2011.
- Lebanon (September 20–22, 2018): He visited Anjar and Beirut, meeting with the Catholicos of the Great House of Cilicia, Aram I, and members of the Armenian community.
- Egypt (September 24–27, 2018): During his visit to Egypt, he met with the Prime Minister and representatives of the Armenian community.

== Awards and recognition ==
In 2026, Hayrapetyan was included in the "Government AI 100" list by the global platform Apolitical, which recognizes the 100 most influential public sector leaders worldwide driving the development and implementation of Artificial Intelligence (AI) in governance. According to Apolitical, Hayrapetyan plays a pivotal role in shaping Armenia's technological and innovative agenda. Under his coordination, several strategic AI initiatives have been launched, most notably the development of a large-scale national AI data center and the promotion of AI literacy through the systemic integration of AI education in schools and universities.
