= Ministry of High-Tech Industry (Armenia) =

Government ministry of Armenia

Ministry of High-Tech Industry logo

The Ministry of High-Tech Industry (Armenian: Բարձր տեխնոլոգիական արդյունաբերության նախարարություն) is a ministry of the Armenian government, headquartered in Yerevan. The Ministry of High-Tech Industry is a central body of executive authority that develops and implements the Armenian government's policy in the spheres of communication, information, information technology and information security, postal services, licensing, granting of permits and military industry. The current Minister of High-Tech Industry is Mkhitar Hayrapetyan.

== See also ==
- Economy of Armenia
- Telecommunications in Armenia
