= Ardy Kassakhian =

American politician

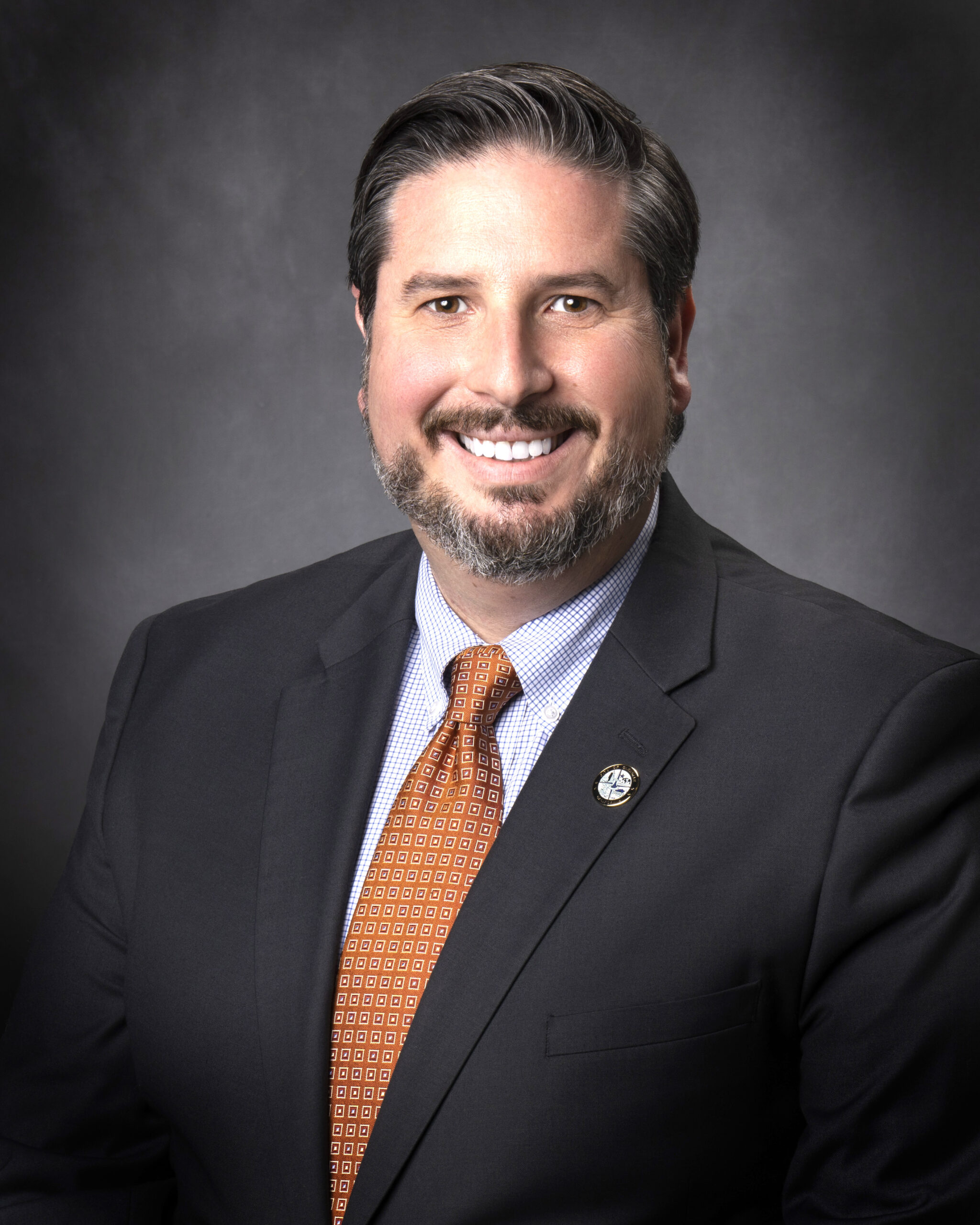

Mayor of Glendale, California
- Incumbent
- Assumed office April 14, 2026
- Preceded by: Ara Najarian
- In office April 2022 – April 2023
- Preceded by: Paula Devine
- Succeeded by: Dan Brotman

Personal details
- Born: Boston, Massachusetts, U.S.
- Party: Democratic
- Spouse: Courtney Relph
- Children: 1
- Education: University of California, Los Angeles (BA); Northwestern University (MA)
- Occupation: Politician

Ardashes "Ardy" Kassakhian (Armenian: Արտաշէս Քասախեան) is an Armenian-American politician who is a Councilmember and current mayor of Glendale, California.

== Biography ==
Kassakhian was born in Boston, Massachusetts (U.S.). He has been a resident of Glendale since 1986. He graduated from the University of California in Los Angeles with a Bachelor of Arts in History and received his Master of Arts in Public Policy and Administration from Northwestern University.

On 5 April 2022, Kassakhian was selected as the Glendale City’s Mayor, one of the largest cities in Los Angeles County. This was Kassakhian’s first time serving in the role of Mayor.

== Political positions ==
=== Armenia and Artsakh ===
In response to the 2022 blockade of the Republic of Artsakh, Kassakhian wrote a letter to Joe Biden, stating “I am extremely disappointed by the administration’s failure to hold Azerbaijan accountable for these flagrant human rights violations, and the continued waiver of Section 907 of the FREEDOM Support Act,” wrote Kassakhian. “In continuing to supply Azerbaijan with U.S. military assistance – amidst verifiable reports of war crimes and egregious human rights abuses – we reward Azerbaijan’s aggression, and risk emboldening and enabling this type of conduct.”

=== LGBTQ+ Rights ===
At GALAS LGBTQ+ Armenian Society's June 2022 Queernissage marketplace in Studio City, Los Angeles, Kassakhian stated "If someone’s going to threaten this group of people, I’m going stand there with them and make sure I’m there and present and show myself as a mayor of a large Armenian community — saying that I am here to serve every Armenian."

Kassakhian attended a December 2022 candlelight vigil hosted by glendaleOUT to mourn and remember LGBTQ+ deaths. The vigil raised funds for the Transgender Law Center and Pink Armenia.

== Personal life ==
He is married to Courtney Relph and has one son.
