= Paula Devine =

Educator and politician from California

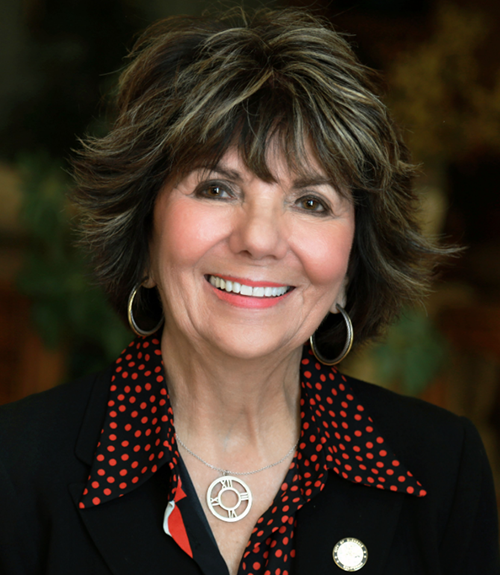

Mayor of Glendale, California
- In office April 2016 – April 2017
- Preceded by: Ara Najarian
- Succeeded by: Vartan Gharpetian

Personal details
- Spouse: Arthur Devine
- Occupation: Educator, politician

Paula Devine is a former educator and politician from California, United States. Devine is a former mayor and member of the Glendale City Council in Glendale, California.

== Education ==
Devine earned a master's degree in education administration from California State University, Los Angeles.

== Career ==
Devine is a former teacher and coach at San Gabriel High School.

She is a former guest lecturer in Women's Studies Program at Glendale Community College.

On June 3, 2014, Devine won the special election and became a member of city council in Glendale, California. She received 33.69% of the votes. Devine replaced Frank Quintero, who was appointed to replace Rafi Manoukian, who was elected as the city treasurer.

In 2015, as an incumbent, Devine won the election and continued serving as a member of the city council for Glendale.

In April 2016, she became the mayor of Glendale until April 2017.

== Awards ==
- 2013: Woman of the Year, presented by Adam Schiff.
- 2018: Woman of the Year, presented by Glendale Latino Association.
- 2019: Community Leader Courage Award, presented by The Guild at Adventist Health Glendale.
- 2021: Crown Jewel Award, presented by glendaleOUT.

== Personal life ==
Devine's husband was Arthur Devine. He died on September 9, 2021. Devine and her family live in Glendale.
