= Glendale, California =

- City
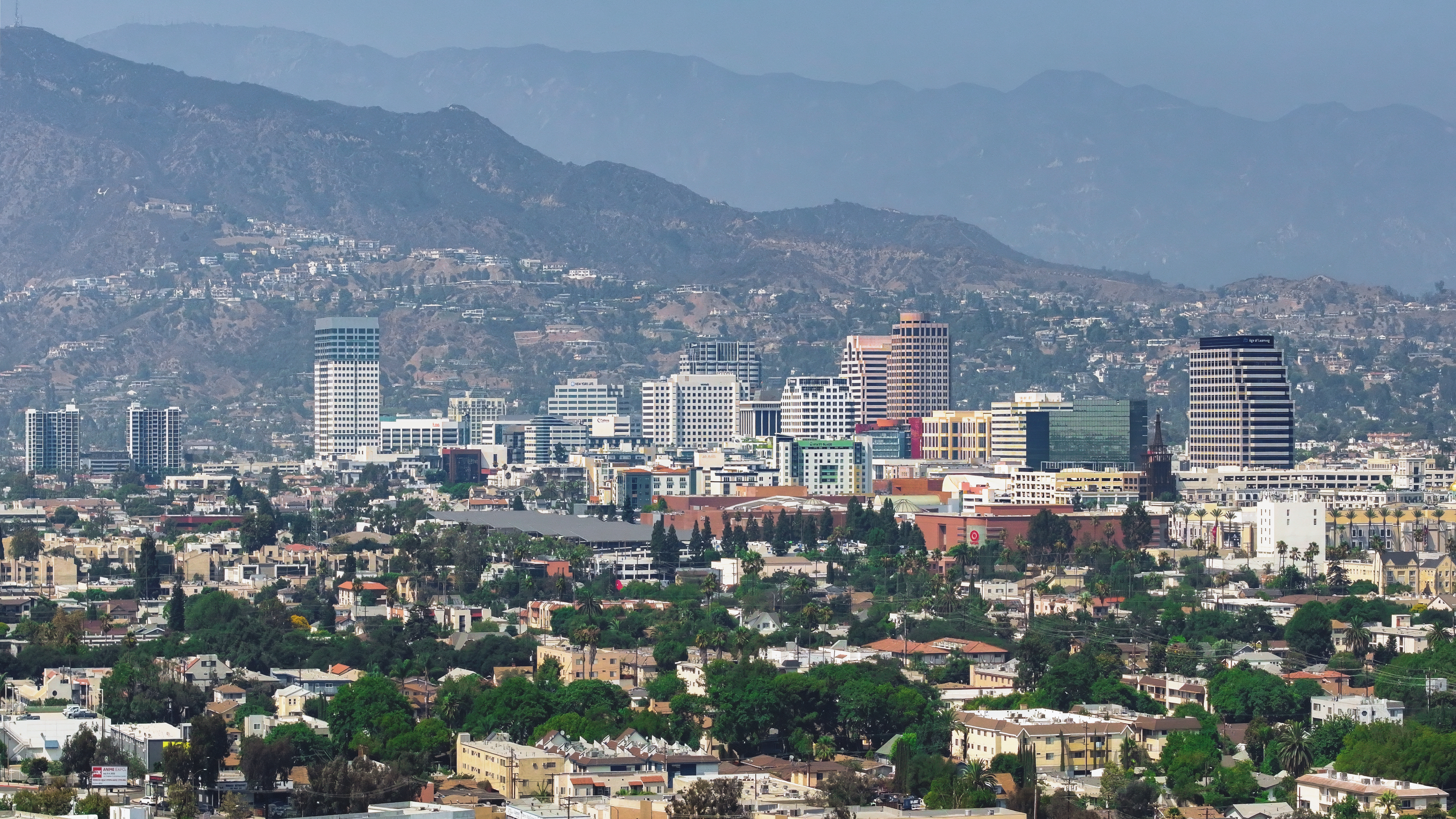
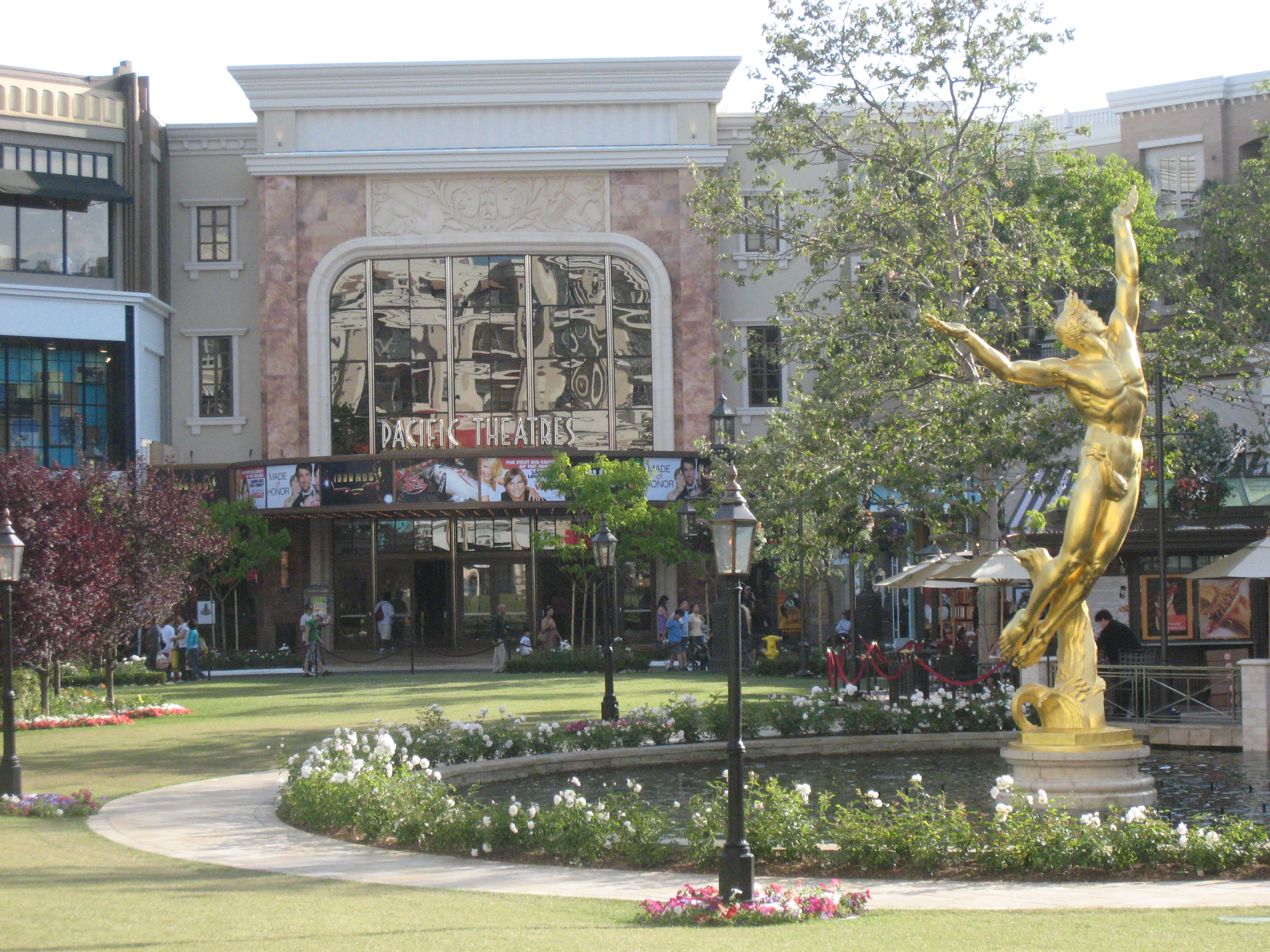
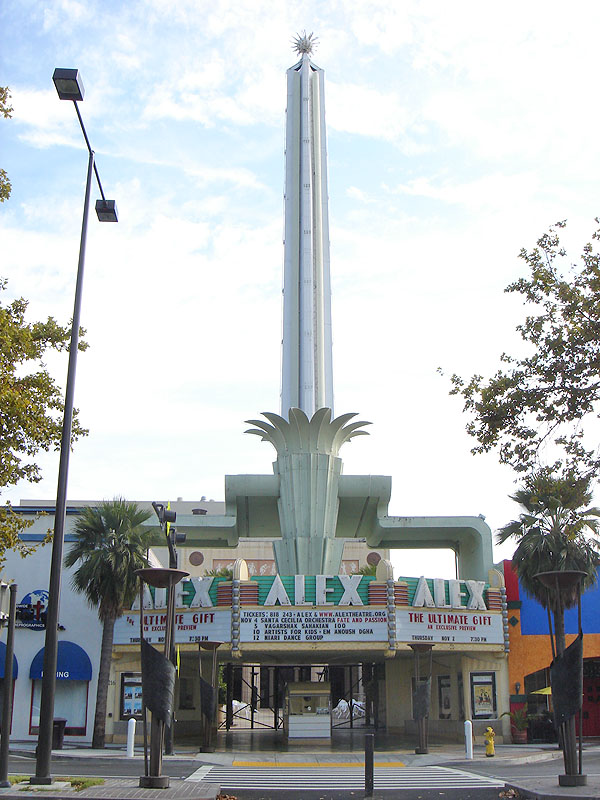
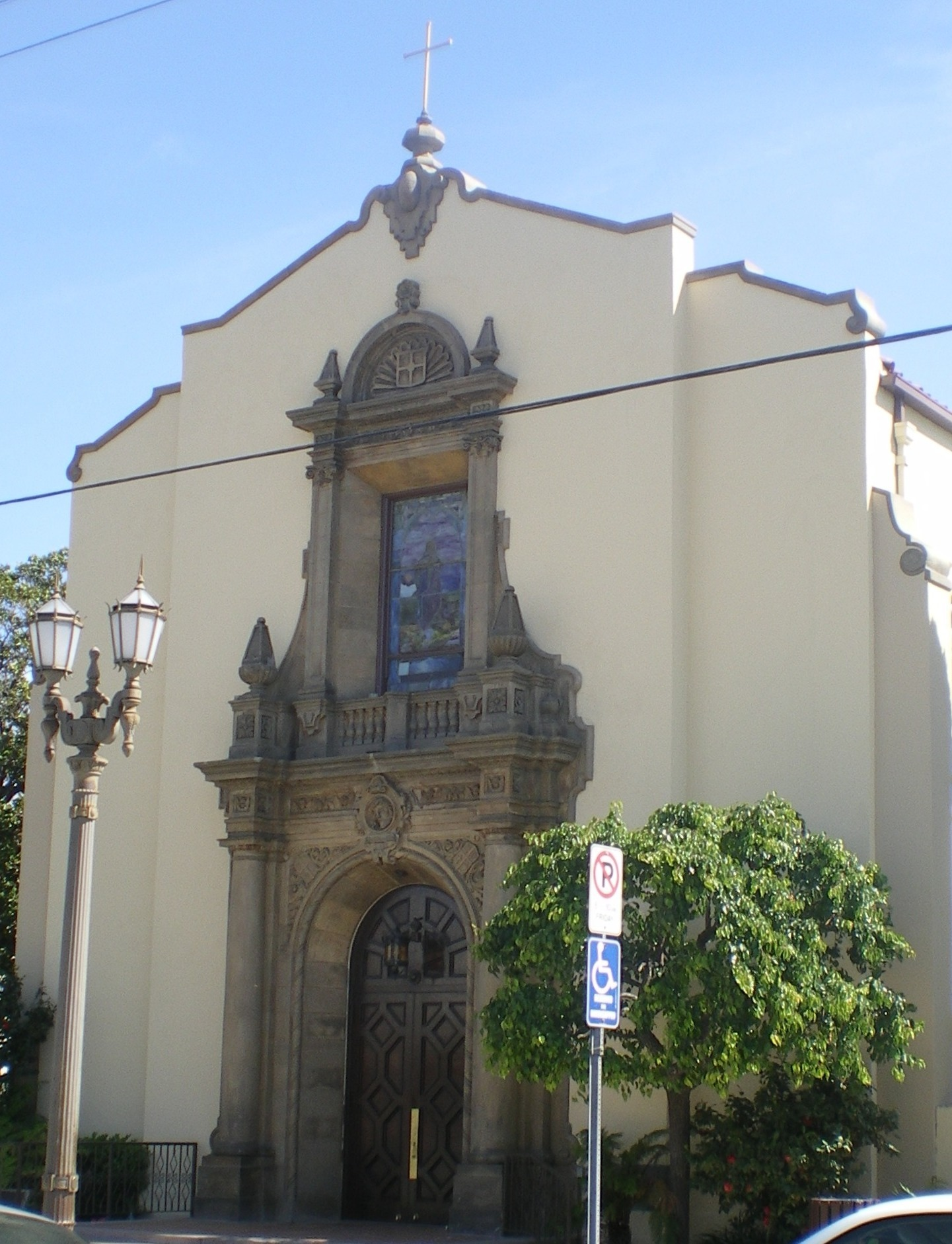
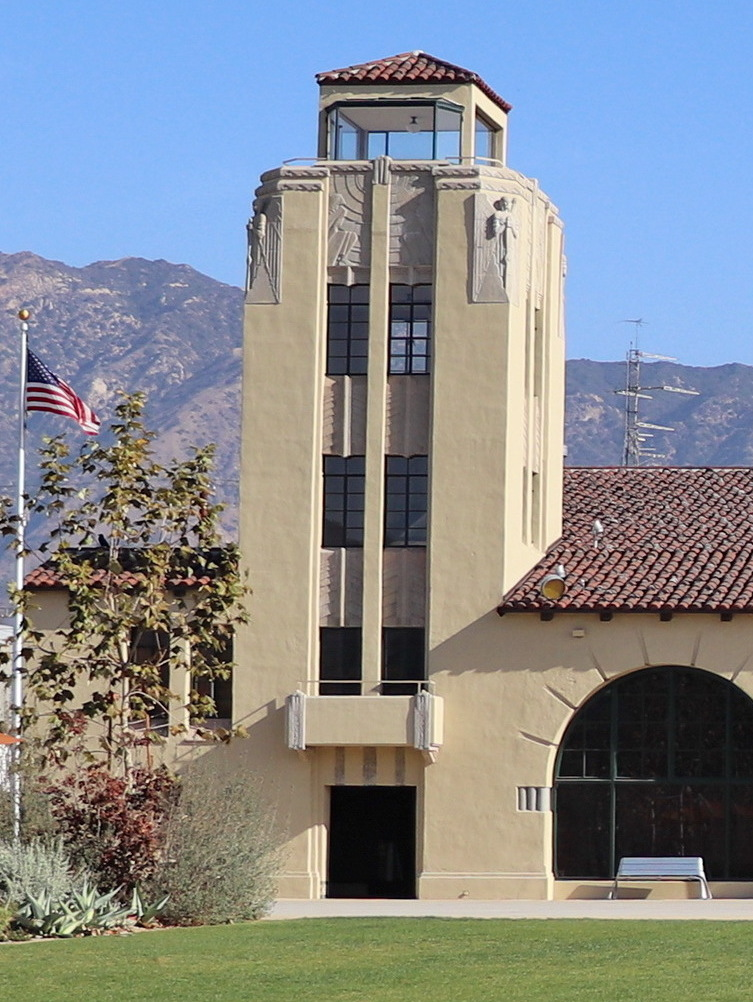
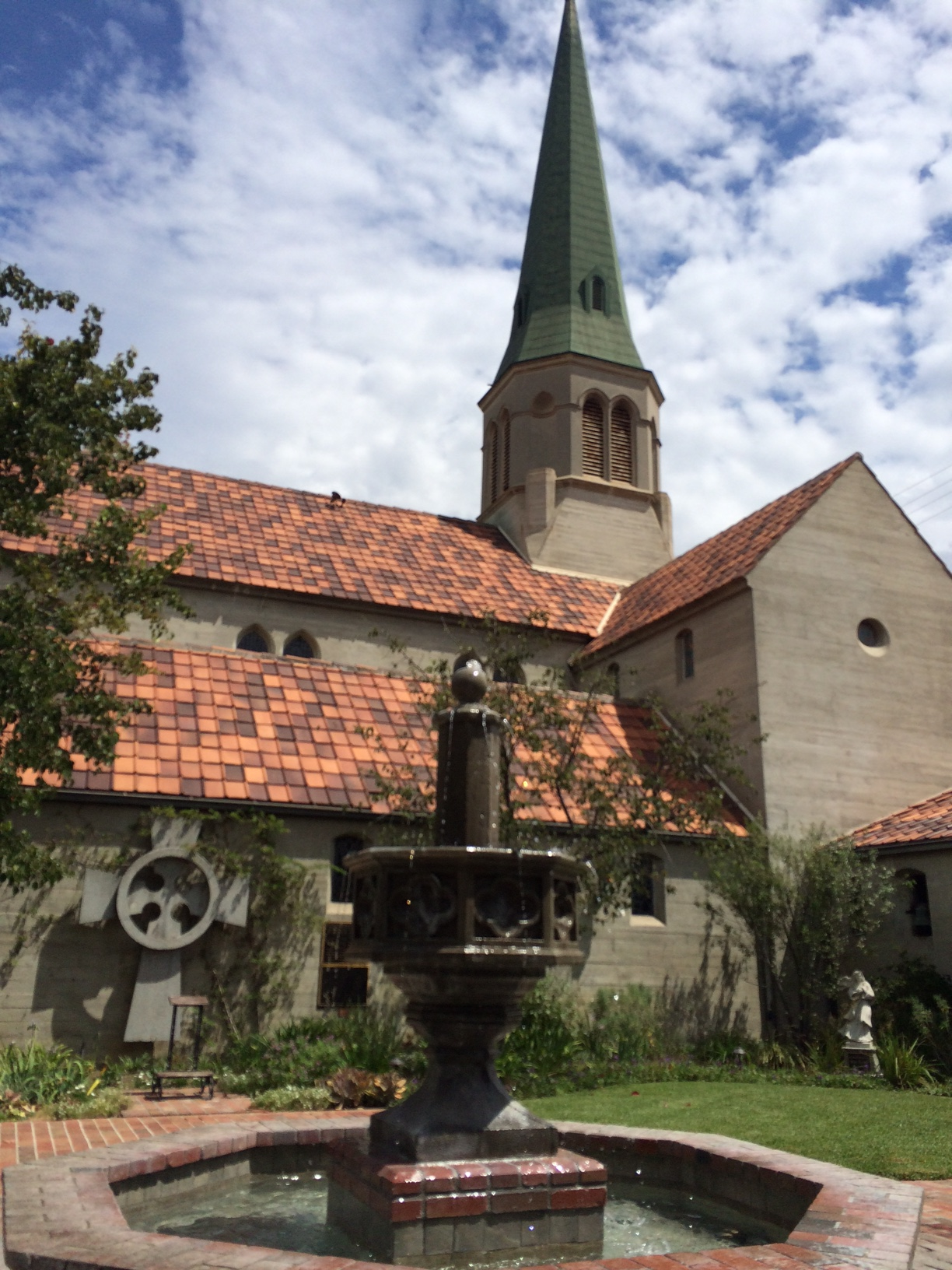
- Skyline Americana at Brand Alex Theatre Holy Family Catholic Church Grand Central Airport St. Mark's Episcopal Church

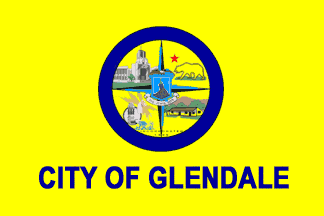
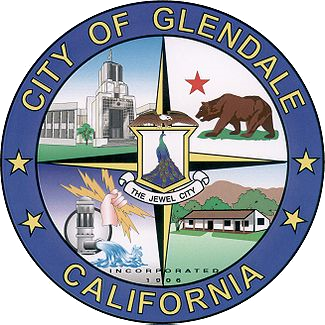
- Flag Seal
- Nickname: Jewel City
- Interactive map of Glendale, California
- Location within Metro Los Angeles Location within California Location within the United States
- Coordinates: 34°08′46″N 118°15′18″W
- Country: United States
- State: California
- County: Los Angeles
- Incorporated: February 15, 1906

Government
  - Type: Council-Manager
  - Mayor: Ardy Kassakhian (D)
  - City Council: Dan Brotman (N); Elen Asatryan (D, Current Term of Office: July 2026-June 2030); Vartan Gharpetian (N, Current Term of Office: April 2024-April 2028); Alek Bartrosouf (N)
  - City Treasurer: Rafi Manoukian (D)
  - City manager: Roubik Golanian
  - City Clerk: Suzie Abajian

Area
  - Total: 30.61 sq mi (79.27 km^{2})
  - Land: 30.48 sq mi (78.94 km^{2})
  - Water: 0.13 sq mi (0.33 km^{2}) 0.42%
- Elevation: 522 ft (159 m)

Population (2020)
  - Total: 196,543
  - Rank: 4th in Los Angeles County; 24th in California; 141st in the United States
  - Density: 6,449/sq mi (2,489.8/km^{2})
- Demonyms: Glendalian
- Time zone: UTC−8 (Pacific)
  - Summer (DST): UTC−7 (PDT)
- ZIP Codes: 91201–91210, 91214, 91221, 91222, 91224–91226
- Area code: 747 and 818
- FIPS code: 06-30000
- GNIS feature IDs: 1660679, 2410597
- Website: glendaleca.gov

Glendale is a city located primarily in the Verdugo Mountains region, with a small portion in the San Fernando Valley of Los Angeles County, California, United States. It is located approximately 10 miles (16 km) north of Downtown Los Angeles.

As of 2025, Glendale had a Census-estimated population of 187,823 making it the 4th-most populous city in Los Angeles County and the 24th-most populous city in California.

Glendale—along with neighboring city Burbank and nearby neighborhood Hollywood, Los Angeles—has served as a major production center for the Cinema of the United States, and especially animation, and is home to Disneytoon Studios, Marvel Animation, and DreamWorks Animation.

== History ==
=== Indigenous history ===
Native Americans lived along the Glendale Narrows of the Los Angeles River, known to the Tongva people as Paayme Paxaayt ("West River"), for thousands of years before the arrival of European settlers. Villages in the Glendale–La Crescenta-Montrose area included Ashwaangna, Hahamongna, Maungna, Tujunga and Wiqanga.

=== Spanish era ===
In 1769, the Portolá expedition established a permanent Spanish presence in the area. Many of the native inhabitants were displaced in 1771 for use as slave labor for the Mission San Gabriel Arcángel. This migration, together with European diseases such as syphilis, measles, and smallpox, depopulated their communities.

In 1784, José María Verdugo, a corporal in the Spanish army from Baja California, received the Rancho San Rafael from Pedro Fages, the Province of Las Californias' Lieutenant Governor, which was confirmed in 1798 by Governor Diego de Borica. Rancho San Rafael was a Spanish concession, of which 25 were made in California. Unlike the later Mexican land grants, the concessions were similar to grazing permits, with the title remaining with the Spanish crown.

In 1798, Verdugo retired from the military and began expanding his ranch operations. Soon he had nearly 2,000 head of cattle, 670 horses and 70 mules. With the help of his son, Julio, he built several adobe structures for various uses. Workers grew crops such as grains, peppers, oranges, figs, grapes and pomegranates, and also made wine.

=== Mexican era ===
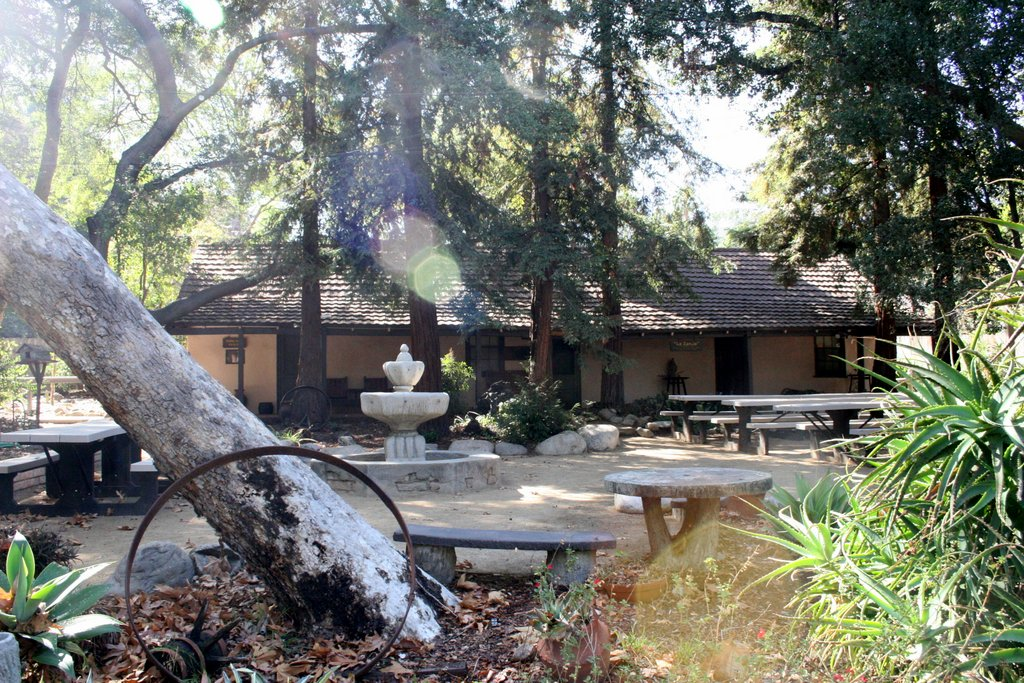
The Catalina Verdugo Adobe is the city's oldest building. Construction began in 1828.

The 1821 Treaty of Córdoba established Mexican independence from Spain at the end of the Mexican War of Independence.

When Jose Maria Verdugo died in 1831, his estate was divided between his son, Julio, and his daughter, Catalina.

In 1843, the Mexican government, claiming that the Verdugo family was not using the 5,832-acre portion of Rancho San Rafael situated in the Crescenta Valley to graze his herds, granted that portion to Ygnacio Coronel, who named it La Cañada Atras de Rancho Los Verdugos ("The Canyon Behind the Verdugo Ranch").

=== American era ===
The 1847 Treaty of Cahuenga established American control of Alta California at the end of the Mexican–American War. With the cession of California to the United States following the Mexican–American War, the 1848 Treaty of Guadalupe Hidalgo provided that the land grants would be honored. As required by the Land Act of 1851, a claim was filed with the Public Land Commission in 1852, confirmed by the Commission in 1855, and the grant was patented to Julio and Catalina Verdugo in 1882.

In 1861, Julio Verdugo took out a mortgage to build a larger house. Unable to make the loan payments, the family was forced into bankruptcy proceedings. In 1871, the court divided the ranch into several parcels to satisfy the many claims against the Verdugos.

The court gave Benjamin Dreyfus, of California, the largest allotment: more than 8,000 acres, which later became Eagle Rock and Tropico. Andrew Glassell and Alfred Chapman were awarded the great Rancho La Cañada and more than 2,000 acres of what is now Highland Park and York Valley. David Burbank was awarded 4,607 acres, and his property eventually became the neighboring city of Burbank.

The arrival of the railroad in Southern California set off a real estate boom. In 1883, soon after Atwater Village was settled, the Atwater Tract Office brought train service to the area. On March 11, 1887, Erskine Mayo Ross, Cameron E. Thom, and several others, filed the first plat for Glendale, described as "Pasadena's first and only rival." It was bounded by First Street (now Lexington Drive) on the north, Fifth Street (now Harvard Street) on the south, Central Avenue on the west, and the Childs Tract on the east.

==== Incorporation and growth ====
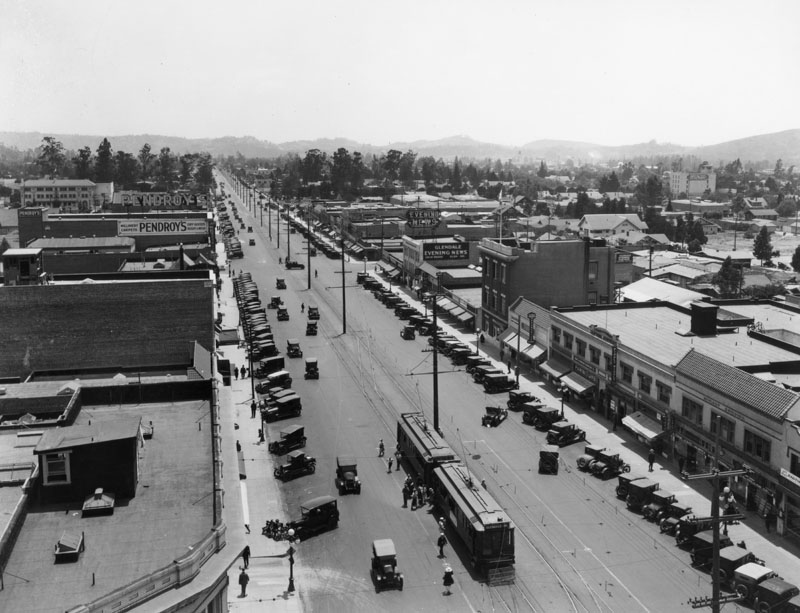
A Glendale–Burbank Line streetcar stops to pick up and drop off passengers in 1915.

The city officially incorporated in 1906. Also that year, Forest Lawn Cemetery opened.

An important civic booster of the era was Leslie Coombs Brand (1859–1925), who partnered with Henry E. Huntington to bring the Pacific Electric Railway, or the "Red Cars", to the area. The Glendale–Burbank Line, which was operational from 1904 to 1955, ran from Downtown Los Angeles to Burbank via Glendale. At the railroad dedication celebration, Brand spoke of "his early dreams coming true, in which he pictured a country home in close proximity to the city." Brand also owned Glendale Light & Power Company, the Miradero Water Company, and the Consolidated Water Company.

The architecture firm of Anderson and Murdock won a contract to construct a new city hall in 1910, and it was completed in 1912.

Pioneering endocrinologist and entrepreneur Henry R. Harrower opened his clinic in Glendale in 1920, which for many years was the largest business in the city.

Following the 1922 demolition of the Atwater Tract Office, Southern Pacific Railroad constructed the Glendale Southern Pacific Railroad Depot. Glendale was served by the Southern Pacific Railroad's Coast Daylight daytime and Lark overnight passenger trains.

The Hotel Glendale, a six-story beaux-arts building which boasted 160 rooms and two elevators, became Glendale's tallest building when it opened in 1925. Its location, at the intersection of Broadway and Glendale Avenue, was chosen because of its proximity to several transportation lines.

The Alexander Theatre opened in 1925, and featured vaudeville performances and silent films on a single screen.

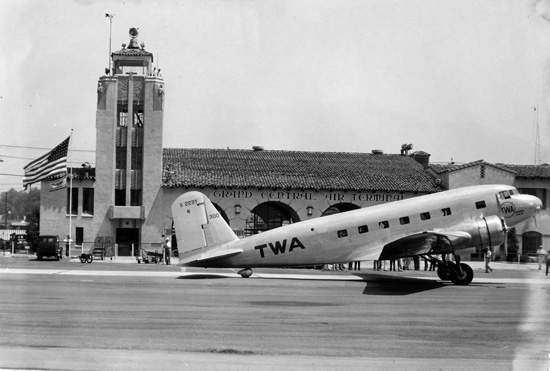
The Douglas DC-1 at Grand Central Airport, circa 1933

The Grand Central Airport opened in 1929. Within a year, the enterprise was sold to the Curtiss-Wright Flying Service, managed by C. C. Moseley, a co-founder of the future Western Airlines. It became the city's largest employer. It was also at Grand Central that Moseley established the first of his private flying schools, Curtiss-Wright Technical Institute (later renamed Cal-Aero Academy).

The Renaissance Revival-style Glendale Main Post Office opened in 1934.

Between 1935 and 1937, the Works Progress Administration, under the supervision of the United States Army Corps of Engineers, channelized the Verdugo Wash and built ten bridges over it. Other Works Progress Administration projects include Glendale Community College's John A. Davitt Administration Building (1937) and the Glendale Civic Auditorium (1938).

==== Second World War and post-war development ====
The Second World War proved to be a boon to Glendale as Southern California became a major staging area for the Pacific War. Grand Central Airport served as a training facility for pilots and mechanics, while a foundry on San Fernando Road produced airplane parts. The Grayson Power Plant entered service in 1941, providing the city energy independence. Also that year, the city launched a municipal bus system named Glendale City Lines. In 1942, a new Glendale City Hall, a Works Progress Administration project in the PWA Moderne style, was completed in Glendale Civic Center, on the site of Glendale's first permanent city hall from 1912. In 1943, the Los Angeles County Superior Court opened a courthouse in Glendale.

In 1948, the Glendale News-Press moved to a new, 35,000-square-foot building across the street from City Hall.

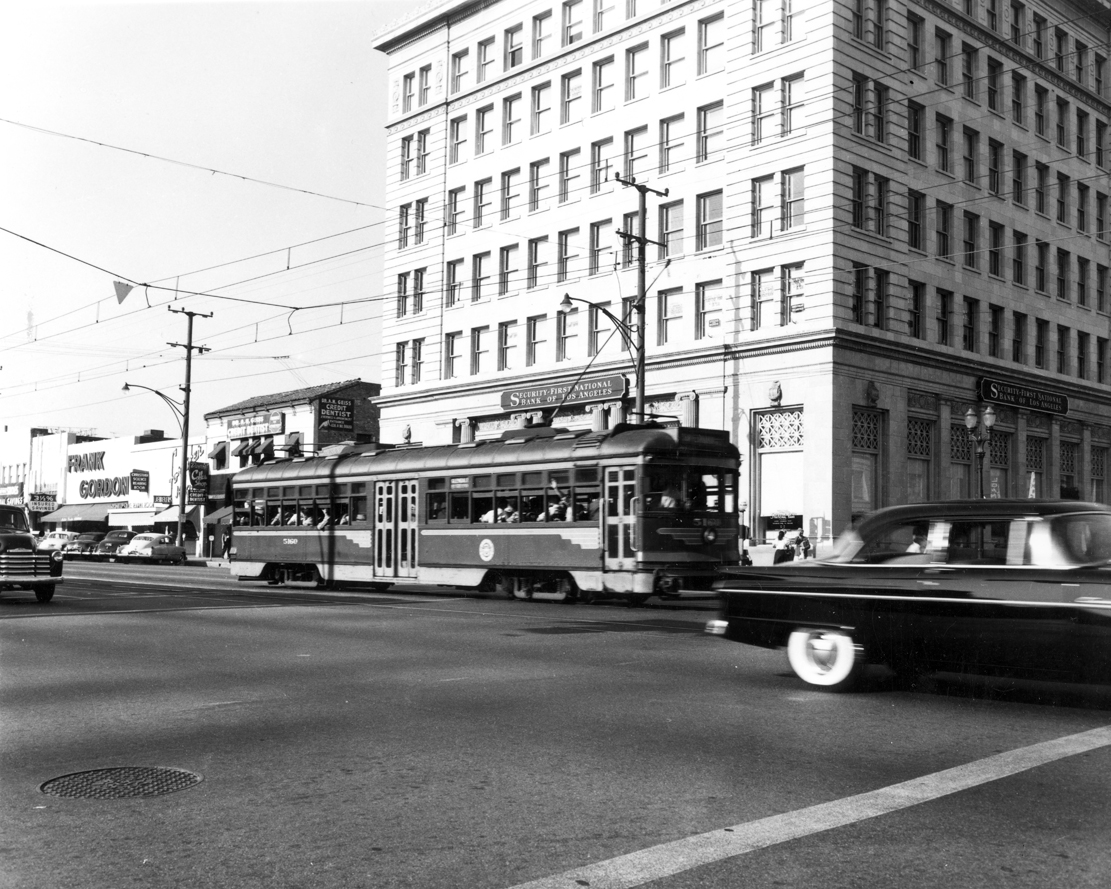
Last day of Glendale–Burbank Line service (June 19, 1955)

In October 1953, the Glendale–Burbank Line came under the purview of Metropolitan Coach Lines, which initiated a series of service reductions. Interurban service ended in 1955, bringing an end to Glendale's streetcar suburb era.

With the proliferation of jet aircraft, Grand Central Airport's relatively short 3,400-foot runway was unable to accommodate modern aircraft. In 1959, the airport shut down. In 1961, Walt Disney purchased a large portion of the closed airport to establish a creative workshop for employees working on the construction of Disney theme parks and attractions worldwide. Initially named WED Enterprises, the team came to be known as Walt Disney Imagineering.

Until as late as the 1960s, Glendale was a sundown town, which meant that non-white people were required to leave city limits by a certain time each day or risk arrest and possible violence. This was achieved through, among other methods, racist housing covenants and police intimidation.

In 1964, Glendale was selected by George Lincoln Rockwell to be the West Coast headquarters of the American Nazi Party. In 1965, an anti-Nazi political demonstration co-sponsored by several groups — Christians Against Bigotry, Anti-Nazi Congress of America, and Jewish Survivors of Concentration Camps — featured actor Ronald Reagan as a speaker. The Los Angeles County Board of Supervisors became involved, amending a law regarding the activities of subversive groups, which was originally drafted in 1941 to control the German American Bund. After a legal battle with the city of Glendale, the party moved their headquarters to El Monte in 1966.

==== Demographic changes and urbanization ====
The emergence of increasingly visible ethnic groups—including Armenians, Cubans, Filipinos and Koreans—changed the official discourse in Glendale. In 1972, C.E. Perkins, then city manager, encouraged the Rotary Club of Glendale to prepare itself as the city could no longer remain isolated in an increasingly diverse America. Through the 1970s, concurrent with increasing immigration into Glendale, was the city's rapid urbanization. During this era, the Glendale Freeway and the Ventura Freeway were constructed. The Glendale Galleria shopping mall opened in 1976, and was further expanded in 1982.

In the 1980s, many single-family homes in south Glendale were demolished for apartment and condominium construction. This construction boom resulted in Glendale's population growing at a rate 60% higher than that of the county at large, turning the city into a denser, younger and more cosmopolitan urban center. In 1983, Larry Zarian was elected as the city's first Armenian city council member, and in 1986, he became the city's first Armenian mayor. In 1984, the city revived municipal bus service with the Glendale Beeline.

By 1990, Glendale was, proportionately, more immigrant than either the city or county of Los Angeles, with 45% of its residents being foreign-born. By the mid-1990s, Glendale's Anglo-American population had been surpassed by Armenians and Latinos. Some Anglo-American residents, largely fueled by anti-immigrant sentiment, decried the increased density in South Glendale.

==== Recent history ====
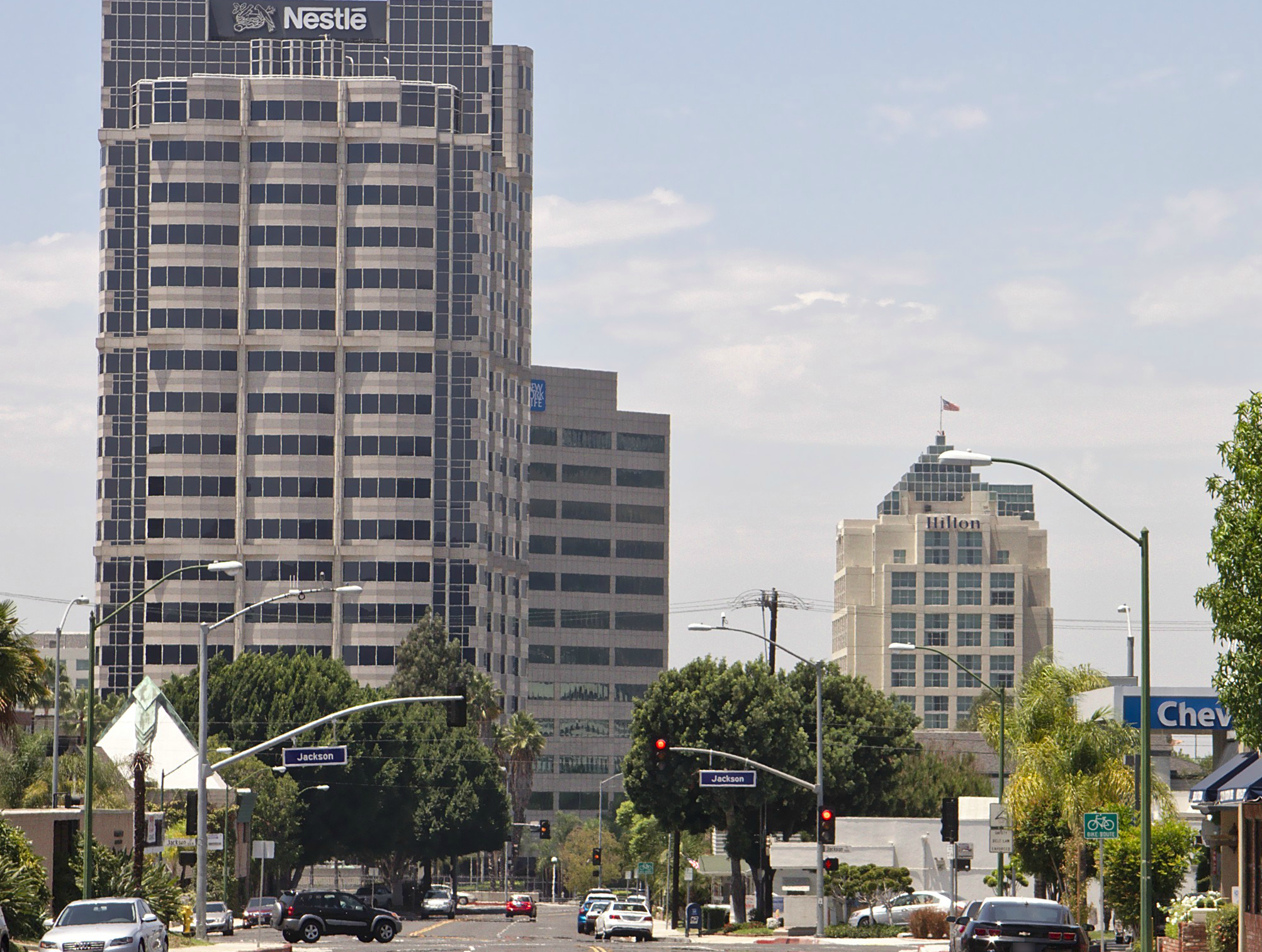
High-rises in Downtown Glendale

On January 26, 2005, a train crash occurred when a southbound Metrolink commuter train collided with a sport utility vehicle that had been abandoned on the tracks immediately south of the Chevy Chase Drive grade crossing, on the Glendale-Los Angeles border. The train jackknifed and struck trains on either side of it — one a stationary Union Pacific freight train, and the other a northbound Metrolink train traveling in the opposite direction. The collision caused the deaths of 11 individuals and injured 177 more.

By the late 2000s, Glendale had outgrown its "sleepy bedroom community" reputation as an urban area of its own, in large part due to the Americana at Brand lifestyle center and residential community. The new development was opened to the public in 2008, featuring 75 shops, restaurants, apartments, condominiums, and an 18-plex cinema.

In response to the Americana at Brand's opening, the Glendale Galleria underwent an extensive renovation in 2012. By 2014, the construction of thousands of luxury apartments in downtown Glendale raised fears of gentrification. In 2016, the Museum of Neon Art's new location opened. The post-Americana development boom has also included several hotels, such as a Hampton Inn & Suites (2016), a Hyatt Place (2017), The Glenmark (2020) and a Hotel Indigo (2025). There has also been an increase in "luxury wellness" in Glendale, including an Erewhon grocery store, "a stone's throw from a lower-cost competitor, Whole Foods Market."

In 2021, the Armenian American Museum broke ground in Central Park. In 2024, the Martial Arts History Museum moved to an 8,000 square foot facility in downtown Glendale, the latest piece in the "new 'museum row' now that Glendale has the Neon Museum, the Armenian Museum and now the Martial Arts History Museum."

== Geography ==
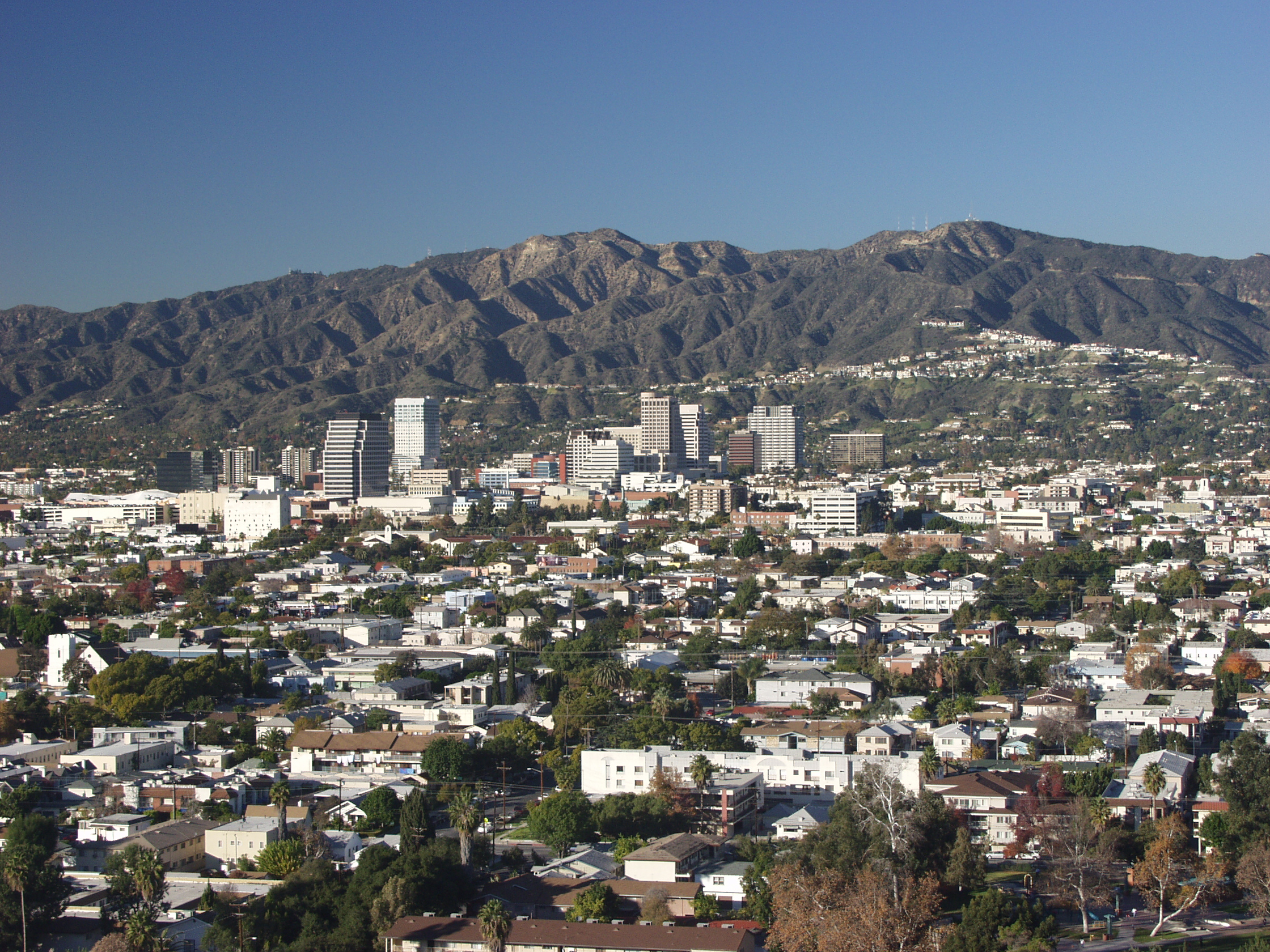
View of Glendale with the San Gabriel Mountains and the Verdugo Mountains in the background

Glendale is located in the southeastern San Fernando Valley, 10 miles (16 km) north of downtown Los Angeles. According to the United States Census Bureau, the city has a total area of 30.6 mi^{2} (79.212 km^{2}); 30.5 square miles (79 km^{2}) is land and 0.13 square miles (0.34 km^{2}) (0.43%) is covered by water. Glendale is the fourth largest city within Los Angeles County.

Glendale is bordered to the north by the foothill communities of La Cañada Flintridge, La Crescenta, and Tujunga; to the south by the Atwater Village and Glassell Park communities incorporated by the city of Los Angeles; to the east by Pasadena and Eagle Rock (also incorporated within Los Angeles); and to the west by Griffith Park and the city of Burbank.

=== Geology ===
Several known earthquake faults criss-cross the Glendale area and adjacent mountains, as in much of Southern California. Among the more recognized faults are the Sierra Madre and Hollywood faults, situated in the city's northern and southwestern portions, respectively. Additionally, the Verdugo and Raymond faults intersect through the city's central and southeastern areas. The San Gabriel fault, meanwhile, is located northeast of the city. Roughly 75 miles (121 km) northeast of Glendale is a major portion of the San Andreas Fault known as the "Big Bend", where quake-recurrence tracking shows major activity roughly every 140–160 years. The closest portion of the San Andreas is actually 29 miles (47 km) from Glendale. The last major quake along the southern San Andreas was recorded in 1857.

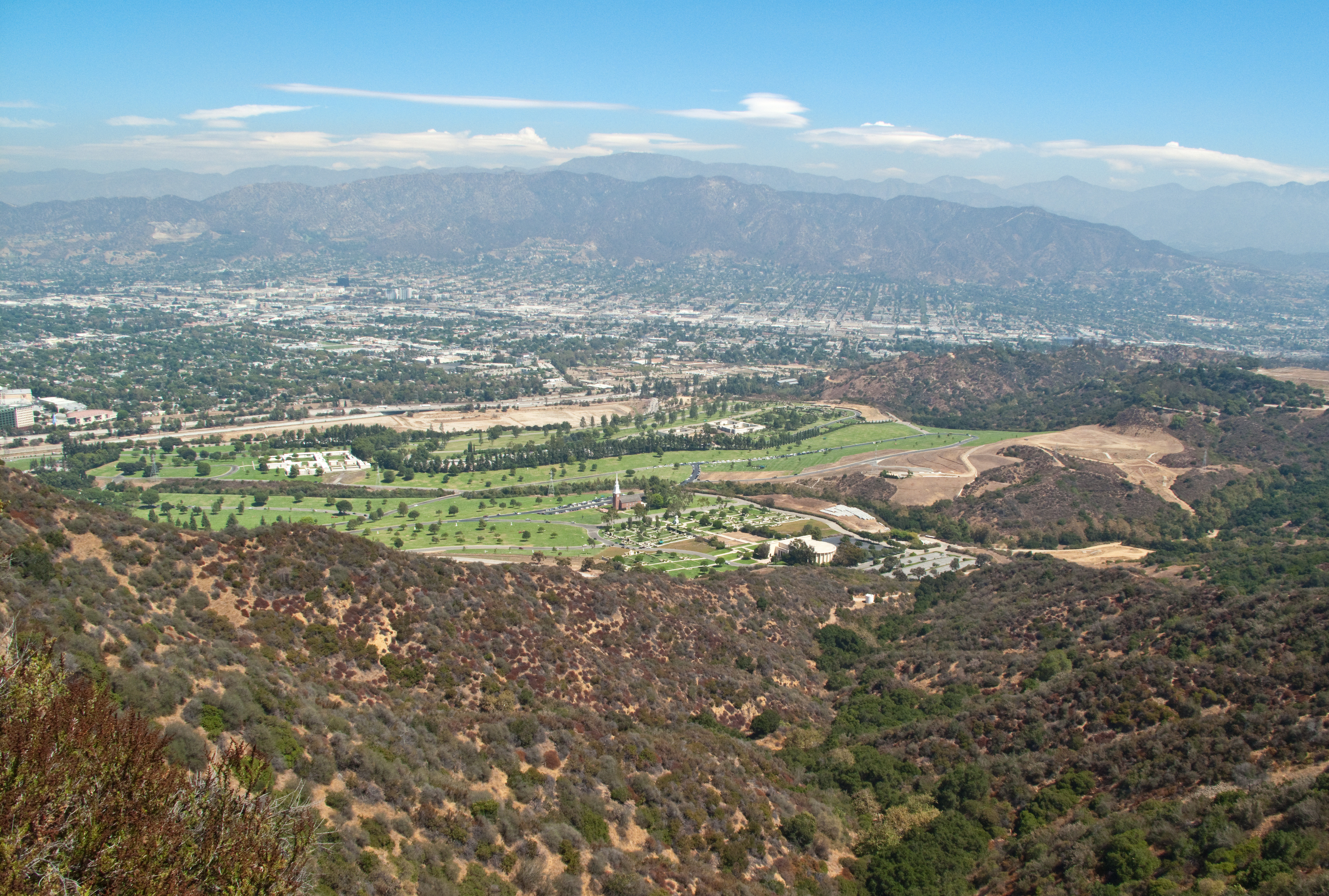
Forest Lawn Memorial Park and the Verdugo Mountains

In the 1971 San Fernando earthquake, which took place along the western edge of the Sierra Madre Fault, surface ruptures were nearly 12 miles (19 km) long, including one portion a few miles northwest of Glendale. Most of the damage was in the northern San Fernando Valley, though 31 structures in Glendale suffered major damage and had to be demolished, plus numerous chimneys collapsed. The 1994 Northridge earthquake had an epicenter about 18 miles (29 km) from Glendale. The city suffered severe damage to a public parking structure and sections of the Glendale Galleria parking structures and exterior columns incurred damages.

=== Climate ===
Glendale has a Mediterranean climate (Köppen climate classification: Csa), with hot summers and mild winters with occasional rainfall. The highest recorded temperature in Glendale was 115 °F (46 °C) on September 6, 2020. The lowest recorded temperature was 17 °F (−8 °C) on February 15, 1990. The warmest month is August and the coolest month is January.

The annual average precipitation is just over 21 inches (530 mm), mostly falling between November and April. Rainfall totals are highly variable from year to year, with the wettest years (sometimes over 30 inches (760 mm) of rainfall) usually associated with warm El Niño conditions, and the drier years (sometimes under 10 inches (250 mm) of rainfall) with cool La Niña episodes in the Pacific.

The hills and mountains of northern Glendale very rarely have snow, owing to its warmer temperatures during the winter. Frost sometimes occurs at night from late November to early March. Heavy rains and thunderstorms are also common during the winter. The spring brings temperate weather, with little rain. The summer is usually fairly warm, with highs from 85 °F (29 °C), to the low 100s (40 °C). Summer is usually very dry, but thunderstorms can come from Arizona, bringing high humidity into the area. These rare days cause heat indices over 120 °F (49 °C). Fall often brings clear and dry weather, but can be gusty due to the Santa Ana winds, blowing in once or twice a year from October to December. Santa Ana winds can reach up to 70 miles per hour (110 km/h), with gusts up to 100 miles per hour (160 km/h) in mountain passes and canyons. Thunderstorms occur very rarely and they are accompanied by gusty winds and hail.

Climate data for Glendale, California
Month	Jan	Feb	Mar	Apr	May	Jun	Jul	Aug	Sep	Oct	Nov	Dec	Year
Record high °F (°C)	93 (34)	92 (33)	96 (36)	105 (41)	102 (39)	110 (43)	110 (43)	107 (42)	115 (46)	110 (43)	98 (37)	93 (34)	115 (46)
Mean daily maximum °F (°C)	68 (20)	70 (21)	70 (21)	75 (24)	76 (24)	82 (28)	87 (31)	88 (31)	86 (30)	81 (27)	74 (23)	69 (21)	77 (25)
Mean daily minimum °F (°C)	45 (7)	47 (8)	48 (9)	51 (11)	55 (13)	59 (15)	62 (17)	63 (17)	62 (17)	56 (13)	49 (9)	45 (7)	54 (12)
Record low °F (°C)	23 (−5)	17 (−8)	23 (−5)	34 (1)	37 (3)	41 (5)	45 (7)	48 (9)	44 (7)	37 (3)	29 (−2)	26 (−3)	17 (−8)
Average precipitation inches (mm)	3.74 (95)	4.19 (106)	3.56 (90)	0.90 (23)	0.34 (8.6)	0.08 (2.0)	0.02 (0.51)	0.15 (3.8)	0.35 (8.9)	0.49 (12)	1.26 (32)	2.10 (53)	17.17 (436)
Source 1:
Source 2:

=== Surrounding areas ===
Los Angeles
Los Angeles La Crescenta-Montrose / La Cañada Flintridge
Burbank La Cañada Flintridge / Pasadena
Los Angeles Pasadena / Los Angeles
Los Angeles

== Demographics ==
Historical population
Census	Pop.	Note	%±
1910	2,746		—
1920	13,536		392.9%
1930	62,736		363.5%
1940	82,582		31.6%
1950	95,702		15.9%
1960	119,442		24.8%
1970	132,664		11.1%
1980	139,060		4.8%
1990	180,038		29.5%
2000	194,973		8.3%
2010	191,719		−1.7%
2020	196,543		2.5%
2024 (est.)	187,823	▼	−4.4%
U.S. Decennial Census; 1860–1870 1880–1890; 1900 1910 1920; 1930 1940 1950; 1960 1970 1980; 1990 2000 2010; 2020

Glendale first appeared as a city in the 1910 U.S. census part of the now defunct Burbank Township (pop 3,018 in 1900).

=== 2024 estimates ===
As of 2024, Glendale hosts a Census-estimated population of 187,823, down 8,720 (–4.4%) from the 2020 United States census count of 196,543. At the 2020 census, the age distribution was 22.9% under 18, 58.7% from 18 to 64, and 18.4% who were 65 or older.

As of 2021, Glendale's population includes:

- 54,000 children under the age of 18 years,
- 10,100 women who live alone,
- 7,000 men who live alone, and
- 730 women and men who are in same-sex relationships, either as married or unmarried couples.

=== Race and ethnicity ===
Glendale, California – Racial and ethnic composition Note: the US Census treats Hispanic/Latino as an ethnic category. This table excludes Latinos from the racial categories and assigns. them to a separate category. Hispanics/Latinos may be of any race.
Race / Ethnicity (NH = Non-Hispanic)	Pop 1980	Pop 1990	Pop 2000	Pop 2010	Pop 2020	% 1980	% 1990	% 2000	% 2010	% 2020
White alone (NH)	104,989	114,765	105,597	117,929	122,519	75.50%	63.74%	54.16%	61.51%	62.34%
Black or African American alone (NH)	431	2,065	2,230	2,325	3,365	0.31%	1.15%	1.14%	1.21%	1.71%
Native American or Alaska Native alone (NH)	700	473	293	192	203	0.50%	0.26%	0.15%	0.10%	0.10%
Asian alone (NH)	7,928	24,673	31,227	31,073	29,461	5.70%	13.70%	16.02%	16.21%	14.99%
Native Hawaiian or Pacific Islander alone (NH)	7,928	24,673	143	105	120	5.70%	13.70%	0.07%	0.05%	0.06%
Other race alone (NH)	295	331	370	366	709	0.21%	0.18%	0.19%	0.19%	0.36%
Mixed race or Multiracial (NH)	x	x	16,661	6,315	6,591	x	x	8.55%	3.29%	3.35%
Hispanic or Latino (any race)	24,717	37,731	38,452	33,414	33,575	17.77%	20.96%	19.72%	17.43%	17.08%
Total	139,060	180,038	194,973	191,719	196,543	100.00%	100.00%	100.00%	100.00%	100.00%

==== Armenians ====
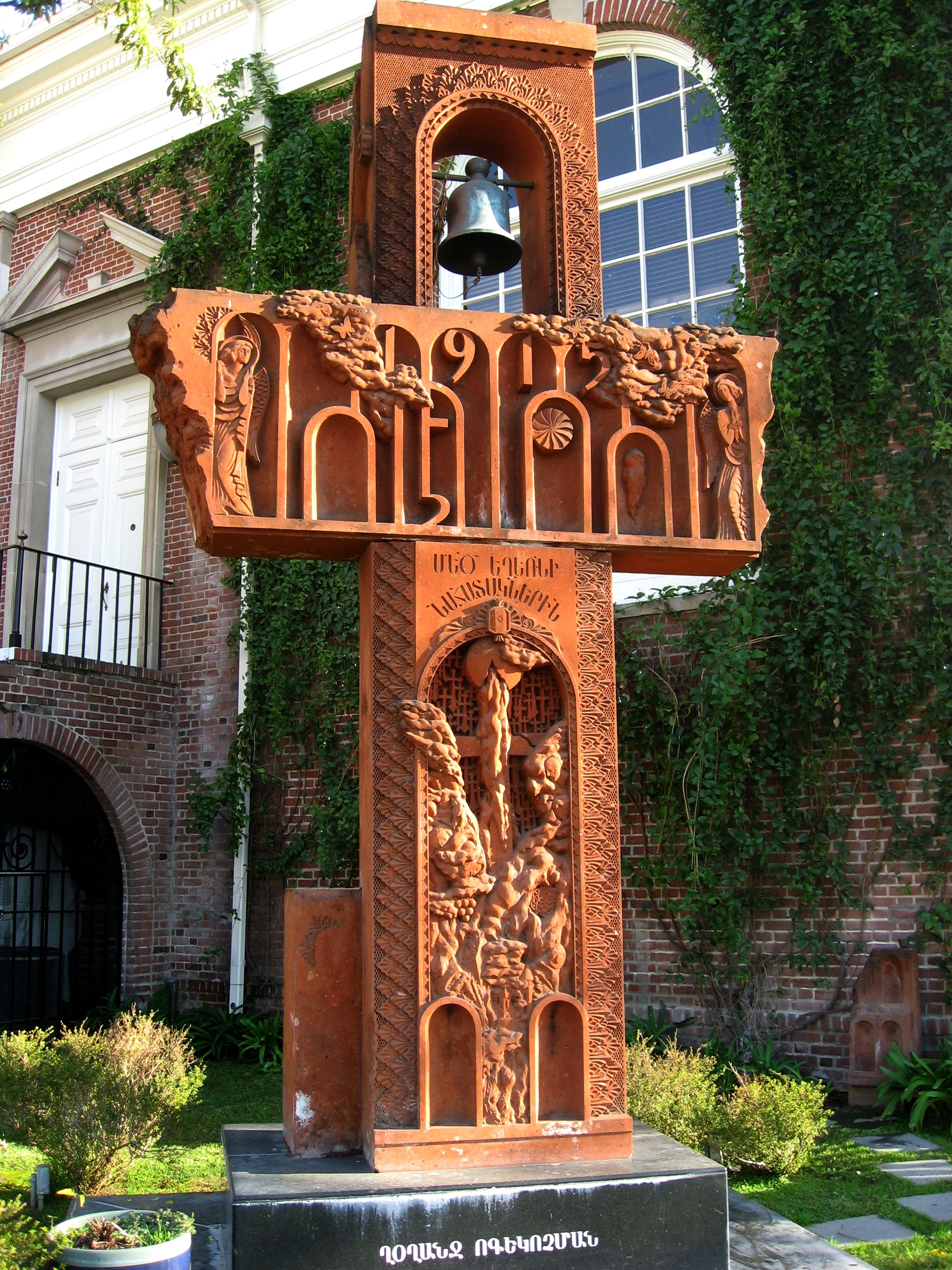
Armenian genocide memorial

Glendale has one of the largest communities of Armenian descent in the United States.

===== History =====
Armenian families have lived in the city since the 1920s, but the surge in immigration accelerated in the 1970s. Armenian Americans are well integrated into the city, with many businesses, several Armenian schools, and ethnic/cultural organizations serving this ethnic group. Beginning in the late 1970s, as a result of the Lebanese Civil War and the Iranian Revolution, a dramatic influx of Lebanese Armenians and Iranian Armenians began to arrive in Glendale.

Beginning in the late 1980s, with assistance from family and friends already there, Armenians from the former Soviet Union began arriving. In the Glendale Unified School District, by 1988, along with students from the Middle East, they had become the largest ethnic group in the public schools, now having a larger number than Latinos.

By 1999, about 25% of the population spoke Armenian and there were many Armenian businesses.

According to the United States 2000 Census, Glendale is home to 65,343 Armenian Americans (making up 34.1% of the total population), increasing from 1990 when there were 31,402 Armenian Americans in the city. As of 2005, one-third of Los Angeles' estimated 153,000 Armenians (or 51,000, around a quarter of Glendale's 205,000 residents) lived in Glendale. At that time, Armenians held a majority on the Glendale city council, and it had done so since that year. By 2005, the Armenian population was 40% of the total population.

In 2014, a Glendale Police Department spokesperson, stated, "In five to eight years, the [Armenian] community went from a few thousand to about 40,000." Levon Marashlian, an instructor of Armenian history at Glendale College, stated that in the early 1990s Glendale's Armenian community became the largest in the Los Angeles metropolitan area, surpassing the Armenian community of Hollywood. Alice Petrossian, the GUSD director of intercultural education, stated that Burbank lies within the middle of other Armenian communities, so it attracted Armenians. There are also a great number of Armenian immigrants from Iran who, due to the religious restrictions and lifestyle limitations of the Islamic government, immigrated to the US, many to Glendale since it was where their relatives resided.

===== Organizations =====
In 1994, a new headquarters of the Armenian National Committee of America-Western Region opened in Glendale. ANCA Chairman Raffi Hamparian stated "One could look at it cynically and say they're coming because this is an election year, but on the other hand[,] the Armenian community has a lot of friends, because we're active in the public life of many cities[.]" In 2004, the Armenian Cultural Foundation started planning for an educational and recreational youth center in south Glendale. In 2009, upon the center's completion, the various Armenian Revolutionary Federation-aligned organizations—such as the Armenian National Committee of America, the Armenian Relief Society, the Armenian Youth Federation and Hamazkayin—moved to this new facility.

The Armenian Assembly of America's Western Region office is in Glendale.

The Armenian General Benevolent Union serves Glendale through its Pasadena-based Pasadena-Glendale chapter.

Homenetmen, a non-aligned sport and scouting organization, started its Glendale Ararat chapter in 1983. Since 1996, the chapter has been located in neighboring Glassell Park.

==== Other ethnic groups ====
The Mexican American community was established in Glendale by the 1960s. The late 1980s and early 1990s also saw increases in Mexican American population as Glendale offers higher-quality education in a safer suburban environment away from the city.

Several Korean cities have sought to create business and cultural relationships with Glendale. Central Park has a monument to commemorate Korean comfort women of World War II. It was the only such monument on the West Coast until the opening of the San Francisco Comfort Women Memorial in 2017.

As of 2012, Filipino Americans were the third largest minority group in Glendale, making up seven percent of the city's total population, overtaking Korean Americans. In 2022, the Filipino American Friendship Monument was unveiled in Central Park.

After the Iranian Revolution, many Iranians migrated to the cities seeking a suburban city with lower crime and quality education.

=== Religion ===
There is a large Christian, especially Oriental Orthodox, community in Glendale. St. Mark's Episcopal Church dates back to 1888, with the current building being built in 1948. Holy Family Catholic Church dates back to 1907, with the current building consecrated in 1922.

Since 1975, St. Mary's Armenian Apostolic Church has served Glendale. The Cathedral of Saint Gregory the Illuminator was consecrated in 2001. In 2012, the North American diocese of the Armenian Catholic Church moved from New York City to Glendale.

Other religious places of worship include the Islamic Center of Glendale, a Sunni mosque and Temple Sinai, a Reform synagogue.

=== LGBT+ community ===
Since at least the 1960s, there has been an LGBT+ community in the Adams Hill neighborhood. The neighborhood was home to Matthew Schmidt and Albert Antunes, known as "Matthew and Buddy of Glendale," who were known to host costume parties for the community.

Since 1986, Moonlight Rollerway has hosted a weekly "Rainbow Skate" roller skating event.

Since 2022, glendaleOUT has hosted the annual Glendale Pride in the Park event held at Adams Square Mini-Park. The event, a family-friendly picnic, is a privately organized event which has faced difficulty in securing financial support from the City of Glendale.

At the June 6, 2023 Glendale Unified School District Board of Education meeting, where an annual Pride Month declaration was to occur, a crowd of more than 200 — including far-right organizations such as the Proud Boys — gathered outside the Glendale Unified School District headquarters. As tensions between pro- and anti-LGBT+ sides rose, the Glendale Police Department declared an unlawful assembly. The incident has been seen as part of the broader 2020s anti-LGBTQ movement in the United States.

In 2026, the city achieved two milestones: its first Pride parade and its first openly LGBT+ municipal elected official, Alek Bartrosouf.

==== LGBT+ organizations ====
Since 2019, glendaleOUT has advocated on behalf of Glendale's LGBT+ residents. Since 2025, Glendale has its own PFLAG chapter. Though it serves all of Los Angeles County, GALAS LGBTQ+ Armenian Society has been recognized as a community leader by Glendale elected officials for their support for the local Armenian LGBT+ community.

== Economy ==
As of 2024, the top employers in the city are (with number of employees):

#	Employer	# of Employees
1	Glendale Unified School District	4,000
2	Service Titan	2,900
3	Adventist Health Glendale	2,550
4	City of Glendale	1,985
5	All in One, Inc	1,895
6	Countrywide Home Loans	1,815
7	Glenair Inc.	1,770
8	Glendale Community College	1,500
9	Walt Disney Imagineering	1,010
10	DreamWorks Animation	932

=== Aviation ===
Grand Central Airport was a municipal airport developed from 1923 which became the largest employer in Glendale for many years, and contributed to the development of aviation in the United States in many important ways. The main terminal building still stands as part of the Walt Disney Imagineering campus, and includes both Art Deco and Spanish-style architectural elements. The facility was the first official terminal for the Los Angeles area, as well as the departure point for the first commercial west-to-east transcontinental flight flown by Charles Lindbergh. During World War II, the Grand Central Air Terminal building was camouflaged to protect it from enemy targeting. It was closed down in 1959, and made way for the Grand Central Business Centre, an industrial park.

=== Film and television industry ===
Glendale, along with neighboring Burbank, has served as a major production center for the American film industry and especially animation.

Located near Walt Disney's Hyperion studio in Los Feliz, the Alex Theatre was Disney's favorite place during the 1930s to gauge audience reactions to his cartoons. Following his death in 1966, Disney was interred at Forest Lawn Memorial Park.

When The Walt Disney Company outgrew its Burbank studio lot in the early 1960s, it expanded to Glendale's Grand Central Business Centre. First came the headquarters for Imagineering, and from 1985 to 1995, during the Disney Renaissance, Walt Disney Animation Studios (then known as Walt Disney Feature Animation) was headquartered in the Grand Central Business Centre. Disneytoon Studios, a division of WDAS, is still located in the Grand Central Business Centre near GC3, along with the Animation Research Library, Disney Animation's archive. Today, Disney's Grand Central Creative Campus (known as GC3 for short) is also home to Consumer Products, Disney Interactive, Marvel Animation and The Muppets Studio. Disney-owned KABC-TV is located on Circle 7 Drive to the south of GC3.

Between 1991 and 2006, Universal Cartoon Studios was located in Glendale.

In 1992, Disney and Warner Bros. animator and director Darrell Van Citters and his business partner Ashley Postlewaite founded Renegade Animation in neighboring Burbank, and it soon moved to Glendale.

In 1994, Steven Spielberg, Jeffrey Katzenberg, and David Geffen formed DreamWorks SKG, a diversified entertainment company. DreamWorks Animation remains located in the city's Grand Central Business Centre on land formerly occupied by a helicopter landing base next to the old airfield (and next to KABC-TV). Following the acquisition of DreamWorks Animation by Comcast and its NBCUniversal subsidiary in 2016, Katzenberg said that "We will absolutely continue to make animated films here."

Smaller television and streaming networks based in Glendale include Fuse and LGBT+ streaming network Revry.

In October 2024, Mayor Elen Asatryan travelled to South Korea, where she struck an entertainment partnership deal with the Incheon Free Economic Zone. The agreement includes a new government-to-government platform jointly built by the governments of Incheon and Glendale and sharing it with entertainment companies in both cities.

== Arts and culture ==
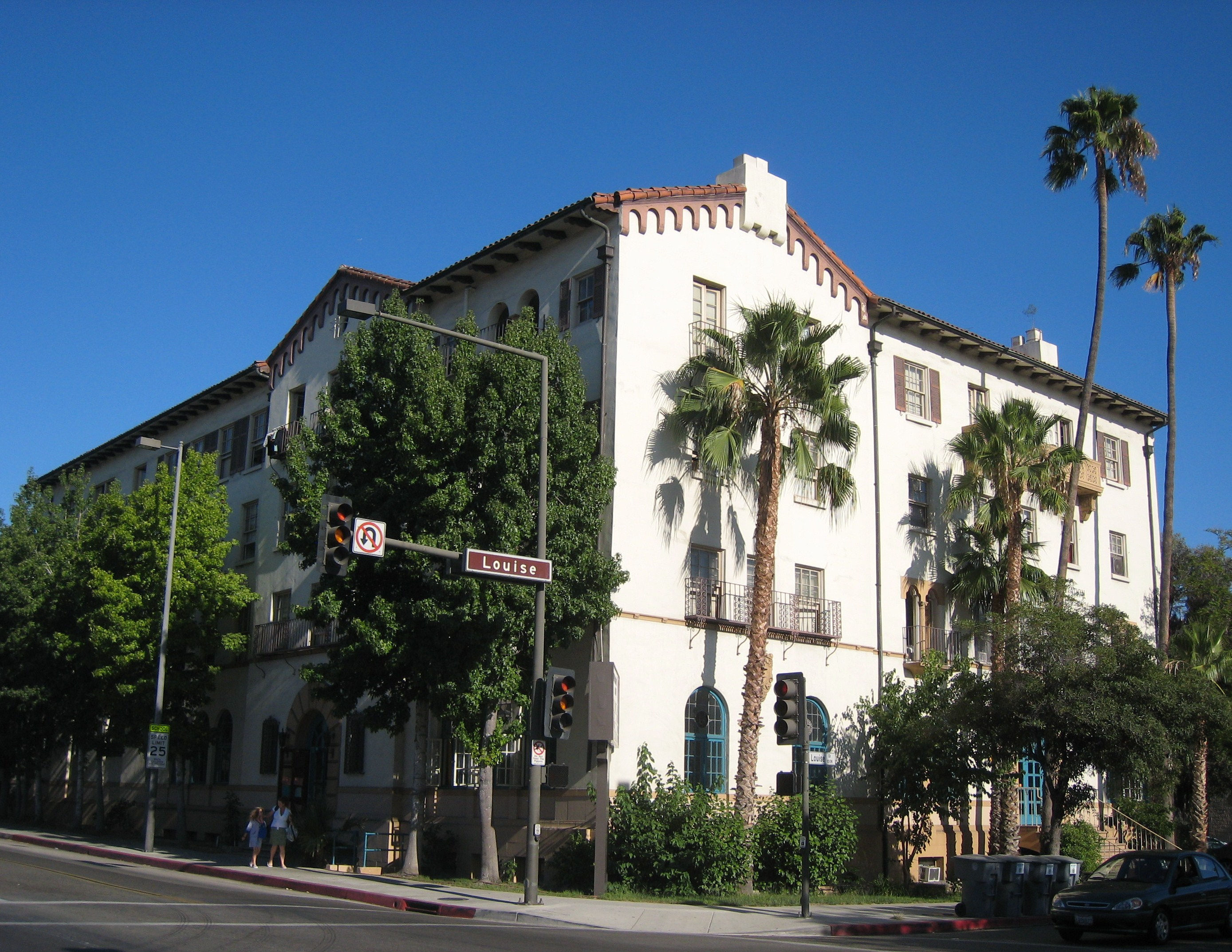
The Spanish Colonial Revival style Glendale YMCA, built in 1924.

=== Cuisine ===
Influenced by the city's immigrant history, Glendale's food culture includes a wide selection of international cuisines, including Filipino cuisine and Armenian cuisine and also Iranian cuisine.

Zhengyalov Hatz, which serves zhingyalov hats, is the Michelin Guide's only Armenian restaurant in the United States.

=== Landmarks ===
Important landmarks in Glendale include the Alex Theatre, Moonlight Rollerway, the Glendale Main Post Office, and the Glendale Transportation Center.

=== Libraries ===
The Glendale Public Library operates eight public libraries in the city.

=== Museums and galleries ===
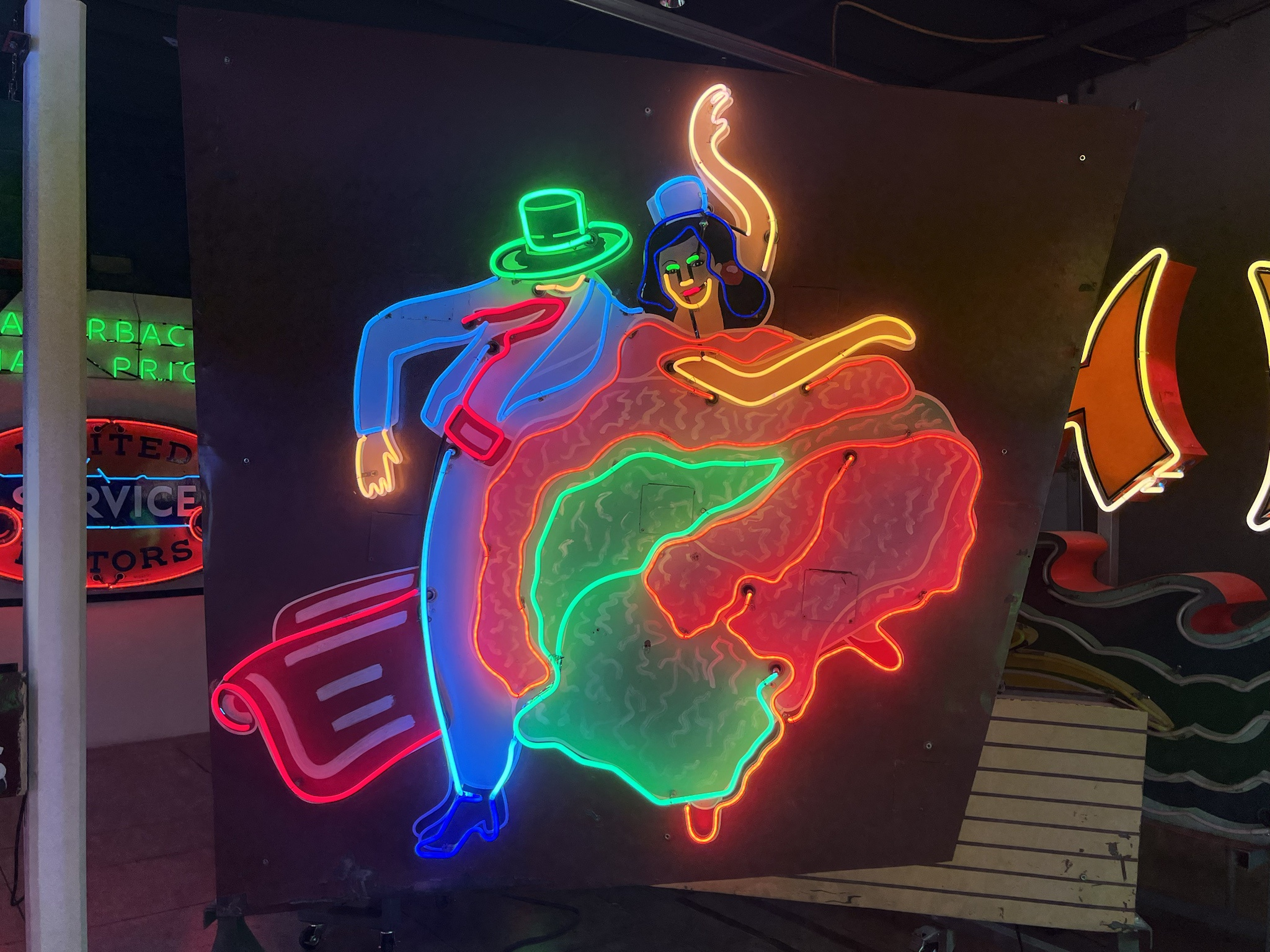
Museum of Neon Art

In 2016, the Museum of Neon Art (MONA), which focuses on historical neon signs, moved to downtown Glendale, with the City committed to funding the museum's new site and construction. The museum has featured exhibitions dedicated to the local community, including Armenians and LGBTQ+ people.

In 2024, the Martial Arts History Museum, which is devoted to the history of martial arts, moved to Glendale. The museum has displays relating to Chinese kung fu, Filipino kali, Hawaiian Kapu Kuialua, Japanese judo and karate, Korean taekwondo, and Thai Muay Thai. At this new, larger location, the museum will also feature Armenian kokh and Mexican lucha libre.

By 2024, the Martial Arts History Museum, the Museum of Neon Art, and the Armenian American Museum were considered to be part of a new "museum row."

=== Performing arts ===
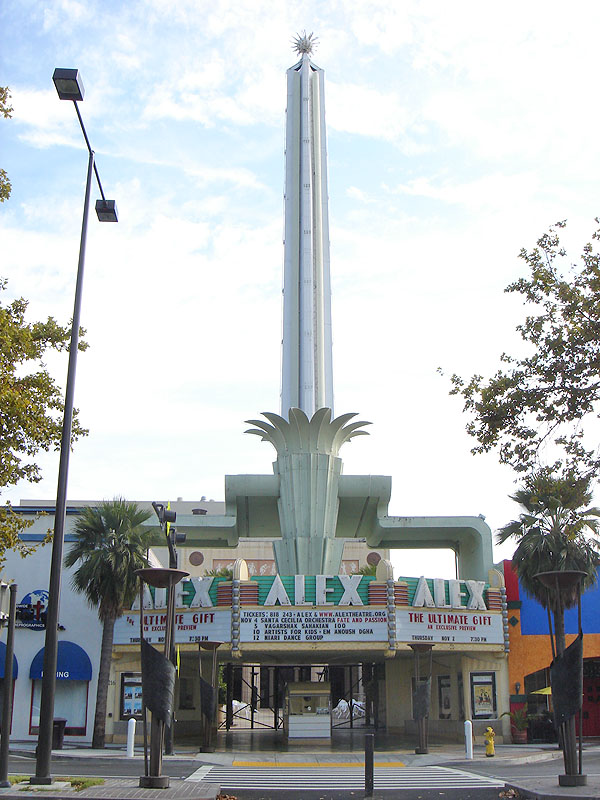
The Alex Theatre

The Alex Theatre is a performing arts center featuring live performances and film screenings.

The City sponsors several concert series: the Brand Summer Music Series, at the Brand Library; the Jewel City Concert Series, at the Artsakh Paseo; and the Summer Concert Series, at Verdugo Park.

=== Public art ===
The City of Glendale's public art includes "Beyond the Box", a utility box art program which includes more than 150 murals, and "Creative Crosswalks", a crosswalk mural program.

In 2016, a 1936 Streamline Moderne filling station in the Adams Hills neighborhood was added to the Glendale Register of Historic Resources and Historic Districts and converted into a public art gallery.

== Parks and recreation ==
The city has nearly 50 public parks, from Deukmejian Wilderness Park in the north to Cerritos Park in the south. Notable parks include Brand Park.

== Government ==
=== Local government ===
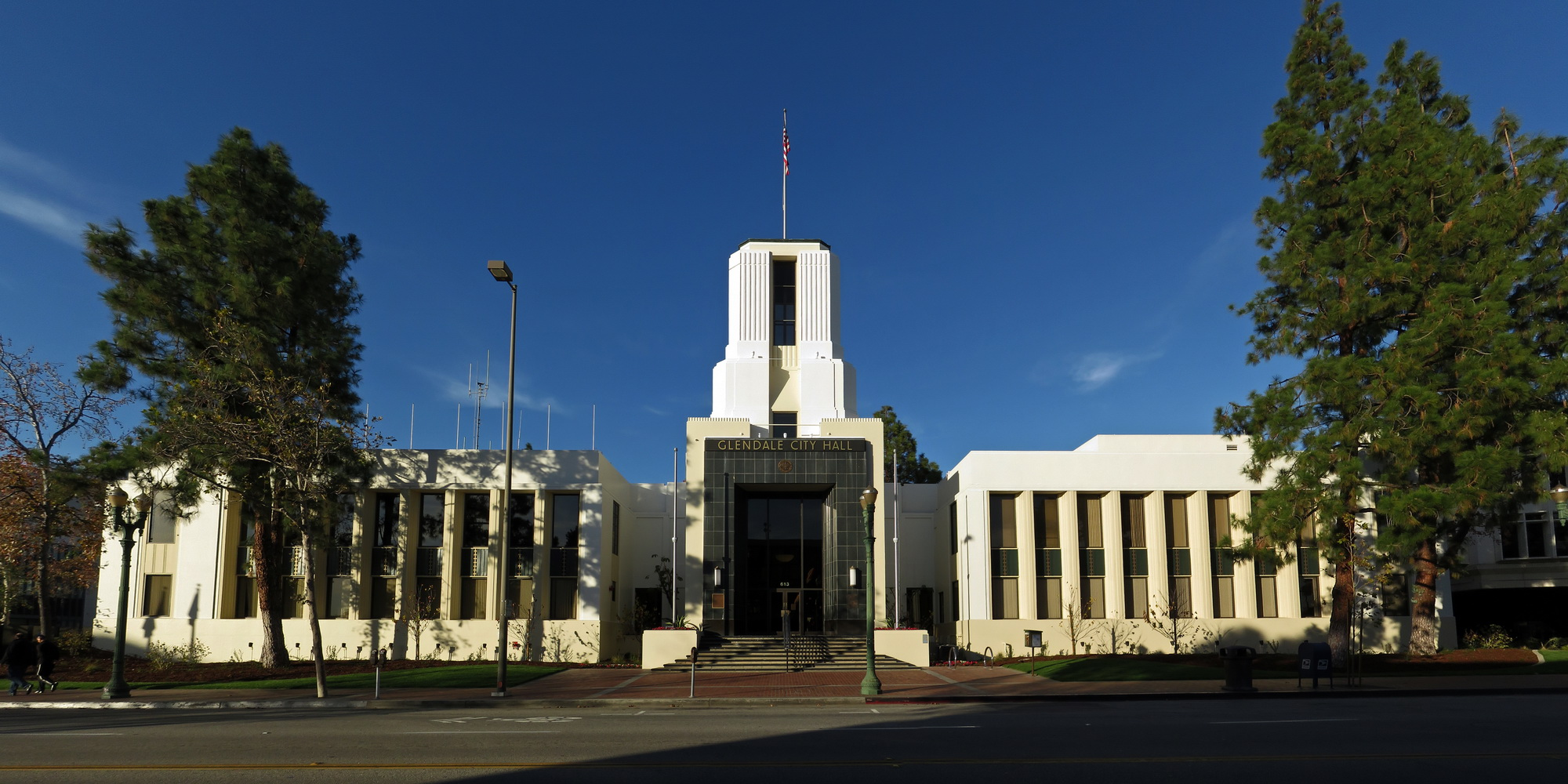
Glendale City Hall

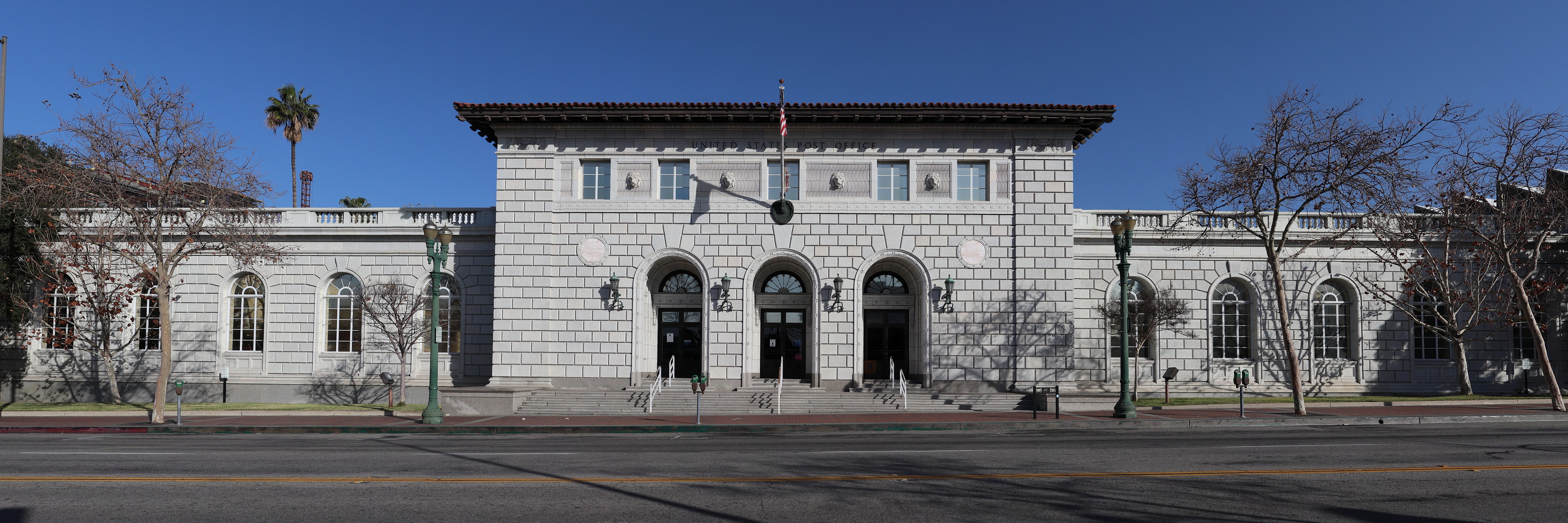
Glendale Main Post Office

According to the city's most recent annual comprehensive financial report, the city's various funds had $576 million in revenues, $543 million in expenditures, $2,090 million in total assets, $481 million in total liabilities, and $460 million in cash and investments. Glendale elects its City Council members at large, to a four-year term. Elections are held on a Tuesday after the first Monday in April of odd-numbered years along with the Glendale Unified School District Board of Education and the Glendale Community College District Board of Trustees.

The mayor is Ardy Kassakhian.

=== County representation ===
The Los Angeles County Department of Health Services operates the Glendale Health Center in Glendale.

The Los Angeles County Department of Public Social Services operates the Glendale DPSS welfare office on San Fernando Road.

The Los Angeles County Department of Parks and Recreation operates Crescenta Valley park in North Glendale

The Los Angeles County Department of Aging and Disabilities operates an undisclosed Adult Protective Services office in Glendale

In the Los Angeles County Board of Supervisors, Glendale is in the Fifth District, represented by Kathryn Barger.

=== State and federal representation ===
In the United States House of Representatives, Glendale is in California's 30th congressional district, represented by Democrat Laura Friedman.

In the California State Legislature, Glendale is in the 25th senatorial district, represented by Democrat Sasha Renée Pérez, and in both the 44th Assembly district, represented by Democrat Nick Schultz, and the 52nd Assembly district, represented by Democrat Jessica Caloza.

== Crime and public safety ==
In 1977 and 1978, 10 murdered women were found in and around Glendale in what became known as the case of the Hillside Strangler. The murders were the work of Kenneth Bianchi and Angelo Buono, the latter of whom resided at 703 East Colorado Street, where most of the murders took place.

In 2014, Glendale was named the ninth-safest city in America in a report published by 24/7 Wall Street based on violent crime rates in cities with more than 100,000 people. Also in 2014, real estate company Movoto used FBI data crime data from 2013 to conduct a study of 100 U.S. cities with populations between 126,047 and 210,309 residents and concluded that Glendale was the safest mid-sized city in America.

== Education ==
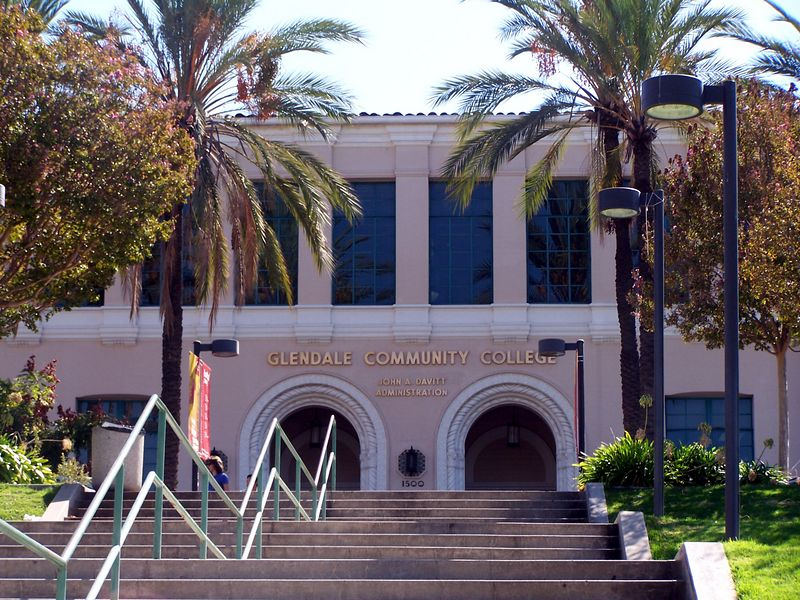
Glendale Community College

The Glendale Unified School District operates the public schools in Glendale. It consists of 20 elementary schools, four middle schools, four high schools and three facilities for homeschoolers and special-needs students.

Glendale USD operates a foreign language (FLAG) program that allows students to study in dual immersion in one of seven languages (Armenian, French, German, Italian, Japanese, Korean, and Spanish) from kindergarten level, with Western Armenian and Filipino/Tagalog being considered for addition. The FLAG program has been recognized for its successes at state level

Glendale Community College has served Glendale since 1927.

== Media ==
=== Print ===
Since 1928, Glendale's English language newspaper of record has been the weekly Glendale News-Press, which has been owned by Outlook Newspapers since 2020. Since 2009, another English language weekly newspaper, the Crescenta Valley Weekly, has also covered Glendale, with a focus on the northern part of Glendale in the Crescenta Valley. Nor Hayastan is the city's Armenian language newspaper. Balita Media publishes two weekly English language newspapers for the Filipino community: Balita Midweek on Wednesdays and Balita Weekend on Saturdays. El Vaquero, established in 1927, is the student newspaper of Glendale Community College.

=== Radio ===
A number of radio stations are broadcast from and/or are licensed to Glendale, including the following:

AM broadcasting

- KRLA "AM 870 The Answer" – (Conservative talk radio)

FM broadcasting

- 95.9 KFSH – (Contemporary Christian music)
- 101.9 KSCA – (Regional Mexican music)

=== Television ===
KABC-TV, an ABC owned-and-operated news broadcasting television station serving Greater Los Angeles, has maintained its César Pelli-designed facility in Glendale since 2000.

Since 2013, USArmenia TV, operated by CS Media has been based in Glendale. The station features Armenian language sitcoms, reality television and news broadcasting. Notable shows include Glendale Life.

== Infrastructure ==
=== Public safety ===
The city operates the Glendale Police Department, which employs 450 personnel including 300 sworn officers and operates helicopter operations in conjunction with Burbank Police Department in the form of a Joint Air Support Unit.

The Glendale Fire Department responds to about 17,000 calls for service annually. The department has nine stations, with mutual aid provided other local departments. The Verdugo Fire Communications Center in Glendale was established in 1979 to consolidate fire dispatching and telecommunications between 13 local fire departments.

The California Highway Patrol's Southern Division is based in Glendale.

=== Transportation ===
==== Bus ====
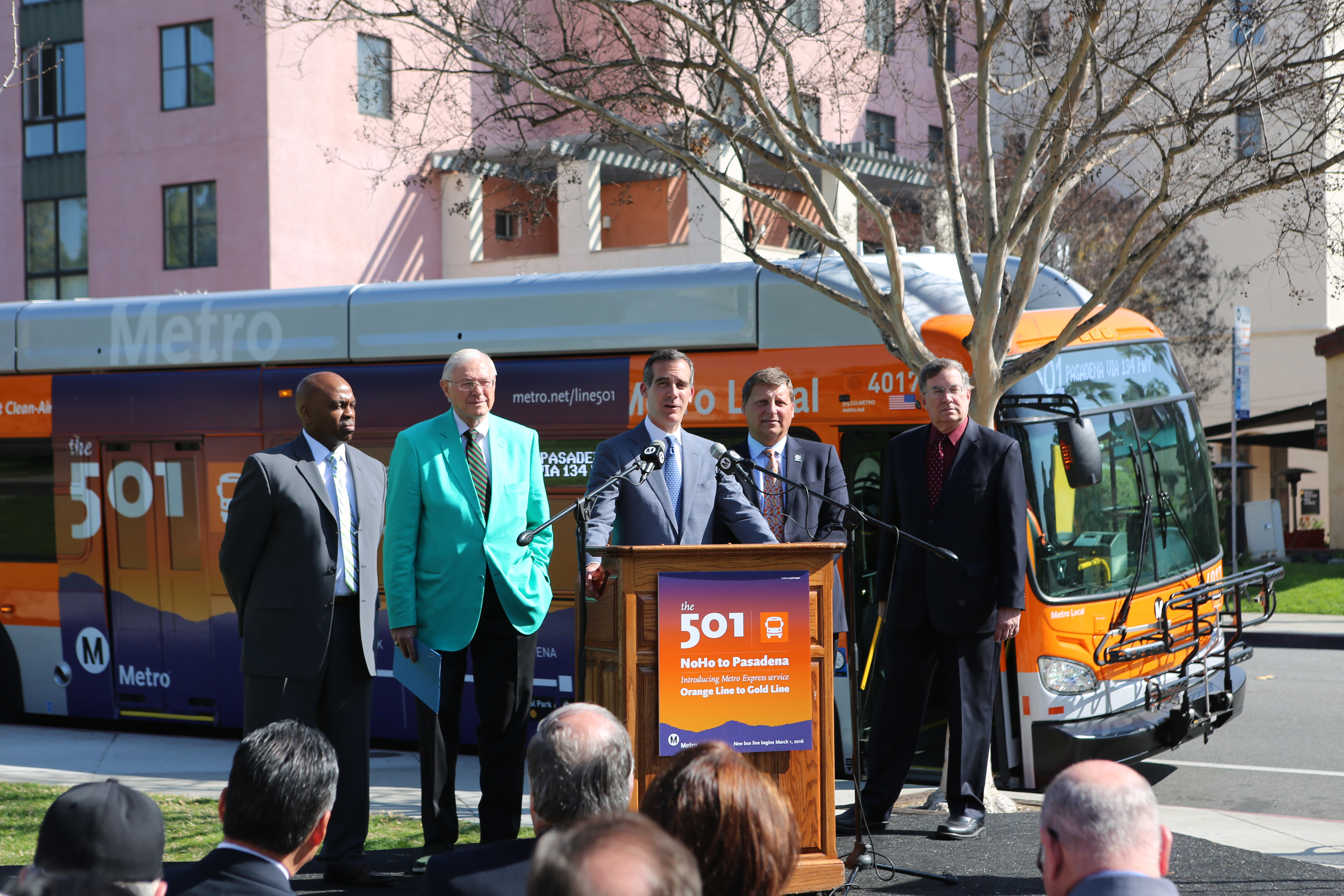
Los Angeles Mayor Eric Garcetti announcing the launch of Metro express route 501 in 2016.

Glendale Beeline is the city's municipal bus and paratransit service, and also serves parts of nearby Burbank, La Cañada Flintridge and La Crescenta-Montrose. The system functions primarily as a community circulator that complements the regional transit services provided by the Los Angeles County Metropolitan Transportation Authority (Metro).

Both Metro and the Los Angeles Department of Transportation serve the city with express busses. Glendale Transportation Center provides connections to Greyhound buses.

The North Hollywood to Pasadena Bus Rapid Transit Project is a proposed 18-mile (29 km) bus rapid transit line. It is planned to operate between Pasadena City College and the North Hollywood station, where it will connect with the Metro B Line and the Metro G Line. The line is expected to open in 2028 as part of Metro's Twenty-eight by '28 initiative.

A 2021 Metro staff report for the Metro Board's Planning and Programming Committee has recommended corridors where the transportation agency could pursue new bus rapid transit lines, including one between downtown Glendale and East Los Angeles College, a 13.64-mile (21.95 km) corridor passing through Los Feliz, Silver Lake, and Echo Park.

==== Microtransit ====
Metro Micro is an on-demand, shared‐ride microtransit service operated by Los Angeles Metro. The service "is intended to provide first-mile, last-mile transportation to rail and bus lines and intra-community travel within LA County communities that have limited access to traditional transit service." Metro Micro's Glendale availability is limited to the "Highland Park/Eagle Rock/Glendale Service Zone," which includes the Northeast Los Angeles communities of Atwater Village, Cypress Park, Eagle Rock, Glassell Park and Highland Park, and nearby Silver Lake.

==== Rail ====
Metrolink's Antelope Valley Line and Ventura County Line stop at the Glendale Transportation Center, and so does Amtrak's Pacific Surfliner.

During the 1990s, the city advocated for Los Angeles Metro Rail service. Since 2016, Metro and Eco-Rapid Transit have studied has been the creation of a light rail line along the Burbank-Glendale-Los Angeles Union Station corridor, potentially allowing trains to leave the existing right-of-way to travel through the commercial core of Glendale.

Using a grant from the Southern California Association of Governments, the City of Glendale is now in the midst of a feasibility study for a streetcar project. The city is considering two alignments for the proposed system, both of which would feature 16 stops running approximately 2.88 miles (4.63 km) between Stocker Street in the north and the Glendale Transportation Center in the south, where it would connect with Metrolink and Amtrak trains.

==== Airports ====
The closest airport that serves Glendale is the Hollywood Burbank Airport. The airport is owned by the Burbank–Glendale–Pasadena Airport Authority, a joint powers agreement between the cities of Burbank, Glendale, and Pasadena.

==== Freeways and highways ====
Glendale is served by four freeways:

SR 2 – Glendale Freeway (State Route 2).
SR 134 – Ventura Freeway (State Route 134).
I-210 – Foothill Freeway (Interstate 210).
I-5 – Golden State Freeway (Interstate 5).

Major surface streets in the city include: Brand Boulevard, Broadway, Canada Boulevard, Central Avenue, Chevy Chase Drive, Colorado Boulevard, Foothill Boulevard, Glendale Avenue, Glenoaks Boulevard, Grandview Avenue, La Crescenta Avenue, Honolulu Avenue, Pennsylvania Avenue, Riverside Drive, Victory Boulevard, Pacific Avenue, Sonora Avenue, Western Avenue, San Fernando Road, Verdugo Road/Boulevard, Mountain Street, and Ocean View Boulevard.

== Notable people ==
List of people from Glendale, California

== Sister cities ==
Glendale's sister cities are:

- (Republic of Artsakh) Martuni, Artsakh
- Gyumri, Armenia
- Kapan, Armenia
- Santiago, Dominican Republic
- Higashiōsaka, Japan
- Rosarito Beach, Mexico
- Tlaquepaque, Mexico
- Boeun, South Korea
- Gimpo, South Korea
- Goseong, South Korea
- Santa Rosa, Laguna, Philippines

== See also ==
- List of cities in California
- Largest cities in Southern California
- M.V. Hartranft, early 20th-century land developer in Glendale
- Casa Adobe De San Rafael California Historic Landmark in Glendale
- List of sundown towns in the United States
