= Sherman and Henrietta Ford House =

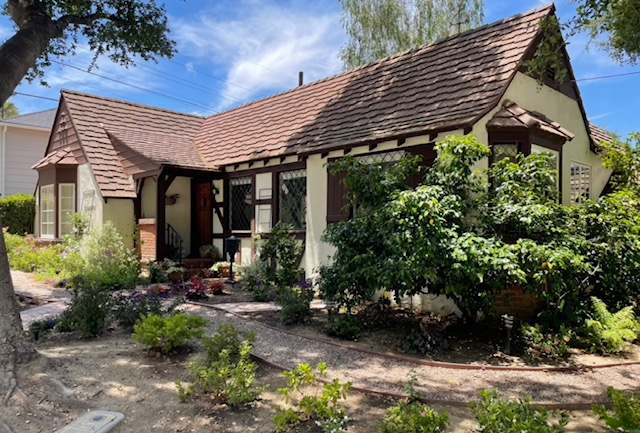
- Sherman and Henrietta Ford House, Glendale, CA - Monument #143
- Interactive map of the Sherman and Henrietta Ford House area

General information
- Architectural style: English Tudor Revival
- Location: 2795 Mira Vista Drive, Glendale, California
- Coordinates: 34.187789°N 118.22399°W
- Year built: 1936

Design and construction
- Architect: John (Jack) Frith

The Sherman and Henrietta Ford House is a house in Glendale, California in the US. It is a rare intact example of a small, storybook-style Tudor cottage, reminiscent of the type of housing built in Southern California in the 1920s and 1930s. It is unique in its scale: affordable and built for a middle-class family, but with all of the care and craftsmanship of the great Tudor Revival estates of Southern California. It was built and designed by John (Jack) Frith in 1936.

== History ==
This Tudor Revival cottage was designed and built in 1936 by contractor Jack Frith for Sherman W. Ford, a retired real estate accountant. Although the title was in Ford's name only, he married Henrietta R. Ford, three decades his junior, at around the time the house was built.

The house is situated on lot 54 of Tract No. 9088 in the Verdugo Woodlands community of Glendale. Verdugo Woodlands has a rich history that reaches back to 1784, when Jose Maria Verdugo received a land grant of 36,403 acres, known as Rancho San Rafael. The rancho includes the present-day cities of Glendale (including the communities of, La Crescenta, Montrose and Verdugo City), Burbank, La Cañada-Flintridge, and the city of Los Angeles communities of Atwater Village, Cypress Park, Eagle Rock, Garvanza, Glassell Park, Highland Park, and Mount Washington.
Tract No. 9088 is a subdivision of a part of Lots 1 and 2 of the Verdugo Estate, a portion of the 2,629 Acre Tract of the Rancho San Rafael allotted to Teodoro and Catalina Verdugo after a court action forced the dividing of the rancho in 1869. The tract was filed on March 17, 1926, and was listed under the ownership of the Hellman Commercial Trust and Savings Bank. On February 1, 1931, Lot 54 was deeded to Matthew Lauder Vallance, a Scottish-born Beverly Hills policeman. On June 12, 1935, he transferred the land to his cousin, Lloyd George Vallance. It was sold to Ford on July 8, 1936, and the permit to build the Tudor Revival house was issued on August 1, 1936.

The Fords appear to have only lived in the house for a short time, if at all. The house was sold a decade later and passed through a series of owners until being purchased by Richard “Dick” L. and Geraldine F. Alexander on September 26, 1974, who resided in the home throughout his illustrious career. Dick Alexander, an American sound engineer, worked on over 170 films and television shows since 1975, being presented with two Academy Awards for sound: All the President’s Men (1976) and Bird (1988). Nominations for his work included The Deep (1977), Tootsie (1982), Ladyhawke (1985), Heartbreak Ridge (1986), Lethal Weapon (1987), and Unforgiven (1992). Alexander frequently held meetings at the house with actors, directors and other production principals such as Clint Eastwood while working on their films. On July 16, 1997, the Alexanders sold the house to the current owner, Steve M. Vilarino. Vilarino has some claim to fame as well, having been a regular on the teen dance show Hollywood A Go Go.

Both the interior and exterior of the house have remained virtually intact from 1936 to the present day.

== Architecture ==
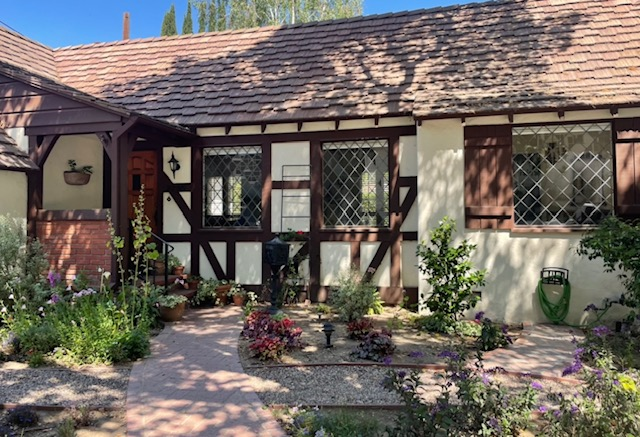
Sherman and Henrietta Ford Home Front

The Tudor Revival style is an amalgamation of Renaissance and Gothic design elements, but is primarily based on Tudor architecture dating from the period spanning 1485 to 1558, when craftsmen built sophisticated two-toned manor homes in villages throughout England. Known for its use of half-timbered walls, steep roof lines and leaded glass windows, the style became easily recognizable and soon had versions appearing in other countries, such as France and the German states. As United States architecture evolved into multiple revival styles, beginning around 1890, the Tudor Revival was one of the earliest to make its appearance. Aspects of the style, especially the half-timbering, found its way into other styles, especially, some Arts and Crafts designs. The use of the Tudor design in the United States hit its zenith during the 1920s and carried on until the onset of World War II.

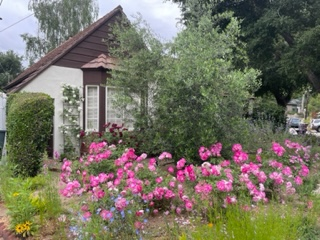
Sherman and Henrietta Ford House Garden

Although Tudor revival homes incurred greater expense to manufacture, they were popular and built in all sizes, including sprawling mansions and small cottages. Most Tudor Revival homes, however, were large manors built in upscale neighborhoods. While the majority of Tudor Revival homes are located in the Northern United States since their facade is ideal for colder climates, the style did become popular in certain parts of Southern California, including such neighborhoods as Hancock Park and Windsor Square in the Wilshire District of Los Angeles. By the 1920s, Los Angeles became a mecca for aspiring craftspeople and artists, lured there by the motion pictures industry. Flush with new wealth, movie moguls and stars sought luxurious living quarters befitting their new status, engendering an abundance of unique architectural revival styles in Los Angeles. Expansive, idealized versions of everything from Mediterranean villas to Spanish Missions and Greek Revival homes emerged. Storybook cottages provided a notable exception to the generous size generally required for revival architecture. Storybook cottages gained popularity in Southern California, though were rarely found anywhere else in the United States. Although the building permit for this house did not require, hence did not list, an architect to be designated, it was most probably designed by the builder, Jack Frith. Frith acted as architect for a similar house in Tujunga, which he built as his own residence.

== Architect and Builder Jack Frith ==
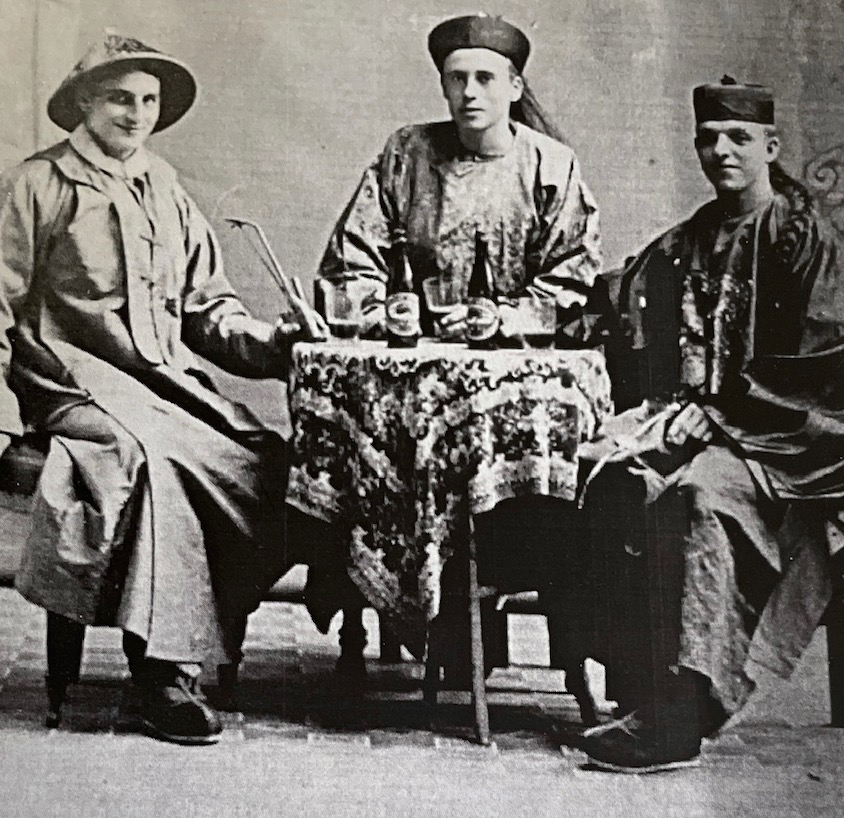
Jack Frith (center) in China, 1909

John Hardy (Jack) Frith was born in 1884, in Settle, Yorkshire, England. At 15, he joined the British Royal Navy, serving for nine years. During that period, he was deployed to China, where he refined carpentry skills originally learned in England. In 1909, following the death of his father, Frith emigrated to the United States, arriving in Philadelphia on June 27, 1910, his mother joining him later that same year. Once established, Frith invited his fiancée, 25-year-old Florence “Floss” Anne Jones, to join him. They were married on December 23, 1911, the day she arrived. The family lived in several cities: Fort Wayne, Indiana; Chicago, Illinois; and Midco, Missouri. During World War I, Frith joined the Royal Canadian Navy. Following his return, the family moved to San Bernardino, California, eventually choosing Tujunga, California, where Frith would build their family home and raise four children. Frith became a United States citizen in 1925.

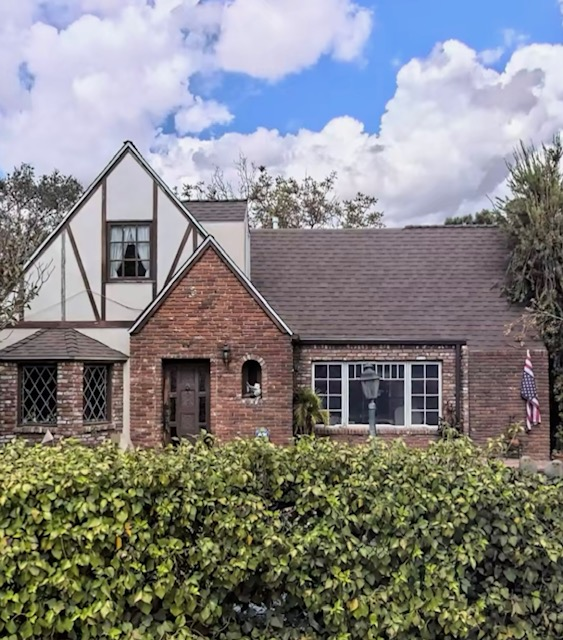
Tudor-style Tujunga home designed and built by Jack Frith for his family

Once settled in Tujunga, Frith began building houses. In 1930, he designed and built his own 1,446 square foot family home at 7705 Beckett Street in Tujunga. In 1936, he designed and built the Sherman and Henrietta Ford House, now designated #143 on the Glendale Register of Historic Resources and Historic Districts. Both homes show Frith's Tudor design elements, particularly his attention to detail and craftsmanship usually reserved for larger estates. Frith continued building houses throughout the Tujunga and San Fernando areas in addition to running larger construction projects in Los Angeles, Alhambra, and San Diego. According to family lore, Frith also performed remodeling work and custom craftsmanship jobs in the homes of Hollywood stars such as Joe E. Brown, Fred Astaire, Humphrey Bogart and Maureen O’Sullivan, building a chapel for the actress and a custom desk for her husband, director John Farrow. During this period, Frith served as commander of Glendale Post No. 4 of the Canadian Legion. He continued working well into the 1950s, even after his wife’s early death on November 24, 1945, at 59. In January 1962, he was installed a second time as the commander of Glendale Post No. 4 of the Canadian Legion, serving until his death after suffering heart attack at work in his shop. Frith died in Los Angeles on November 30, 1962, at 78, and is buried at Forest Lawn Memorial Park in Glendale, California.

== Historic designations ==
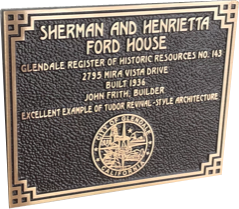
Plaque designating the Sherman and Henrietta Ford House #143 by the Glendale Register of Historic Resources and Historic Districts

The Ford House was designated #143 of the Glendale Register of Historic Resources and Historic Districts on December 20, 2022.

== Earthquake damage and renovation ==
The house suffered damage to its chimney in the 1987 Whittier Narrows earthquake, which was repaired in January 1988. This is the only structural change to have occurred at the residence since its construction.

== See also ==
- Glendale Register of Historic Resources and Historic Districts
