= Glendale Register of Historic Resources and Historic Districts =

Historic register

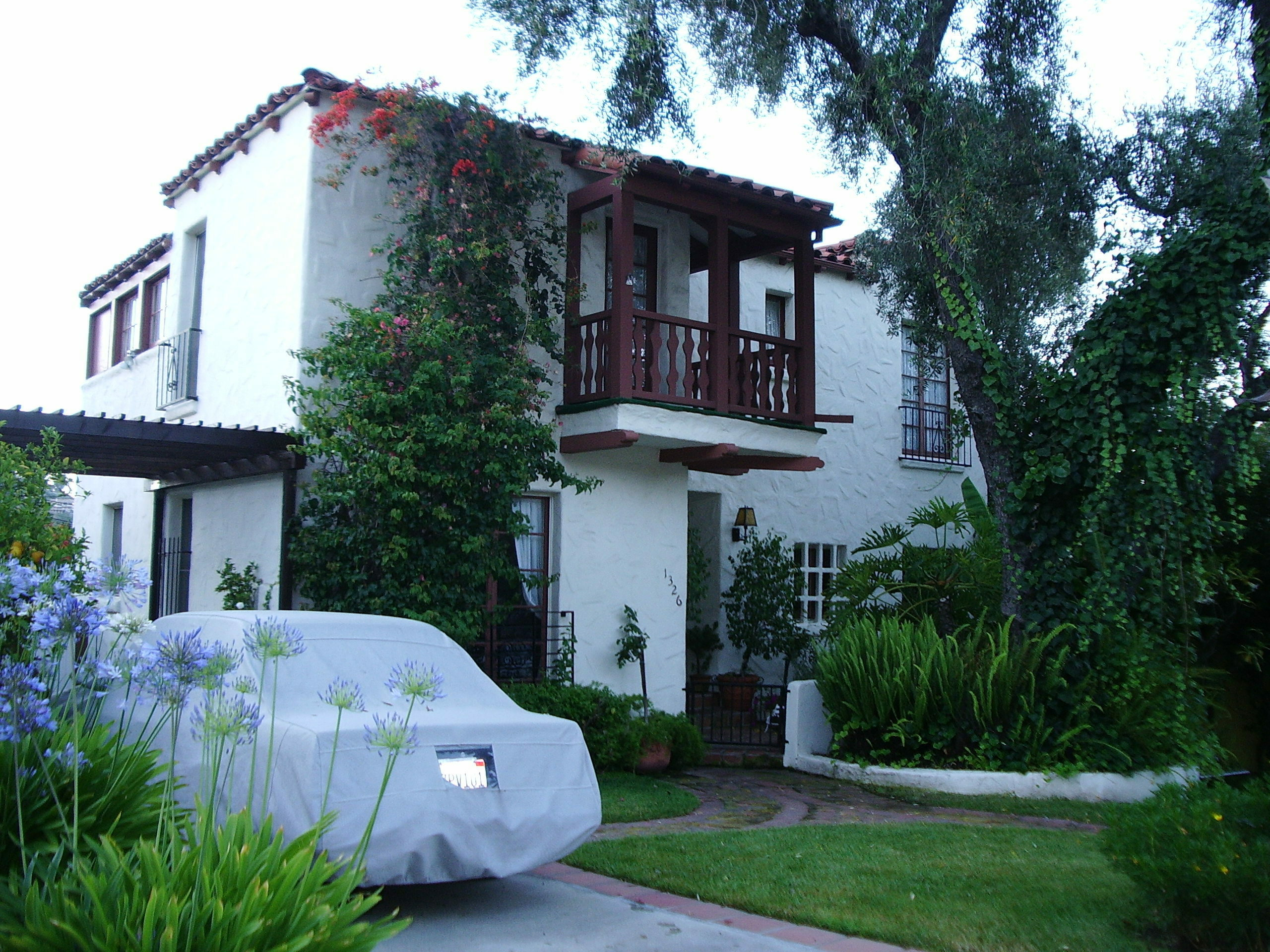
The Peterson Historic House and its restored pergola.

The Glendale Register of Historic Resources and Historic Districts consist of buildings, structures, bridges, statues, trees, and other objects designated by the City of Glendale, California, as significant historic resources or historic districts.

The City of Glendale's historic preservation program began in 1977 with the designation of 28 properties as city landmarks. The Glendale Register of Historic Resources was created in 1997 with the original 28 city landmarks and nine additional properties. The register now includes more than 100 properties.

The City of Glendale has also established five historic districts (Ard Eevin Highlands, Cottage Grove, Royal Boulevard, Brockmont Park, and Rossmoyne) which are also covered by this article. The historic district program began in 2006 with the adoption of guidelines by the Glendale Historic Preservation Commission.

Ten of the properties listed on the Glendale Register are also listed on the National Register of Historic Places (NRHP). These include the Catalina Verdugo Adobe (NRHP 1976), James Daniel Derby House (NRHP 1978), Hotel Glendale (NRHP 1994), Alex Theatre (NRHP 1996), Glendale Southern Pacific Railroad Depot (NRHP 1997), Ard Eevin (NRHP 2006), and Grand Central Air Terminal (NRHP 2017). The Catalina Verdugo Adobe is the only building in Glendale to be designated on the NRHP and the Glendale Register, and also recognized as a California Historical Landmark (designated as CHL No. 637 in 1958).

Although not listed on the Glendale Register, the Rockhaven Sanitarium Historic District is located in Glendale and is listed on the National Register.

A map displaying the locations of Glendale's designated historic resources can be viewed by clicking "OpenStreetMap" in the template found to the right below.

== Glendale Register of Historic Resources ==
#	Name	Image	Location	Designated	Built	Description
1	Catalina Verdugo Adobe		2211 Bonita Dr. 34.180160°N 118.232650°W	1977	1860	The Rancho San Rafael was granted to José María Verdugo in 1784. This adobe was built on a small portion of the rancho by Teodoro Verdugo for José María Verdugo's blind daughter Catalina who lived there until her death in 1871. Also registered as California Historical Landmark No. 637
2	Oak of Peace		2211 Bonita Dr. 34.179977°N 118.232557°W	1977		Large oak tree under which terms of surrender (later formalized in the Treaty of Cahuenga) for the Mexican–American War in Alta California were discussed in 1847 between Californio leader Andrés Pico and his brother Pío Pico (serving as an envoy for John C. Frémont); the tree died from root rot in 1987 but remnants remain
3	Casa Adobe de San Rafael		1330 Dorothy Dr. 34.166090°N 118.263640°W	1977	c. 1865	Adobe hacienda built c. 1865 on the Rancho San Rafael by Tomas Avila Sanchez, the ninth sheriff of Los Angeles County, and his wife Maria Sepulveda; also registered as California Historical Landmark No. 235
4	Taylor House		1027 Glenwood Rd. 34.167020°N 118.277260°W	1977	1873	Redwood farmhouse, the oldest frame house in Glendale
5	W.C.B. Richardson House		1281 Mariposa St. 34.129880°N 118.251420°W	1977	1873	Wood-frame house
6	Doctors House		1692 Brand Park Dr. 34.183670°N 118.277771°W	1977	1887	Queen Ann-East Lake Victorian house moved from 921 E. Wilson Ave. to Brand Park in the 1980s and converted to use as a museum; occupied at different times by two prominent Glendale doctors, Dr. Bogue and Dr. Hurtt
7	El Miradero		1601 W. Mountain St. 34.182362°N 118.276471°W	1977	1903	Also known as Brand Library and Brand Castle, a Moorish mansion built in 1904 by Leslie Coombs Brand and named Miradero (The Overlook); it was later bequeathed to the city and converted to use as a library; expanded in 1965 to accommodate an arts center; located in Brand Park
8	Edgar D. Goode House		119 N. Cedar St. 34.159250°N 118.244700°W	1977	1892	Queen Ann-East Lake Victorian house built for Edgar D. Goode, a leader in Glendale's incorporation drive; threatened with demolition in 1990 and later used as a recreation center
9	Toll House		1521 N. Columbus Ave. 34.170160°N 118.264870°W	1977	1912	Craftsman house designed by Glendale architect Charles Shattuck and built in 1912 for Charles H. and Eleanor Joy Toll; originally situated on a seven-acre lot that was subdivided; "remarkably intact inside and out"
10	Glendale Southern Pacific Railroad Depot		400 W. Cerritos Ave. 34.123660°N 118.258950°W	1977	1923	Railroad depot built by the Southern Pacific Railroad in the Mission Revival and Spanish Colonial Revival architectural styles in 1923; listed on the NRHP in 1997
11	Le Mesnager Barn		3429 Markridge Rd. 34.249369°N 118.253313°W	1977	1911	Stone barn that served as a winery in its early years, later destroyed by fire and rebuilt as a family home; now located in the Deukmejian Wilderness Park and maintained by the Stone Barn Vineyard Conservancy
12	Statue of Miss American Green Cross		Brand Park; 34.182845°N 118.276804°W	1977	1928	Bronze cast statue of "Miss American Green Cross" created by William Potter and dedicated in 1928; the American Green Cross was an organization dedicated to preserving the country's forests
13	G.A.R. Meeting Hall		902 S. Glendale Ave. 34.135670°N 118.251170°W	1977	c. 1900	One-story bungalow that served as the headquarters of the Grand Army of the Republic; housed displaced victims of the 1906 San Francisco earthquake; later became a local chapter of the Disabled American Veterans
14	Glendale Young Men's Christian Association		140 N. Louise St. 34.147340°N 118.252220°W	1977	1926	Four-story Spanish Colonial Revival YMCA building constructed in 1926 with reinforced concrete brick and stucco; added to the NRHP in 1994
15	Masonic Temple		234 S. Brand Blvd. 34.144400°N 118.254940°W	1977	1928	Commercial Art Deco
16	Security Trust and Savings Bank		100 N. Brand Blvd. 34.146510°N 118.254730°W	1977	1923	Six-story Classical bank building built in 1923
17	Hotel Glendale		701 E. Broadway; 34.146560°N 118.246750°W	1977	1924	Six-story Beaux Arts Classical hotel opened in 1925 and later converted to senior citizen housing
18	Harrower Lab		920 E. Broadway; 34.146010°N 118.243400°W	1977	1920	Commercial vernacular building originally the laboratory of Henry Harrower, a controversial early figure in endocrinology; later the site of the Los Angeles Chiropractic College from 1949 until the early 1980s and thereafter offices for Integrated Systems Group
19	Grand Central Air Terminal		1310 Air Way; 34.162970°N 118.286680°W	1977	1928	Air terminal built in 1928 in Spanish Colonial Revival & Zig-Zag Moderne design; famous aviators used the facility including Charles Lindbergh, Amelia Earhart, Howard Hughes, Jack Northrop, and Wiley Post
20	Alex Theatre		216 N. Brand Blvd. 34.148790°N 118.254570°W	1977	1925	Theater built in 1925 with front exterior facade added in 1939; in Classical Revival, Egyptian Revival styles; 100-foot-tall art-deco column with neon lights, topped by a spiked, neon sphere was added in 1940 and designed by S. Charles Lee
21	Jones House		727 W. Kenneth Rd. 34.171570°N 118.271190°W	1977	1922	Colonial Revival house built in 1922 by Mattison Boyd Jones and used in many motion pictures including "Gone with the Wind"
22	James Daniel Derby House		2535 E. Chevy Chase Dr. 34.161621°N 118.211418°W	1977	1926	built in 1926 for James Daniel Derby; designed in the American Modernistic architectural style with Mayan features by Lloyd Wright; built with pre-cast and knitted concrete blocks
23	Calori House		3021 E. Chevy Chase Dr. 34.168610°N 118.205010°W	1977	1926	Spanish Colonial Revival house designed by Lloyd Wright; includes a "cave-like" entrance topped by a balcony
24	Rodriguez House		1845 Niodrara Dr. 34.176060°N 118.230550°W	1977	1941	Modern house built in 1941 and designed by Rudolph Schindler
25	Homeland		1405 E. Mountain St. 34.166680°N 118.236580°W	1977	1926	Mediterranean house in the style of an Italian villa built for William F. Markham, inventor of the Markham Air Rifle (air gun)
26	Brockman Clock Tower		1605 Arbor Dr. 34.171710°N 118.262570°W	1977	c. 1914	Spanish Colonial Revival clock tower
27	Lorelei		330 Kempton Rd. 34.172240°N 118.262040°W	1977	1929	Mediterranean house built in 1929 for Peter Damm, reportedly the inventor of the armored car
28	Walters House, aka Barnum House		3000 Sparr Blvd. 34.191310°N 118.226250°W	1977	1923	Spanish Colonial Revival house
29	Blumenthal House		2414 E. Glenoaks Blvd. 34.149690°N 118.212400°W	1997	1931	Zig-zag Moderne house
30	Municipal Power and Light Building		620 E. Wilson Ave. 34.147649°N 118.267645°W	1997	1928	Two-story concrete Art Deco building designed by architect Frederick Roehrig; facade includes ornamentation in shape of leaves, feathers, garlands and urns, and Art Deco spirals; also known as the Howard Street Substation; Formerly 145 N. Howard St.
31	Glendale City Hall		613 E. Broadway; 34.147230°N 118.247940°W	1997	1940-41	Art Deco
32	US Post Office-Glendale Main		313 E. Broadway; 34.146660°N 118.251990°W	1997	1934	Italian Renaissance post office building
33	Gregorians Residence		1527 Cedarhill Rd. 34.169970°N 118.260200°W	1997	1912	California Bungalow
34	Geneva Street Bridge		Geneva Blvd. @ Verdugo Flood Control; 34.157780°N 118.246818°W	1997	1937	Bridge Vierendeel Truss
35	Kenilworth Avenue Bridge		Kenilworth Ave. @ Verdugo Flood Control; 34.158475°N 118.266900°W	1997	1937	Bridge Vierendeel Truss
36	Glenoaks Boulevard Bridge		Glenoaks Blvd. @ Verdugo Flood Control; 34.159998°N 118.240910°W	1997	1937	Bridge Vierendeel Truss
37	Concord Street Bridge		Concord St. @ Verdugo Flood Control; 34.156850°N 118.271160°W	1997	1936	Bridge Through Truss
38	F.W. Woolworth Building		201 N. Brand Blvd. 34.148600°N 118.255470°W	1998	1942	Streamline Moderne commercial building
39	Edmonstone		1134 E. Lexington Dr. 34.151410°N 118.240200°W	2002	1928	Spanish and Mission Revival apartment building
40	Elliott House		1330 N. Louise St. 34.166520°N 118.252410°W	2002	1915	Craftsman house
41	Vercellini House		604 Alta Vista Dr. 34.128910°N 118.247050°W	2002	1927	Spanish Revival house
42	Crowell-Saylor House		2766 E. Glenoaks Blvd. 34.152407°N 118.203582°W	2002	1928	French Revival house
43	Wian House		1410 Royal Blvd. 34.167080°N 118.233678°W	2002	1928	Spanish Revival house owned by Bob Wian, founder of Bob's Big Boy; part of the Royal Boulevard Historic District
44	Glen Arden Apartments		347 Arden Ave. 34.158860°N 118.260078°W	2002	1929	Spanish Revival apartment building
45	Ard Eevin		851 W. Mountain St. 34.177250°N 118.272240°W	2002	1903	Colonial Revival, Bungalow/craftsman, Eclectic house designed by architect Nathaniel Dryden; added to NRHP in 2006
46	Shoseian Teahouse		Brand Park; 34.182906°N 118.278070°W	2003	1974	Japanese teahouse, aka Shoseian Whispering Pine Japanese Tea House
47	Anderson House		1327 Cordova Ave. 34.166006°N 118.242357°W	2003	1929	Spanish Revival house
48	Cannon House		1206 E. Mountain St. 34.163489°N 118.238062°W	2004	1928	Spanish Revival house
49	Louise-Dryden Apartments		1105 N. Louise St. 34.161668°N 118.253041°W	2004	1924	Egyptian Revival/Art Nouveau apartment building
50	Peterson House		1326 Cordova Ave. 34.165747°N 118.241949°W	2004	1928	Spanish Revival house
51	Hewitt-Baker House		319 E. Randolph St. 34.165522°N 118.251850°W	2004	1914	Craftsman house
52	Baird House		1616 Parkridge Dr. 34.171578°N 118.260104°W	2004	1926	Spanish Revival house
53	1114 Rossmoyne Avenue		1114 Rossmoyne Ave. 34.161703°N 118.241555°W	2005	1923	English Tudor Revival house
54	Worley House		1560 Grandview Ave. 34.174589°N 118.277968°W	2005	1923	English Tudor Revival house
55	Cline House		511 W. Kenneth Rd. 34.169995°N 118.266658°W	2005	1924	Mediterranean Revival house
56	Sahakian House		943 E. Mountain St. 34.164426°N 118.240329°W	2005	1936	Colonial Revival house
57	Lynch House		1230 Rossmoyne Ave. 34.163282°N 118.241043°W	2005	1924	Spanish Colonial Revival house
58	Ford House		1745 Melwood Dr. 34.170044°N 118.246233°W	2005	1939	Monterey Colonial Revival house
59	Ben Lomond House		1518 Ben Lomond Dr. 34.172277°N 118.274067°W	2006	1925	French Eclectic house
60	Jacob D. Funk House		1480 Melwood Dr. 34.168027°N 118.248368°W	2006	1928	Spanish Colonial Revival house
61	Lombardi House		850 Cumberland Rd. 34.175777°N 118.273038°W	2006	1929	Spanish Colonial Revival house
62	Bonetto House		2819 Manhattan Ave. 34.215277°N 118.240604°W	2006	1931	English Tudor Revival house occupied by Florence and Tom Bonetto
63	Daily House		3637 El Lado Dr. 34.213678°N 118.247358°W	2007	1954	Single-story, stone-and-glass Modernist house in the Glendale hills and designed by Clair Earl
64	Wheeler House		922 Cumberland Rd. 34.175712°N 118.275798°W	2007	1932	Spanish Colonial Revival house
65	Seeley's Building		1800 S. Brand Blvd. 34.1234485°N 118.2548191°W	2008	1925/46	Streamline Moderne commercial building
66	Brougher House		321 Lawson Place; 34.170395°N 118.262014°W	2007	1928	Spanish Colonial Revival house and orchard
67	1661 Valley View Road		1661 Valley View Rd. 34.172591°N 118.259158°W	2007	1936	Spanish Colonial Revival house
68	Lewis House		1415 Royal Blvd. 34.167001°N 118.234434°W	2008	1927	Spanish Colonial Revival house owned by Ed "Strangler" Lewis, world heavyweight wrestling champion of the 1920s; part of the Royal Boulevard Historic District
69	2964 Edmonton Road		2964 Edmonton Rd. 34.167786°N 118.206319°W	2008	1927	Spanish Colonial Revival house
70	Wellman House		1428 Imperial Dr. 34.167200°N 118.235729°W	2008	1930	Spanish Colonial Revival house
71	721 E. Mountain Street		721 E. Mountain St. 34.165414°N 118.245933°W	2008	1926	French Eclectic house
72	Cedar Knoll		418 W. Kenneth Rd. 34.169195°N 118.264713°W	2009	1922	Colonial Revival house
73	955 Rosemount Road		955 Rosemount Rd. 34.166245°N 118.239674°W	2009	1934	Spanish Colonial Revival house
74	1117 Rossmoyne Avenue		1117 Rossmoyne Ave. 34.161837°N 118.242155°W	2009	1929	Spanish Colonial Revival house
75	McCall's House		1455 Royal Blvd. 34.168021°N 118.235298°W	2009	1936	French Revival house
76	1535 N. Pacific Avenue		1535 N. Pacific Ave. 34.170922°N 118.266159°W	2009	1923	Eclectic house
77	1675 Ard Eevin Avenue		1675 Ard Eevin Ave. 34.175804°N 118.272494°W	2009	1924	Tudor Revival house
78	1344 Rossmoyne Avenue		1344 Rossmoyne Ave. 34.165461°N 118.238042°W	2009	1931	Tudor Revival house
79	Bloch House		1758 Rohr St. 34.176094°N 118.266752°W	2009	1973	Modern house
80	1020 Hillcroft Road		1020 Hillcroft Rd. 34.166962°N 118.239186°W	2009	1931	Tudor Revival house designed by architect Radcliffe Hollingsworth
81	1220 Cortez Drive		1220 Cortez Dr. 34.163005°N 118.240246°W	2009	1928	Spanish Colonial Revival house
82	1640 Ard Eevin Avenue		1640 Ard Eevin Ave. 34.174574°N 118.272141°W	2010	1924	Tudor Revival house
83	Prock House		1339 Romulus Drive	2010	1961	Modern house built in 1961 by architect Richard Fleming in the Adam's Hill neighborhood
84	1441 Royal Boulevard		1441 Royal Boulevard	2010	1931	Spanish Colonial Revival house
85	Rice House		2096 Rimcrest Dr. 34.176006°N 118.253675°W	2010	1993	Modern house
86	1446 Royal Boulevard		1446 Royal Boulevard	2010	1936	Colonial Revival house
87	Casa de Carmen		1770 Grandview Avenue	2010	1925	Spanish Colonial Revival house
88	2990 Edgewick Drive		2990 Edgewick Drive	2011	1963	Modern house
89	403 S. Central Avenue		403 S. Central Ave. 34.141538°N 118.258267°W	2011	1923/29	Art Deco (utilitarian) commercial building
90	Gray-Sherwood House		1345 Cordova Avenue	2011	1928	Spanish Colonial Revival house
91	Stanford House	The Stanford House in Glendale, California	804 W. Kenneth Road	2011	1928	Spanish Colonial Revival house
92	Wall House		1374 Greenmont Drive	2011	1959	Ranch residence with modern/Asian influence
93	Farrar House		2440 St. Andrews Drive	2011	1925	Spanish Colonial Revival house
94	Steen House (Ise Homestead)		1646 Golf Club Dr. 34.172114°N 118.206858°W	2012	1979	Modern house
95	Duntley House		1407 Imperial Drive	2012	1932	Tudor Revival house
96	Kolonialvue		221 W. Kenneth Road	2012	1932	Colonial Revival house
97	Farmer House		1753 Hillcrest Avenue	2013	1925	Spanish Colonial Revival house
98	Burkhard House		1471 Royal Boulevard	2013	1949	Modern house
99	Thompson-Howe House		1050 Hillcroft Road	2013	1928	Spanish Colonial Revival house
100	Municipal Services Building		633 E. Broadway; 34.146430°N 118.248280°W	2013	1966	Modern government building
101	Webb House		611 Cumberland Road	2013	1950	Tudor Revival house
102	Clapp House		1440 N. Maryland Avenue	2013	1925	Mediterranean Revival house
103	Brockmont		1605 Arbor Dr. 34.171703°N 118.262395°W	2013	1910	Craftsman/Prairie house
104	630 W. Kenneth Road	630 W. Kenneth Road	630 W. Kenneth Rd. 34.169895°N 118.269200°W	2013	c. 1890	Colonial Revival house
105	Weaver House		1411 N. Central Avenue	2014	1927	Spanish Colonial Revival house
106	Hovaguimian House		2430 Bywood Drive	2014	1954	Modern house
107	Wallace House		141 S. Cedar St. 34.145517°N 118.244332°W	2014	1913	Craftsman house
108	Samuel and Beth Peterson House		1106 Rossmoyne Avenue	2014	1935	Spanish Colonial Revival house
109	Lawson-Stengel House		1663 Grandview Avenue	2014	1925	Mediterranean Revival house
110	Harris House	The Harris House in Glendale, California	822 E. Wilson Ave. 34.147899°N 118.244559°W	2014	1902	Victorian/Craftsman house
111	Adams Square Gas Station		1020 E. Palmer Ave. 34.132408°N 118.242066°W	2015	1936	Former gas station Streamline Moderne
112	Peterka House		1330 Romulus Dr. 34.134806°N 118.236493°W	2015	1963	Modern house
113	Willard House		2312 Blanchard Drive	2015	1929	Tudor Revival house
114	Barker House		1440 Melwood Drive	2016	1958	Modern
115	Irving Air Chute Company Building		1500 Flower Street	2016	1929	Art Deco
116	Benetti House		3620 Angelus Avenue	2016	1931	Vernacular/Stone
117	Beggs House		408 Ross Street	2017	1915	Craftsman
118	Freeman House		1524 Majestic Way	2017	1937	Monterey Revival
119	Casa Verdugo		1235 N. Louise Street	2017	1907	Mission Revival
120	Whitney House		1242 Bruce Avenue	2017	1939	French Eclectic
121	Miradero Gateway		Brand Park	2018	1913	Saracenic
122	Brand Cemetery		Brand Park	2018	1925	Egyptian Revival
123	Kiefer & Eyerick Mortuary		314 E. Harvard Street	2018	1928	Tudor Revival
124	Shaeffer House		527 Whiting Woods Road	2018	1949	Modern
125	Joy House		1539 El Rito Avenue	2018	1932	Monterey Revival
126	Grether House		1545 Virginia Avenue	2019	1930	Tudor Revival
127	Knudsen House		3030 Edgewick Road	2019	1929	Tudor Revival
128	Howland House		1837 Sherer Lane	2019	1926	Mediterranean Revival
129	Austin House		1427 Andenes Drive	2019	1937	Swiss Chalet
130	Jack and JoAnn Taylor House		1390 Greenmont Drive	2019	1959	Modern
131	Wright House		1116 Don Jose Drive	2019	1933	Colonial Revival
132	Cole-Carothers House		1235 Glenwood Road	2019	1910	Craftsman
133	Whittick House		1818 Pasa Glen Drive	2019	1941	eclectic
134	Newton House		305 E. Randolph Street	2020	1906	Neo-Classical
135	Nibley Park		1103 E. Mountain Street	2021	1925	n/a
136	Webber House		268 W. Kenneth Road	2021	1950	Modern
137	Tatum House		1300 N. Maryland Avenue	2021	c.1908	Craftsman
138	Berg House		1575 Sheridan Road	2021	1957	Modern
139	1559 Grandview Avenue		1559 Grandview Avenue	2022	1926	Spanish Colonial Revival
140	Robert and Florence Dick House		1639 Santa Barbara Avenue	2022	1926	Spanish Colonial Revival
141	Echols House		711 E. Mountain Street	2022	1923	Spanish Colonial Revival
142	Vida H. Wallace House		849 Cavanagh Road	2022	1928	Spanish Colonial Revival
143	Sherman and Henrietta Ford House		2795 Mira Vista Drive; 34.187789°N 118.22399°W	2022	1936	English Tudor Revival cottage built by John Frith, owned by Academy Award winning Warner Brothers sound engineer Dick Alexander from 1974 to 1997.
144	Mahoney House		1012 Crestview	2023	1932	Spanish Colonial Revival
145	Glendale Central Library		222 E. Harvard Street	2023	1973	Brutalist
146	Asa and Ann Fanset House		1006 E. Harvard Street	2023	1906	Craftsman
147	W.R. Burnett House		926 Hillcroft Road	2023	1929	Spanish Colonial Revival
148	Wyman House		1326 N. Maryland Avenue	2023	1913	Craftsman

== Glendale Historic Districts ==
Name	Image	Boundaries	Description
Royal Boulevard		Royal Blvd. between Princess Dr. and Del Monte Dr.	Glendale's first historic district; consists of 30 houses, including examples of Spanish Colonial Revival, Tudor Revival, and French-inspired architecture; mostly built from 1927 to 1948 by the Haddock-Nibley Company
Ard Eevin Highlands		W. Mountain on north, Ard Eevin on west, Glenview on south, and Highland on east	Consists of 87 homes in the Cumberland Heights neighborhood, mostly built between the 1920s and 1940s; the neighborhood was initially developed and subdivided by brothers Dan and Arthur Campbell; includes Spanish Colonial, Monterey, Colonial, and Tudor Revival homes
Cottage Grove		Cottage Grove Ave. between E. Palmer Ave. and Green St.	Consists of 14 homes at the foot of Adams Hill; primarily Tudor Revival cottages providing feel of an "English village"; also includes the 1901 farmhouse that was the first structure in the neighborhood prior to its subdivision
Brockmont Park		Cumberland Rd. and Arbor Dr. on the north, Parkridge Dr. and Valley View Rd. on the east, Kenneth Rd. on the south, and Merriman Dr. on the west	Consists of 58 houses built on the estate of John C. Brockman; Brockmont's hillside home (Brockmont) and the four-story clock tower he built in 1914 are major assets in the district; the estate was subdivided after Brockman's death and became known as Brockmont Park
Rossmoyne		Glenoaks Blvd. on the south, Cordova Ave. and Carmen Dr. on the west, Del Rey Dr. and Hillcroft Rd. and E. Mountain St. on the north, and Ethel St. on the east	Glendale's largest historic district with 503 houses in Spanish Colonial Revival, Tudor Revival, and French designs; mostly built between 1923 and 1950

== See also ==
- National Register of Historic Places listings in Los Angeles County, California
- California Historical Landmarks in Los Angeles County, California
