= Rancho La Cañada =

Mexican land grant California

Coordinates: 34.200°N 118.210°W

Rancho La Cañada was a 5,832-acre (23.60 km^{2}) Mexican land grant in the San Rafael Hills and Crescenta Valley, of present-day Los Angeles County, California, given in 1843 by Governor Manuel Micheltorena to a Mexican schoolteacher from Los Angeles, Ygnacio Coronel.

The name means "ranch of the canyon". The rancho included the current day city of La Cañada Flintridge and community of La Crescenta-Montrose.

== History ==
In 1843, Ygnacio Coronel was granted a property he called La Cañada Atras de Rancho Los Verdugos ("canyon behind the Verdugo ranch"). Julio Verdugo disputed the grant claiming it was part of his Rancho San Rafael. Ygnacio Coronel built a small house near where is now Glendale College, and farmed there until outlaws threatened his family. During the Mexican–American War (1847), Coronel abandoned the rancho, and in 1852 sold Rancho La Cañada to the law partners Jonathan R. Scott and Benjamin Hayes. Scott had come to Southern California from Missouri in 1849, and became the first American justice of the peace in Los Angeles. He administered the oath of office to the first Los Angeles City Council on July 3, 1850. Scott bought out Hayes portion of Rancho La Cañada.

With the cession of California to the United States following the Mexican–American War, the 1848 Treaty of Guadalupe Hidalgo provided that the land grants would be honored. As required by the Land Act of 1851, a claim for Rancho La Cañada was filed with the Public Land Commission in 1852, and the grant was patented to Scott in 1866.

In 1857, Scott traded Rancho La Cañada to Julio and Catalina Verdugo, heirs of Jose Maria Verdugo, for 4,607 acres (19 km^{2}) on the west side of Rancho San Rafael – what is today Burbank. In 1875 Rancho La Cañada was sold to two healthseekers from Michigan, Jacob Lanterman, a dentist, and Colonel Adolphus Williams, a Civil War veteran.

== See also ==
- Ranchos of California
- List of Ranchos of California
- List of rancho land grants in Los Angeles County, California
