= Casa Adobe de San Rafael =

Historic home in Glendale, California, US

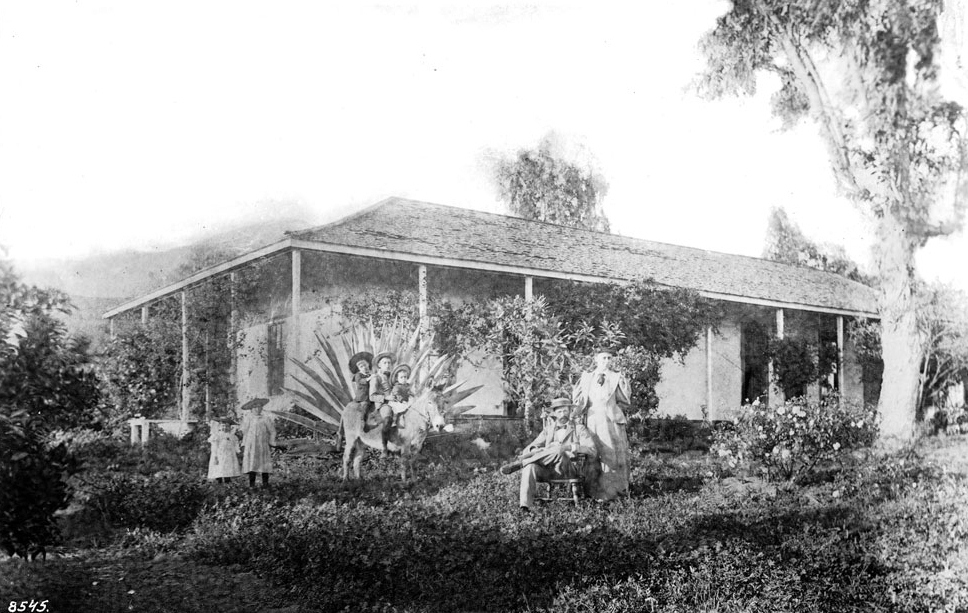
- Casa Adobe De San Rafael in 1895

- Location within the Los Angeles metropolitan area
- 34°9′56″N 118°15′50″W
- Location: 1330 Dorothy Dr, Glendale, California CA 91202

History
- Built: 1865

Site notes
- Area: 1.6 acres (0.65 ha)

California Historical Landmark
- Designated: October 31, 1935
- Reference no.: 235

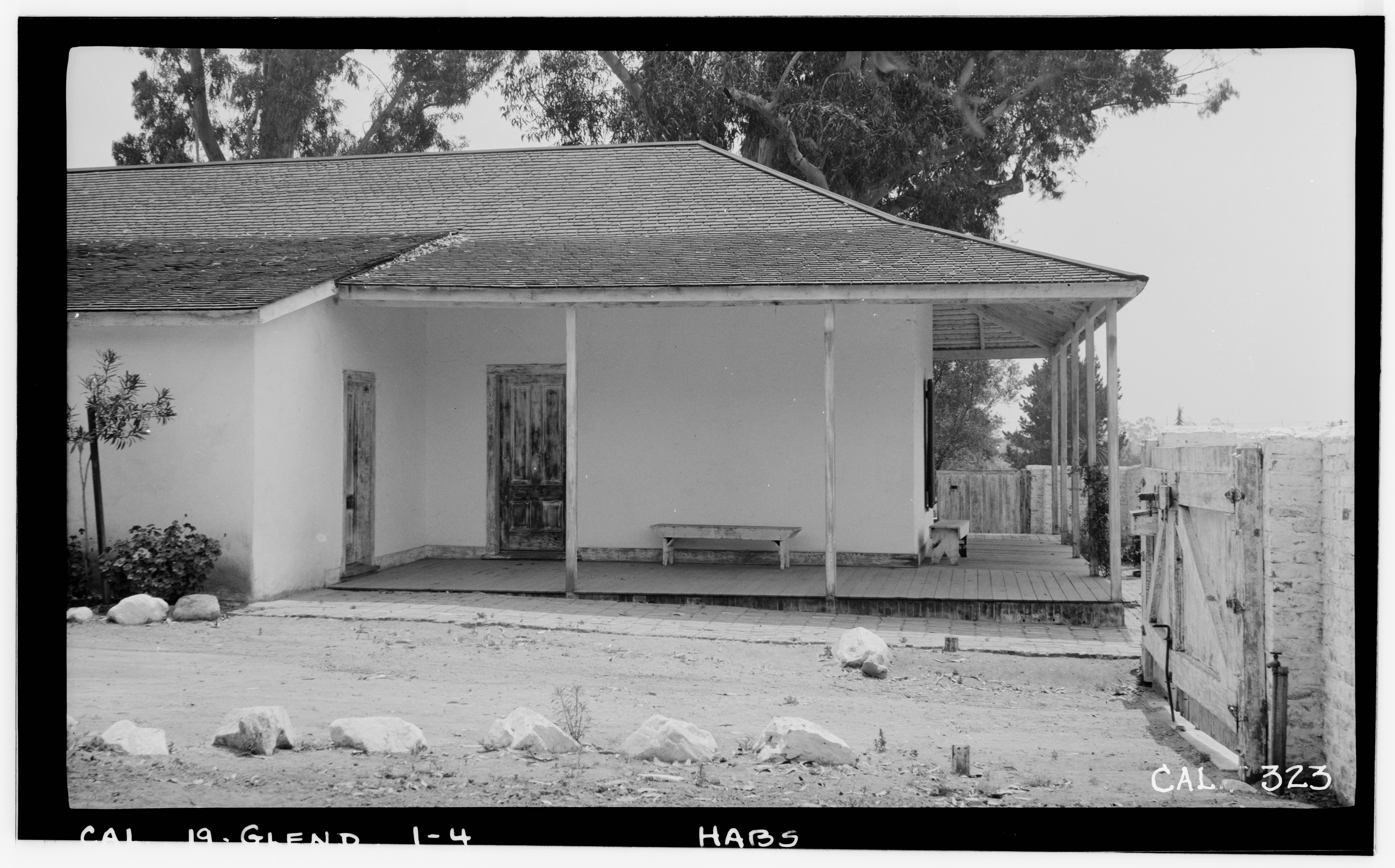
Casa Adobe de San Rafael in 1936

Casa Adobe de San Rafael is one of the oldest homes in Glendale, California. The home has been in continuous use since its founding in 1865. It was designated a California Historic Landmark (No. 235) on October 31, 1935.

Jose Maria Verdugo petitioned Pedro Fages, Governor of Alta California, for a Spanish land grant in October in 1784. When granted it was the first of the Rancho grants and one of the largest grants. The grant called Rancho San Rafael was a 36,403-acre (147.32 km^{2}) in the San Rafael Hills, bordering the Los Angeles River and the Arroyo Seco in present-day Los Angeles County, southern California.

When parts of Rancho San Rafael were sold, Tomas Avila Sanchez, Sheriff of Los Angeles County, purchased a tract of 100 acres and in 1865 built this artistic adobe home of the hacienda type. In 1867, Sanchez married Maria Sepulveda (daughter of Fernando Sepulveda and Maria Josefa Dominguez). Maria's stepfather gave her 100 acres (40 ha) of land and she and Tomas built Casa Adobe de San Rafael which is situated approximately a half-mile from the original Verdugo Adobe. The site of the original Verdugo Adobe is now the Hoover High School. A line of trees bordered the road that separated the two adobe sites. Tomas lived in Casa Adobe de San Rafael until his death in 1882. Maria and her family lived at the Casa Adobe for a few years after Tomas death. Maria sold the Casa and here land, 100 acres, to Andrew Glassell for $12,000. Maria and her family moved to Los Angeles.

The Casa Adobe was sold a number of times. In the 1920 the old home was in poor shape. Glendale community women groups took the case of the historic home to the City of Glendale. City of Glendale purchased the property in early 1930s including its gardens and eucalyptus trees. The City of Glendale trees were grown from seeds. The seeds were a gift of Phineas Banning, who had received them from an Australian missionary. The home was restored in 1932. The City of Glendale founded the San Rafael Association to care for Casa Adobe. San Rafael Association decorated the casa to look like a home in the late 19th century. The park grounds cover 1.6 acres.

A Fiesta de las Luminarias (Festival of Lights) and Christmas Open House is held during the month of December.

== See also ==
- California Historical Landmarks in Los Angeles County
- List of California Ranchos
- Ranchos of Los Angeles County, California
