= Glendale City Hall =

Seat of Glendale's government

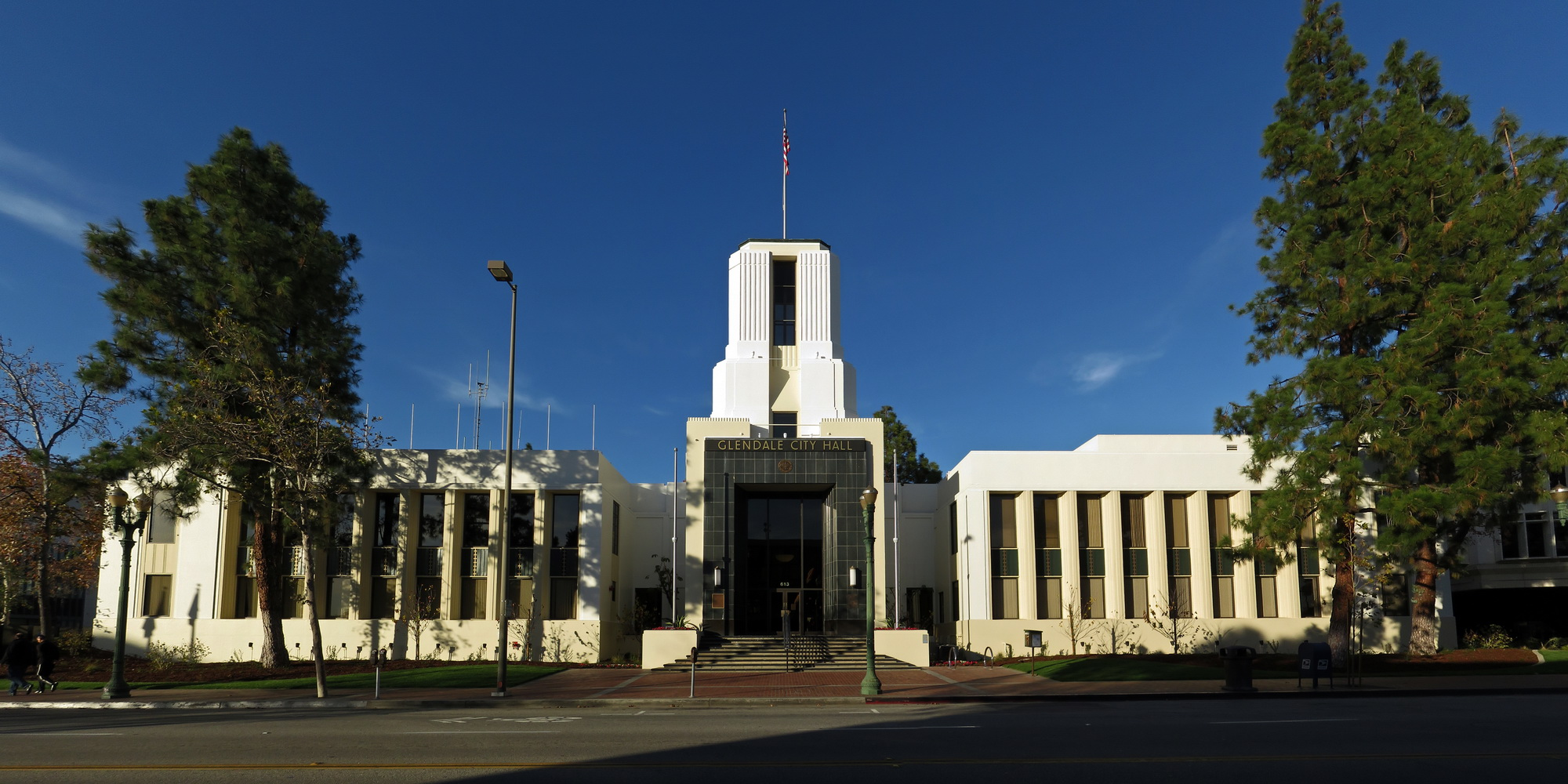
- Interactive map of the Glendale City Hall area

General information
- Status: Completed
- Type: Government offices
- Architectural style: Art Deco
- Location: 613 East Broadway, Glendale, CA 91206
- Coordinates: 34.1467°N 118.2486°W
- Completed: 1942; 84 years ago
- Owner: City of Glendale

Glendale City Hall is the center of the government of the city of Glendale, California, and houses the offices of the mayor, city attorney, and city clerk, and the offices and meeting chamber of the city council. It is located in the city's Civic Center.

Completed in 1942, it is a Works Progress Administration project in the PWA Moderne style.

== History ==
In 1942, a new Glendale City Hall, a Works Progress Administration project in the PWA Moderne style, was completed on the site of Glendale's first permanent City Hall from 1912.

Additions to the building include the west wing expansion in 1957, the east wing expansion in 1977, and a lobby renovation in 2010.

In 1997, Glendale City Hall was added to Glendale Register of Historic Resources.

== In popular culture ==
Glendale City Hall was used to depict a police station in the 2000 film Dude, Where's My Car?.

== See also ==
- Glendale Register of Historic Resources and Historic Districts
