= Catalina Verdugo Adobe =

Historical home and park in Glendale, California

- U.S. National Register of Historic Places
- California Historical Landmark
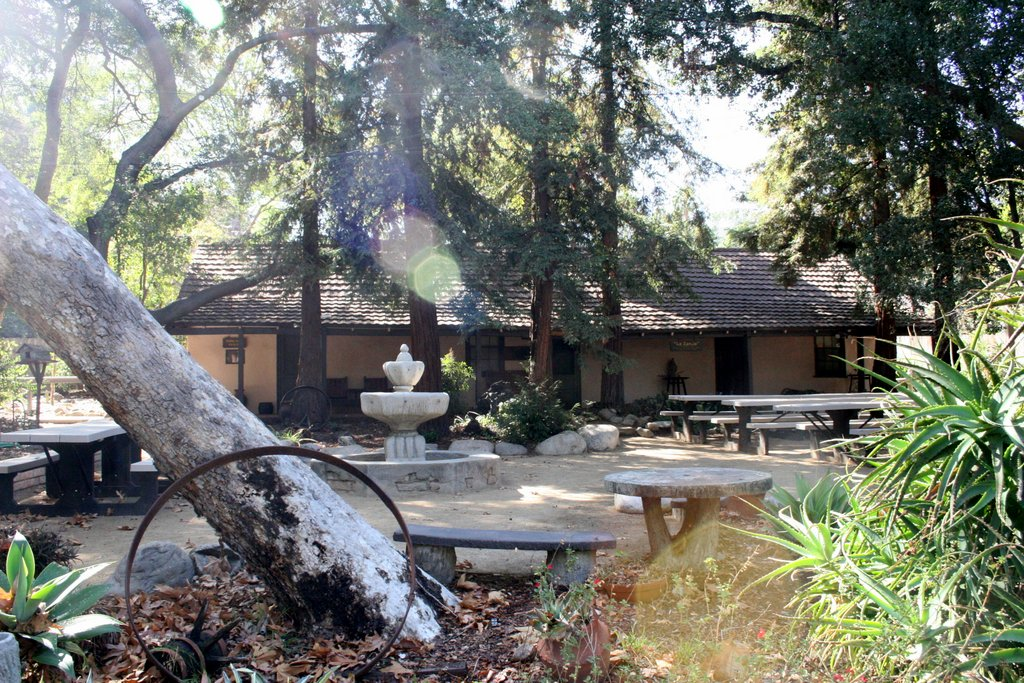
- Location: 2211 Bonita Dr. Glendale, California
- Coordinates: 34°10′48″N 118°13′56″W
- Built: 1828–1830s
- Architectural style: Adobe
- NRHP reference No.: 76000487
- CHISL No.: 637
- Added to NRHP: December 12, 1975

The Catalina Verdugo Adobe, also known as the Catalina Adobe, the Verdugo Adobe, and the Teodoro Adobe, is a historic adobe building and a public park located at 2211 Bonita Drive in Glendale, California.

== History ==
The adobe was built on a small portion of the Rancho San Rafael which was granted to José María Verdugo in 1784. Jose Maria Verdugo's grandson, Teodoro Verdugo, built the adobe on a small portion of the rancho. Some sources indicate that the adobe was built for José María Verdugo's blind daughter, Catalina, who lived there until her death in 1871.

The most probable date of construction was between 1828 and the 1830s, which are claimed by the City of Glendale and California Parks Service, respectively.

Other sources indicate that Catalina lived in the adobe with Teodoro and his family up until her death in 1861.

== Preservation ==
The adobe was designated as the first entry on the Glendale Register of Historic Resources. It was also registered in 1958 as California Historical Landmark No. 637. In 1976, the adobe along with the nearby "Oak of Peace" were listed on the National Register of Historic Places. The property is now owned by the City of Glendale and is operated as a historic park.

== Markers ==
Markers on the site read:

- Marker at entrance: San Rafael Ranch - Jose Maria Verdugo granted land use by Gov. Pedro Fages, 1784 Deed recorded, 1799. State Historic Landmark No. 637. National Register of Historical Places – 1976
- Marker at entrance: Oak of Peace - Site of pre-surrender conference between the Mexican settlers and a representative of the invading American forces on January 11, 1847. Jesus Pico, acting as an emissary from Lt. Col. Fremont, met under the oak with General Andres Pico and Governor Flores of the Californios to urge the signing of the treaty.
- San Rafael Rancho First granted to José Maria Verdugo, Oct. 20, 1784 Catalina Adobe built about 1828 and General Andres Pico oak tree camp site before he surrendered to John C. Fremont 1847 Marked by California Parlor No. 247 Native Daughters of the Golden West Sept. 28, 1947
- 637 Catalina (Verdugo) Adobe San Rafael Rancho of Jose Maria Verdugo Built about 1828 Placed by Don Jose Verdugo Chapter Daughters of the American Revolution 1958

== See also ==
- Glendale Register of Historic Resources and Historic Districts
- Rancho San Rafael
