= Alex Theatre =

- U.S. National Register of Historic Places
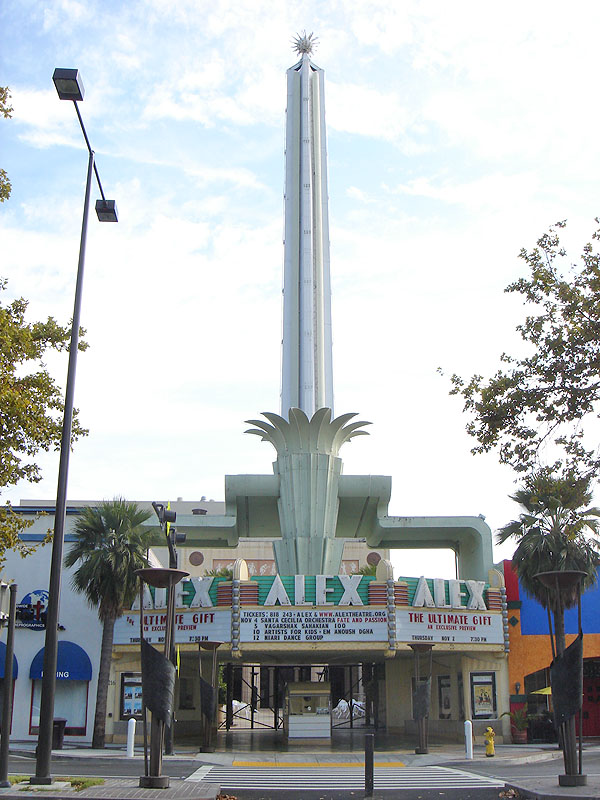
- The Alex Theatre in 2006

- Location within the Los Angeles metropolitan area Location within California Location within the United States
- Location: 216 North Brand Boulevard; Glendale, California
- Coordinates: 34°8′55.62″N 118°15′17.20″W
- Built: 1925
- Architect: Lindley & Selkirk Associates; Et al.
- Architectural style: Classical Revival, Art Deco, Moderne
- NRHP reference No.: 96000102
- Added to NRHP: February 16, 1996

The Alex Theatre is a historic performing arts and entertainment venue in Glendale, California, United States. Built in 1925, it has served as a landmark movie palace, community hub, and cultural anchor for the region. The theatre seats 1,400 and is known for its distinctive 100-foot neon tower designed by S. Charles Lee in 1940. After a major restoration in 1993, the Alex was added to the National Register of Historic Places in 1996. Owned by the City of Glendale, the venue was managed by Glendale Arts from 2008 to 2021 before transitioning to SAS Entertainment Partners. It continues to host concerts, theatrical productions, film screenings, television tapings, and special events, drawing audiences from across Southern California.

== Architecture ==
The Alex Theatre originally opened in 1925 as the Alexander Theatre, and was designed by architects Arthur G. Lindley and Charles R. Selkirk Associates, although at least one written source attributes it to the architectural firm of Meyer & Holler. Lindley & Selkirk Associates also designed the Hotel Glendale. The interior combines neo-classic Greek and Egyptian architectural elements, inspired by the Egyptian Theatre in Hollywood.

In 1940, theater architect S. Charles Lee redesigned the exterior of the Alexander, adding the iconic neon tower, starburst sphere, and marquee that shortened the name to the Alex.

== History ==
The Alexander officially opened on September 4, 1925, operated by the West Coast–Langley Theatre Circuit. It featured vaudeville performances, plays, and silent movies. A large Wurlitzer organ provided live accompaniment.

Located near Walt Disney’s Hyperion studio, the Alex became his preferred site for previewing cartoons. Films such as National Velvet and Going My Way (both 1944) held previews there. A 1948 backstage fire caused $150,000 in damage.

The Alex thrived during the mid-20th century with blockbusters like Ben-Hur (1959). A CinemaScope screen and surround-sound were added in 1954.

=== Post-renovation management and programming (1994–present) ===
A city-funded restoration in 1993 revived the theatre and returned its 1940 neon tower. In 1996 it was added to the National Register of Historic Places.

Management briefly passed to Theatre Corporation of America, which withdrew in 1994. The City then created the Alex Regional Theatre (ART) Board, supported by a $415,000 annual subsidy until 2015.

The theatre installed a 70 mm projection system in 2026 to screen The Odyssey, which marked the first time it had shown a first-run film since Terminator 2: Judgment Day in 1991.

=== Glendale Arts era (2008–2021) ===
In 2008 the ART Board transitioned into the nonprofit Glendale Arts, which managed the Alex for over a decade. The group programmed more than 200 days annually, drew 70,000–90,000 patrons per year, generated $1.3 million in local business activity, and provided $84,000 in subsidies to resident companies that yielded $573,000 in ticket revenue.

==== Restoration and capital projects ====
Glendale Arts led a $6.5 million backstage expansion (2014) and the Illuminate Project (2015), which restored the neon tower and marquee. It also launched the Illuminate Dinner fundraiser to support upkeep. For these efforts, the Alex received Theatre of the Year (Los Angeles Historic Theatre Foundation), a Preservation Award (Glendale Historical Society), and Beautification of the Year (Montrose–Verdugo City Chamber of Commerce) in 2017.

==== Programming and notable events ====
The Alex hosted nationally recognized events including the RuPaul’s Drag Race season 9 finale (2017), NBC’s Bring the Funny finale (2019), and episodes of My Next Guest Needs No Introduction with David Letterman (2019–2020). It has appeared in numerous TV and film productions, including Criminal Minds, Glee, Curb Your Enthusiasm, Veronica Mars, You, and others.

Since 2015 the venue has also presented annual Wild Honey Orchestra benefit concerts supporting autism nonprofits, with tributes to The Beatles, The Beach Boys, The Band, Buffalo Springfield, The Kinks, and The Lovin’ Spoonful.

===== Notable performers =====
The Alex has hosted appearances by prominent artists and public figures, including:

- Jazz trumpeter Arturo Sandoval in benefit concerts (2014, 2015).
- Steve Martin and Martin Short for a Live Talks LA conversation (2014).
- Robby Krieger of The Doors in concert (2016).
- Actor Elliott Gould and singer Sally Kellerman at a M*A*S*H reunion screening (mid-2010s).
- Comedian Doug Benson taping a live show (2016).

=== Leadership changes and transition to SAS ===
In June 2021, Nina Crowe became CEO and Maria Sahakian COO of Glendale Arts. Sahakian had booked 3,400 events generating $30 million. Former CEO Elissa Glickman (2012–2021) remained as advisor.

In October 2021, the City awarded management to SAS Entertainment Partners, ending Glendale Arts’ tenure.

=== Resident companies ===
The Alex has hosted numerous resident companies. The Gay Men’s Chorus of Los Angeles performed more than 100 concerts there between 1994 and 2021. In 2018, a matinée was canceled due to a bomb threat.

The Musical Theatre Guild ended its tenure after 2023 when SAS ended its residency.

The Alex Film Society continues screenings, including The Three Stooges Big Screen Event (2024). The Glendale Youth Orchestra also performs regularly, entering its 36th season in 2025–26.

== Gallery ==
The Alex Theatre
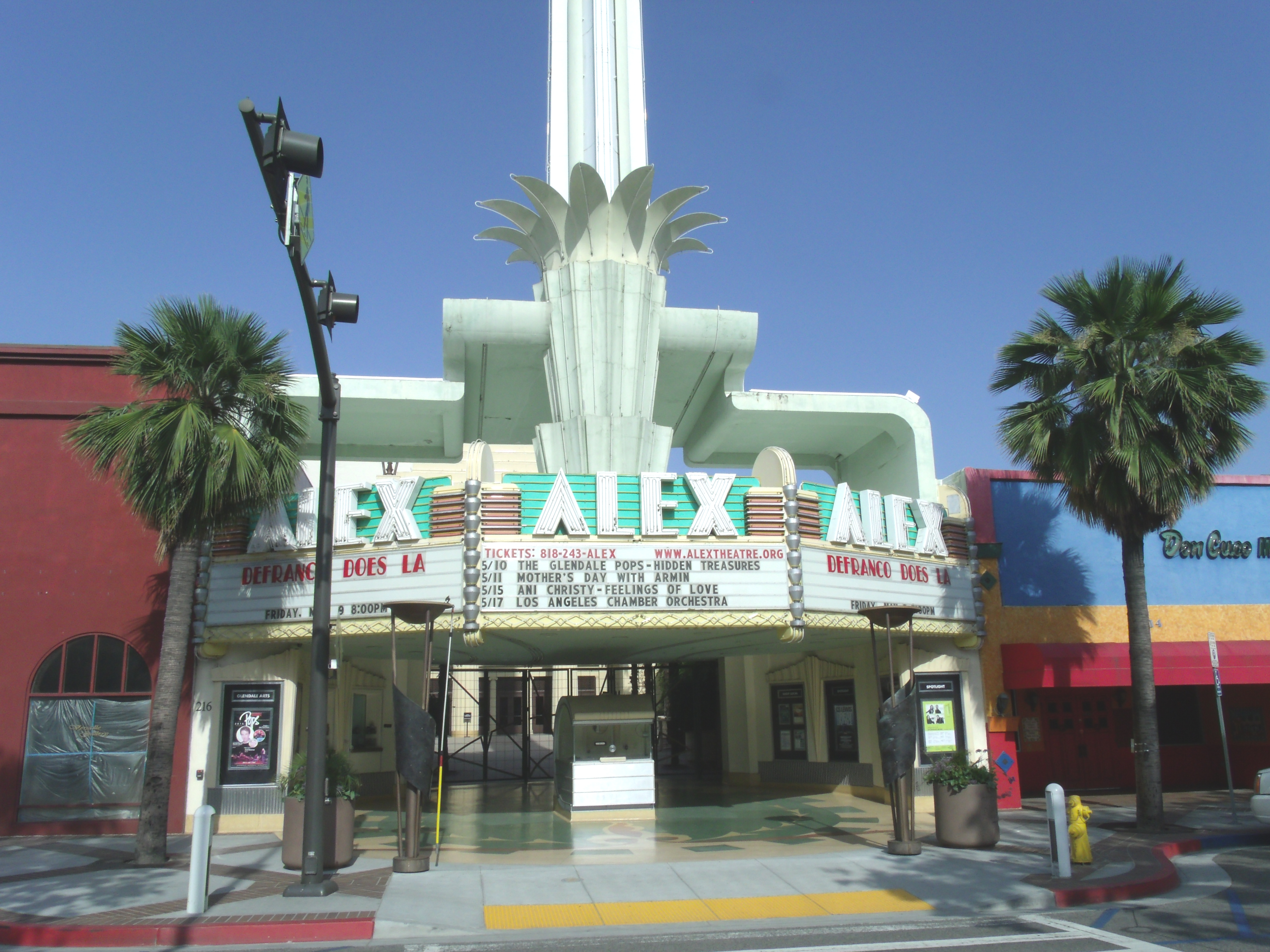
The Alex Theatre (2014)

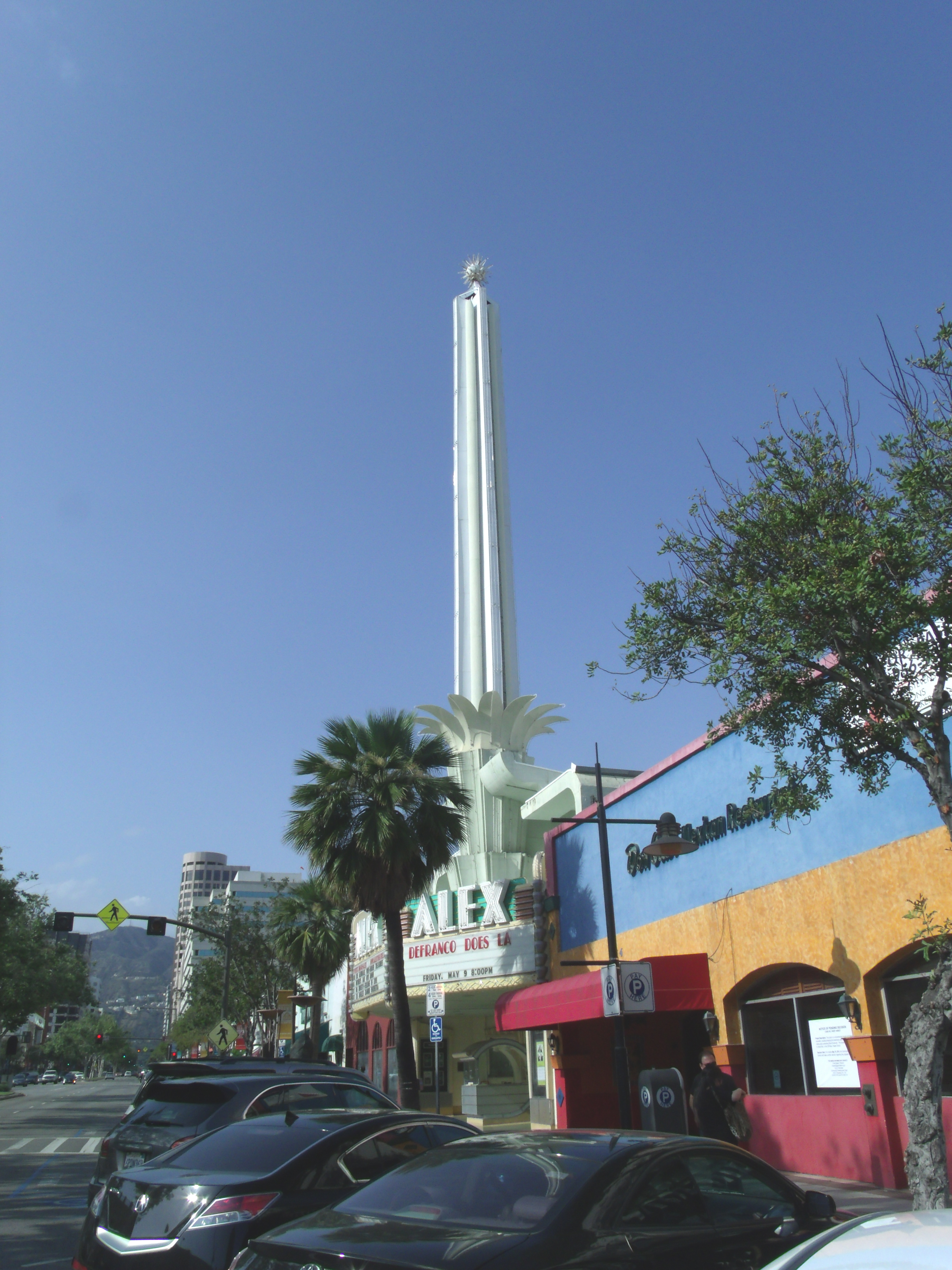
Side view with neon tower (2014)

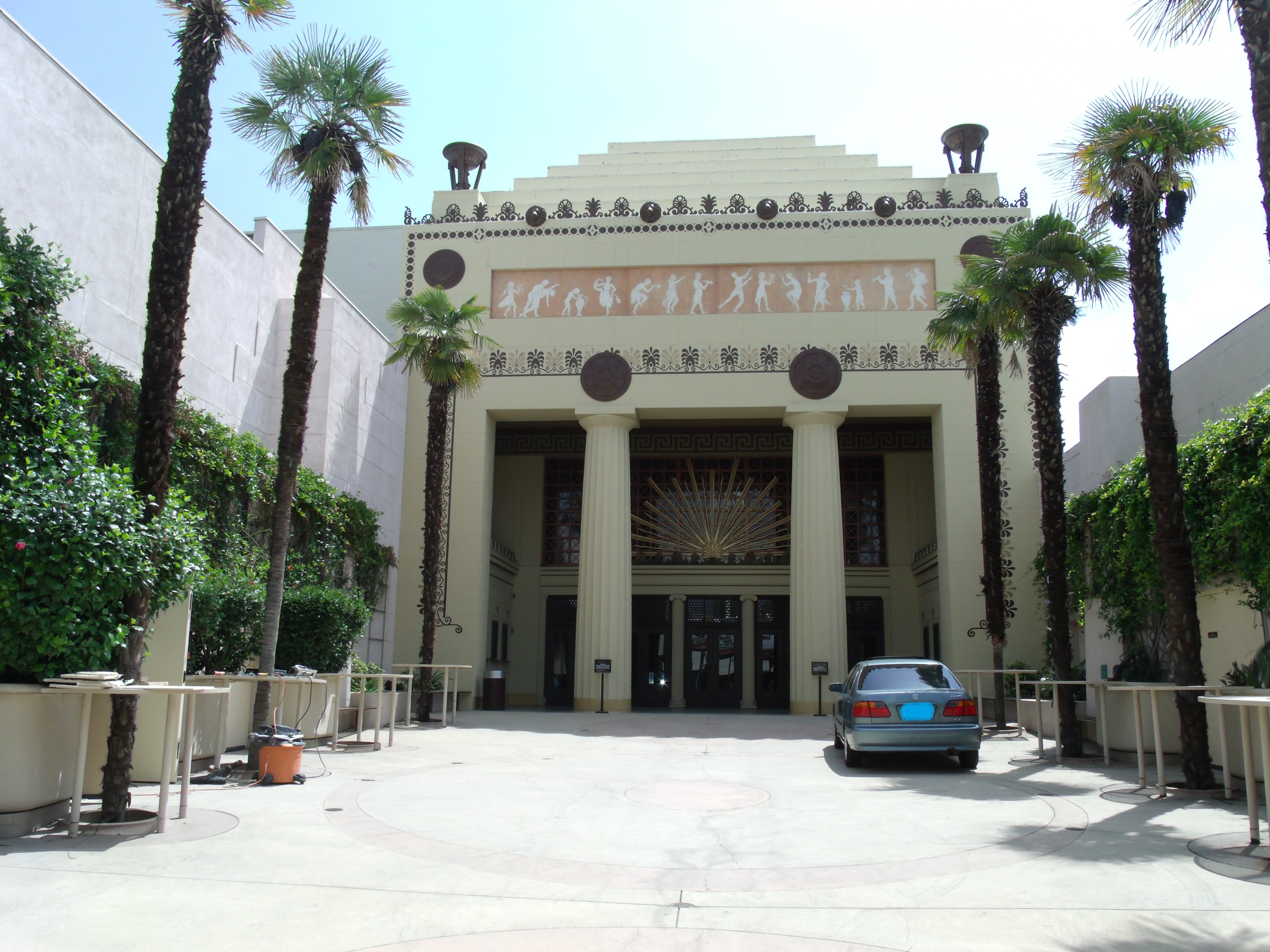
Courtyard

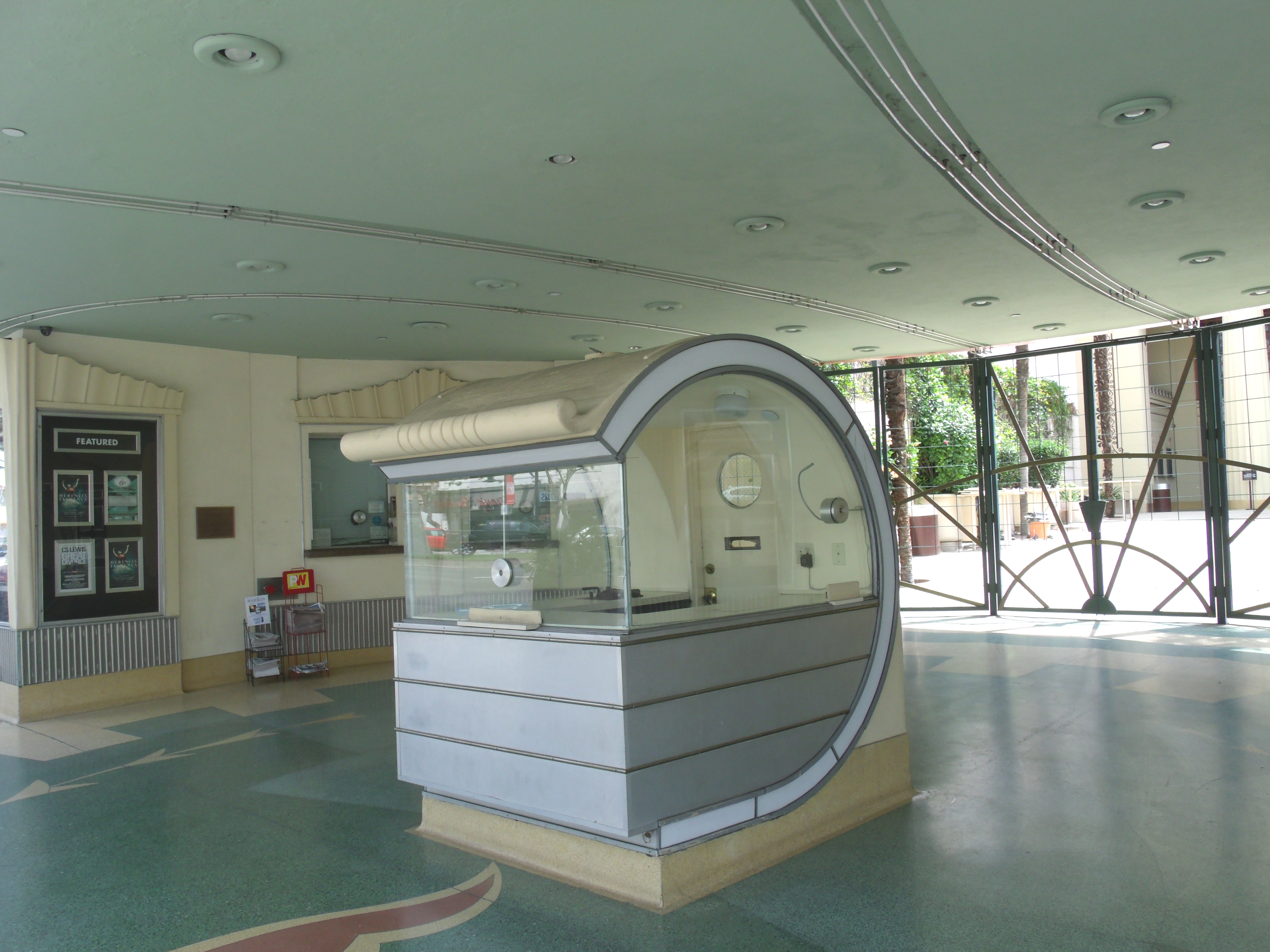
Ticket booth

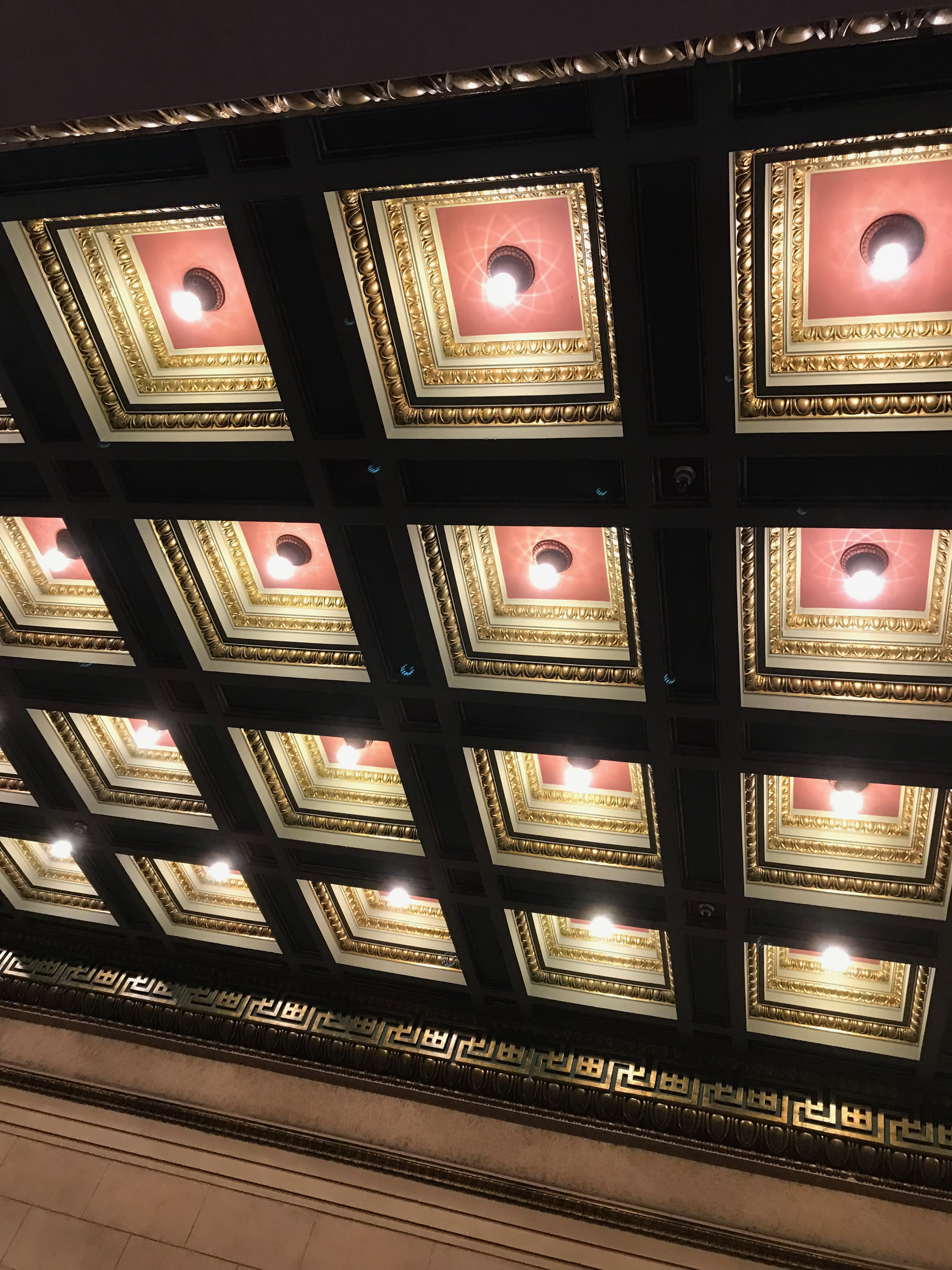
Ceiling inside auditorium

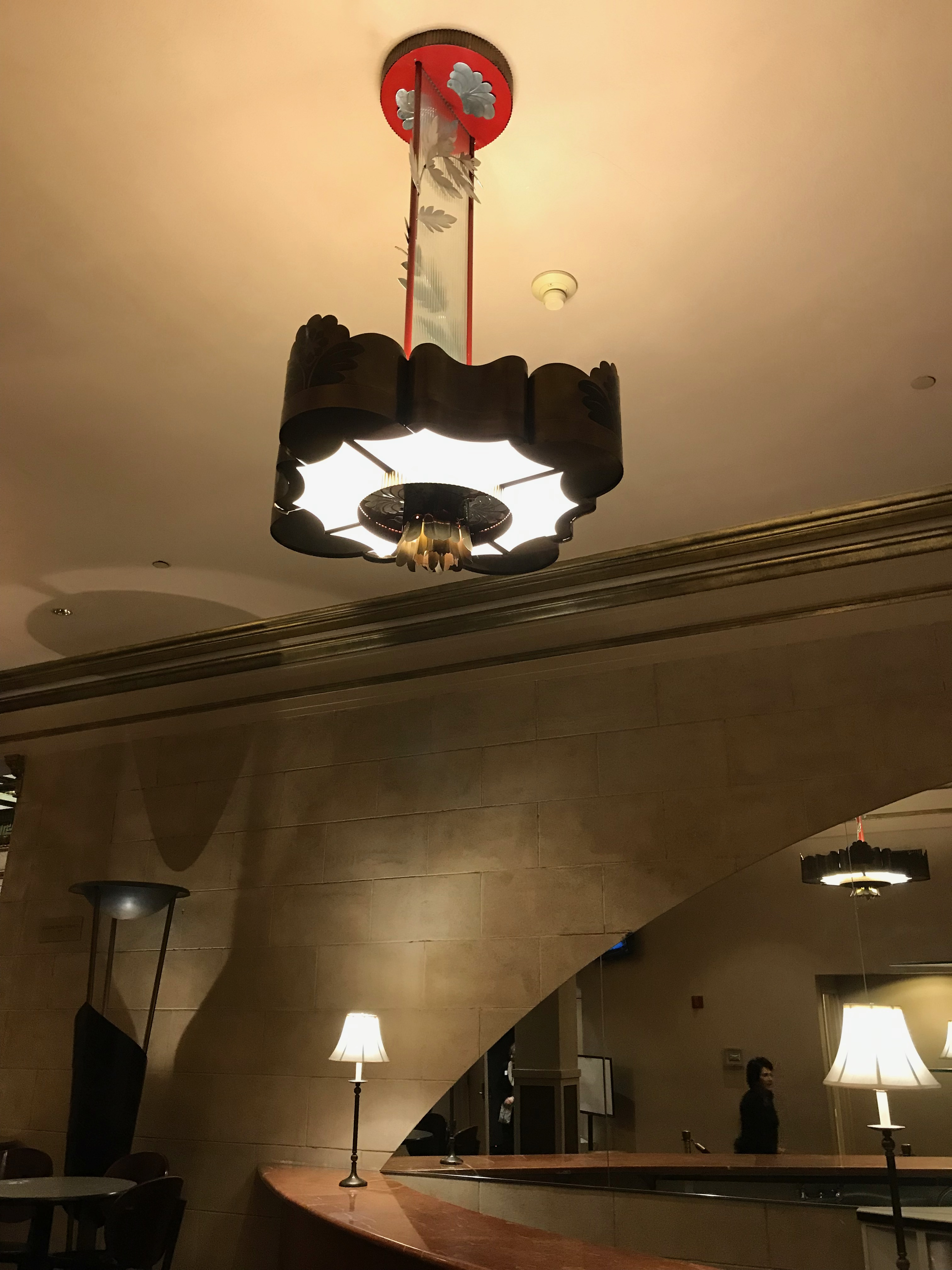
Interior light fixture

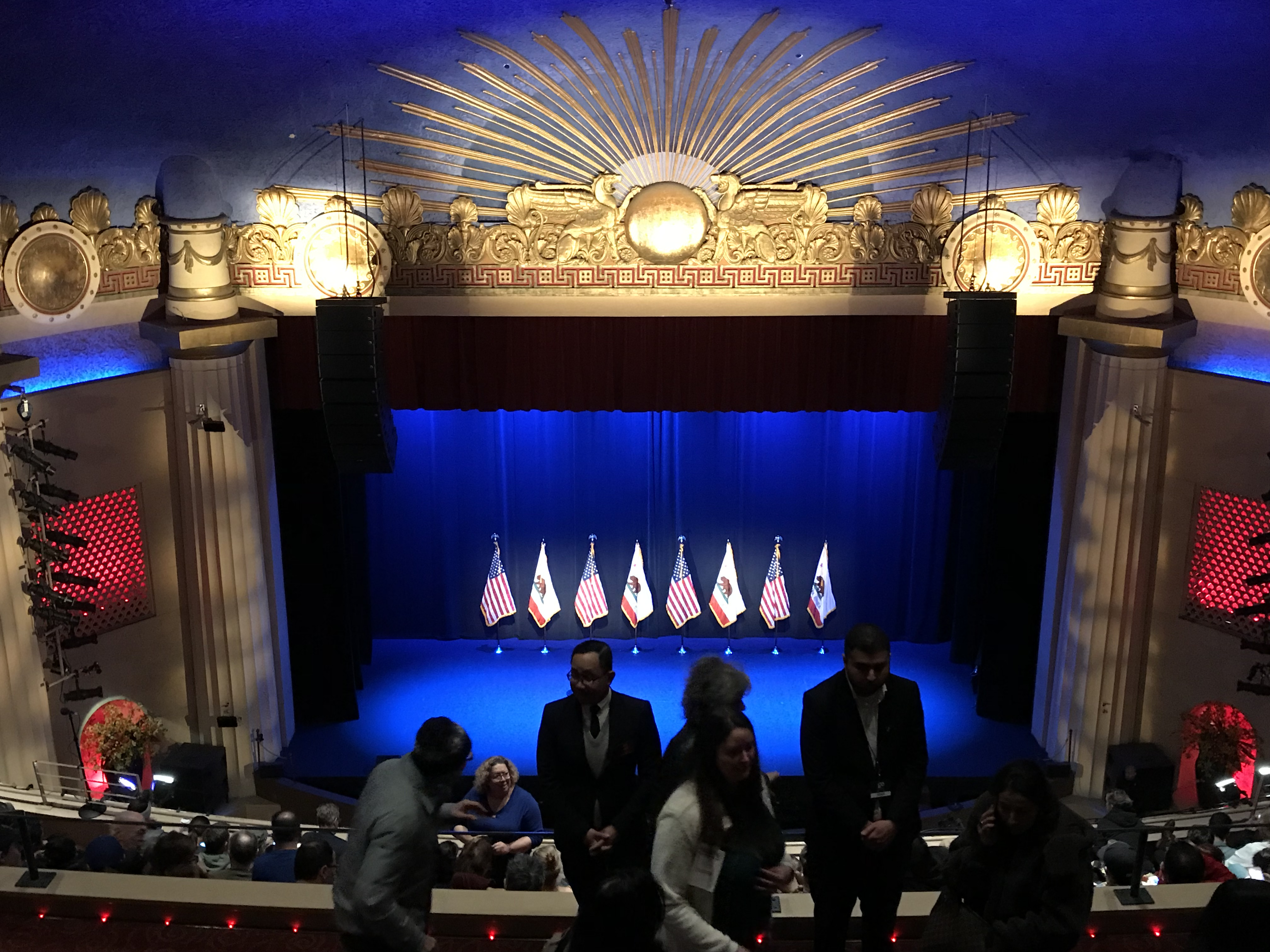
Proscenium

== See also ==
- Glendale Register of Historic Resources and Historic Districts
- List of National Historic Landmarks by state
- List of threatened historic sites in the United States
- History of the National Register of Historic Places
