= Hotel Glendale =

Historic hotel building in Glendale, California

- U.S. National Register of Historic Places
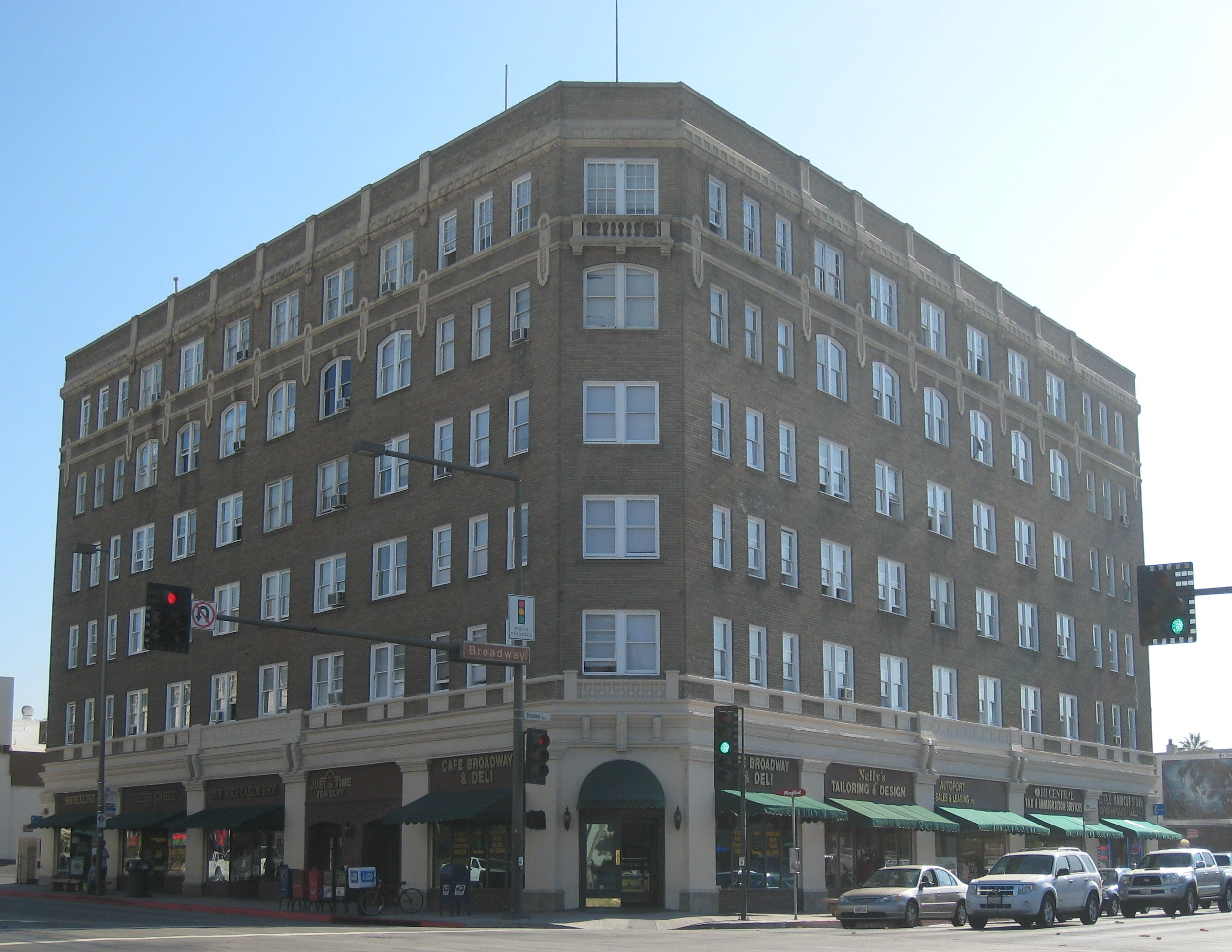
- Hotel Glendale in 2008

- Location within the Los Angeles metropolitan area Location within California Location within the United States
- Location: 701 East Broadway, Glendale, California
- Coordinates: 34°8′48″N 118°14′45″W
- Area: less than one acre
- Built: 1924
- Architect: Lindley & Selkirk Associates; Et al
- Architectural style: Beaux Arts
- NRHP reference No.: 94001197
- Added to NRHP: October 7, 1994

Hotel Glendale (currently Glendale Flats) is a historic hotel building in Glendale, California. It was built in the 1920s. It has been listed on the National Register of Historic Places since October 7, 1994.

== History ==
Between 1920 and 1924, Glendale's population more than doubled from about 14,000 to 42,000 residents. During this period, a group of developers, led by realtor Charles W. Ingledue, called the "East Glendale Advancement Association" embarked on constructing a new hotel in what they dubbed the "fastest-growing city in California". To fund the project, they initially attempted to establish the "Glendale Hotel Company" and raise money by selling stock, but after four failed fundraising attempts, financial constraints forced them to scale back the original 1923 plans, ultimately resulting in a six-story building that would hold both short-term and long-term residencies.

Architects Arthur G. Lindley and Charles R. Selkirk were chosen to design the hotel, which despite its scaled back plans, was the largest building in Glendale and only the second building in Glendale to surpass four stories. Concurrently, Lindley and Selkirk designed another Glendale landmark, the Alexander Theatre. The hotel was built between late 1924 and mid-1925, with the main entrance located at the angled corner. The grand opening was held in July 1925 with two-day reception. The city closed Glendale Avenue for a street dance, Spanish-themed costume ball, dinner, and live orchestra.

Despite an encouraging first year with 5,000 guests staying at the hotel, the hotel was soon deemed a commercial failure and transitioned exclusively to long-term rental apartments.

In 1977, the hotel was listed to the Glendale Register of Historic Resources. On October 7, 1994, it was listed on the National Register of Historic Places.

The building is currently called the Glendale Flats, and continues to only offer long-term rental apartments.

== Architecture ==
The Hotel Glendale was designed in the Beaux Arts style, along with decorative elements reminiscent of Spanish architecture, adorning the facade. Commercial spaces on the ground floor feature smooth concrete, while the upper floors are faced with brick. Cast concrete balusters on the second floor mimic balconies, with decorative brackets accentuating the entablature above the first floor. For many years following its construction, a neon sign reading "Hotel Glendale" sat on its roof.

== See also ==
- Glendale Register of Historic Resources and Historic Districts
- Alex Theatre
