= Garvanza, Los Angeles =

Garvanza
- Neighborhood of Los Angeles
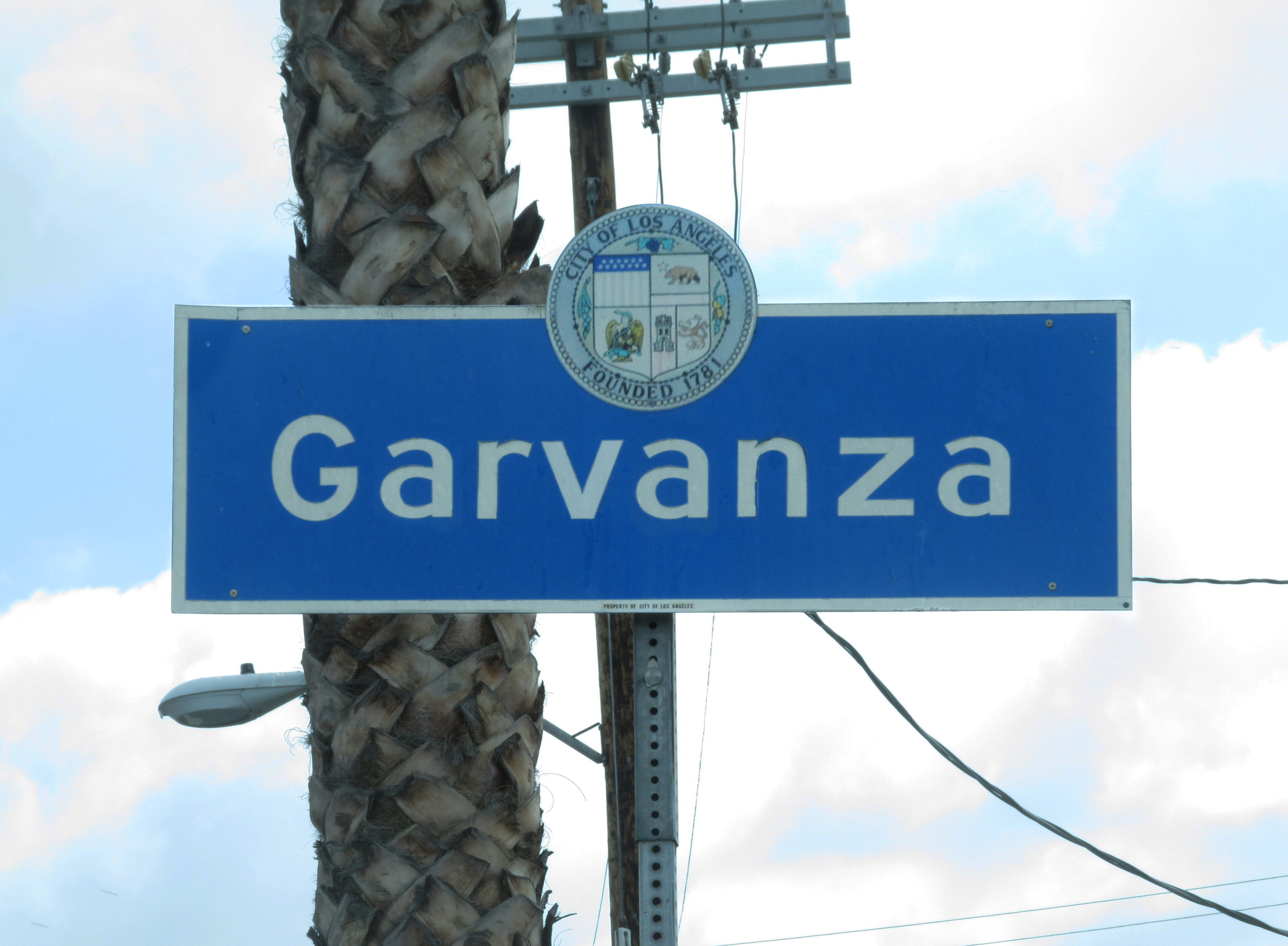
- Garvanza neighborhood sign located on York Boulevard at Figueroa Street

- Location within Central Los Angeles
- Coordinates: 34.118569°N 118.179237°W
- Country: United States
- State: California
- County: Los Angeles
- City: Los Angeles
- Time zone: UTC-8 (PST)
  - Summer (DST): UTC-7 (PDT)
- Zip code: 90042
- Area code: 323

Garvanza is a neighborhood in northeast Los Angeles. Fourteen Los Angeles Historic-Cultural Monuments are located in the neighborhood.

== History ==
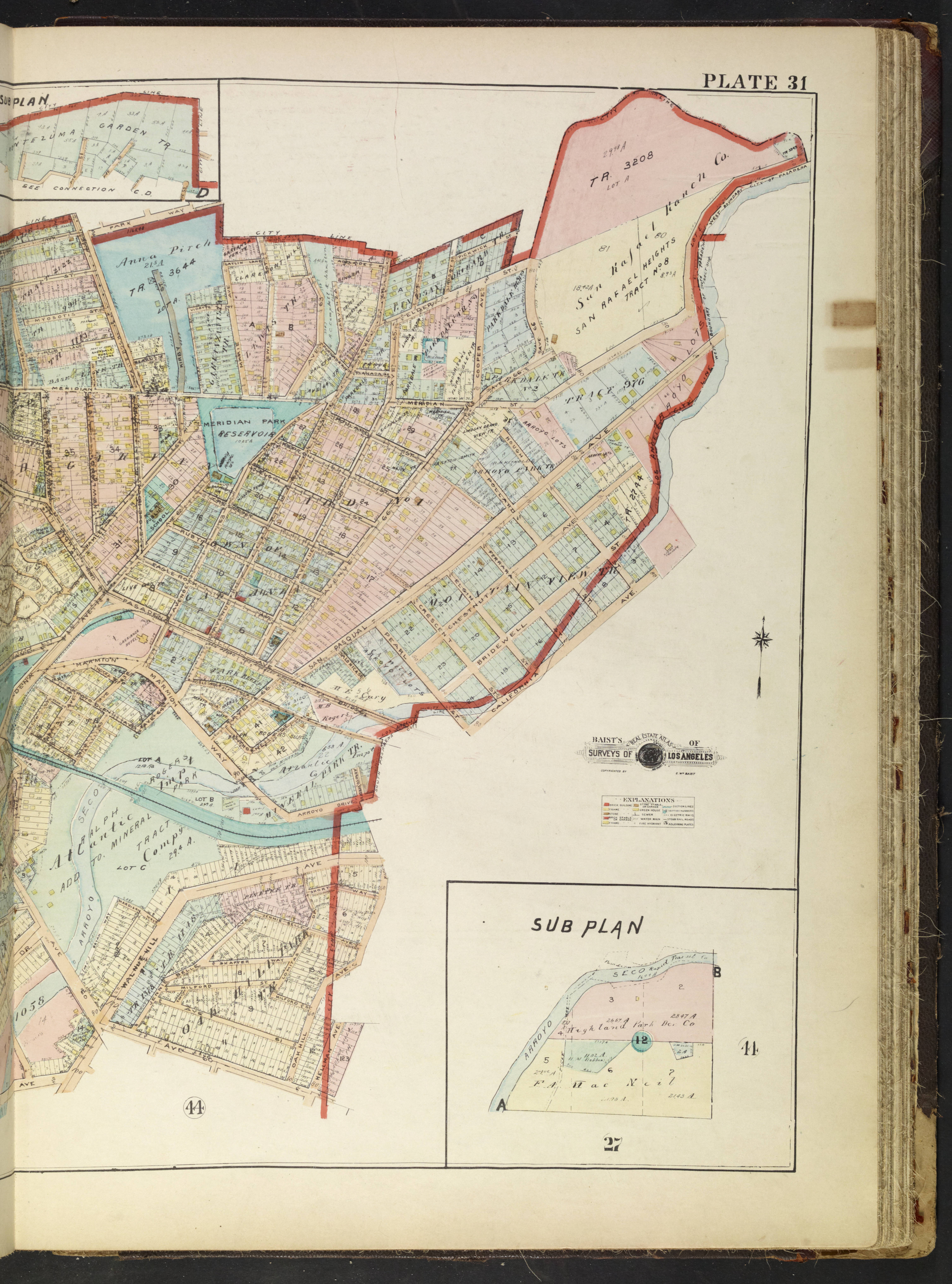
Garvanza, 1921

The town of Garvanza was originally part of the Rancho San Rafael, owned by Jose Maria Verdugo. Its name comes from the fields of garbanzo beans that once flourished in the area. Andrew Glassell and Alfred Beck Chapman bought the land in 1869. Glassell and Chapman sold the land to Ralph and Edward Rogers, real estate developers and brothers. In 1886 the Rogers brothers subdivided the land and began to sell lots in what they called the "Town of Garvanza". The town was annexed by the city of Los Angeles in 1899.

Garvanza was served by Henry Huntington's Los Angeles Railway (LARY) as early as 1902, and the LARY had a direct line from Garvanza to Downtown Los Angeles by 1904. By 1907, Huntington had extended the Garvanza line in two directions: along York Blvd. and along North Figueroa Street.

Two bridges connect Los Angeles and South Pasadena through Garvanza. One, the Los Angeles and San Gabriel Valley Railroad railroad bridge spanning the Arroyo Seco, was first built at grade in wood in 1885, and has been rebuilt twice at the current location since then, first in wood in 1889 and then in steel in 1896. The current steel bridge, which is listed as Los Angeles Historic Cultural Monument No. 339, was modified for dual tracks a century later for use in the current light rail system. The York Boulevard bridge over the Arroyo Seco Parkway was built to replace a small wooden toll bridge which was inadequate to support the growing traffic between South Pasadena and Los Angeles. The old toll house still exists on the South Pasadena side.

The Judson Studios, which created much of the stained glass that graced Craftsman and Mission structures in Southern California, have been located in Garvanza since 1911.

In the early 20th century, Garvanza was considered an enclave of the local Arts and Crafts movement.

In 1997, the city of Los Angeles officially redesignated the area "Garvanza." Garvanza is incorporated into the City of Los Angeles "Highland Park-Garvanza HPOZ (Historic Preservation Overlay Zone) Preservation Plan" area adopted by the Los Angeles City Council December 9, 2010. On July 25, 2019, the Garvanza Improvement Association was awarded a preservation award by the Los Angeles Conservancy.

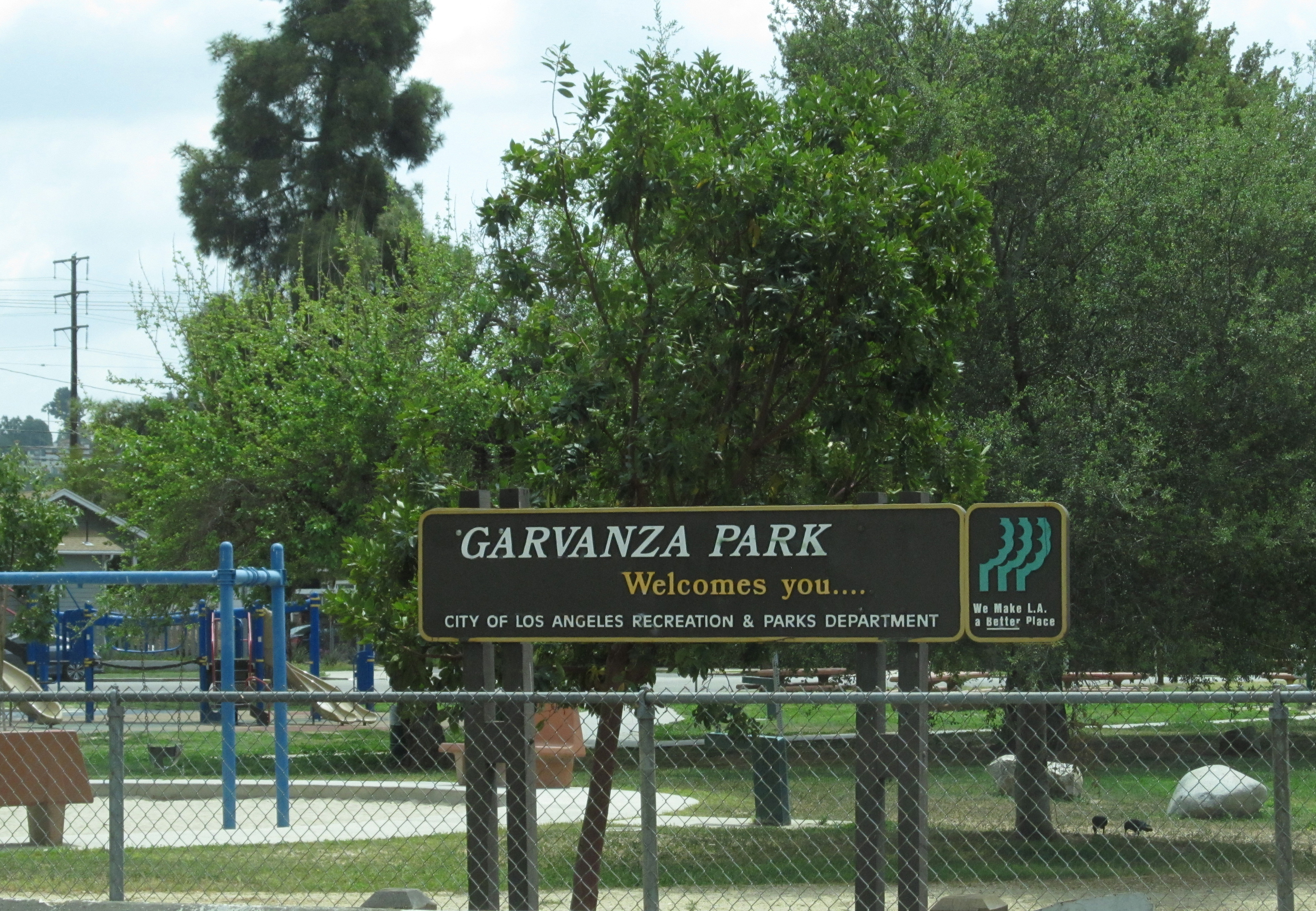
Garvanza Park, 2021

== Geography ==
Garvanza is bordered by Figueroa Street on the west, Pasadena city limits on the north, San Pascual Avenue/110 Freeway on the east and York Boulevard on the south. Highland Park is west, South Pasadena and Hermon are east. Official city signage was installed in 1997.

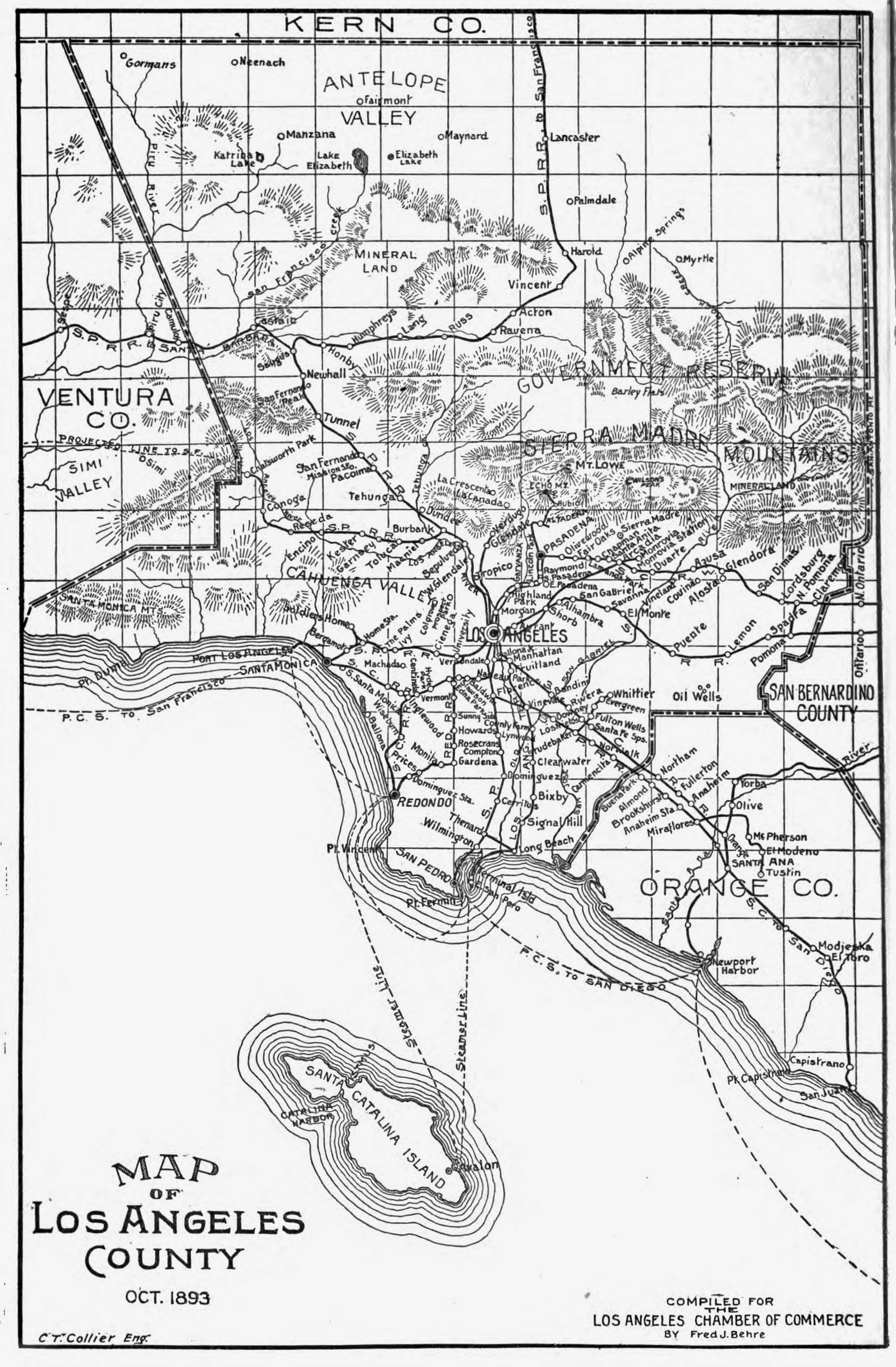
Garvanza on a map of Los Angeles County published October 1893 for the World's Columbian Exposition

== Parks and recreation ==
- Garvanza Park - 6240 East Meridian Street.
- Garvanza Skate Park - 6240 East Meridian Street.

== Education ==
The Los Angeles Unified School District operates district schools.

- Garvanza Elementary School - 317 N. Avenue 62, Los Angeles, CA 90042.

== Los Angeles Historic-Cultural Monuments ==
Garvanza has fifteen Los Angeles Historic-Cultural Monuments:

- Judson Studios - 200 S. Avenue 66, Los Angeles Historic-Cultural Monument No. 62
- Abbey San Encino - 6211 Arroyo Glen Street, Los Angeles Historic-Cultural Monument No. 106
- McClure Residence - 432 N. Avenue 66, Los Angeles Historic-Cultural Monument No. 107
- Santa Fe's Arroyo Seco Bridge - 162 S. Avenue 61, Los Angeles Historic-Cultural Monument No. 339
- Frederic M. Ashley House - 740-742 N. Avenue 66, Los Angeles Historic-Cultural Monument No. 402
- Robert Edmund Williams House aka Hathaway Home for Children - 480 N. Avenue 66, Los Angeles Historic-Cultural Monument No. 411
- Garvanza Pumping Station and site of Highland Reservoir - 420 N. Avenue 62, Los Angeles Historic-Cultural Monument No. 412
- George W. Wilson Estate - 616 N. Avenue 66, Los Angeles Historic-Cultural Monument No. 418 (Destroyed by fire on December 15, 1989)
- Fargo House - 206 Thorne Street, Los Angeles Historic-Cultural Monument No. 464
- Dr. Franklin S. Whaley Residence - 6434 Crescent Street, Los Angeles Historic-Cultural Monument No. 528
- Charles H. Greenshaw Residence - 1102 Lantana Drive, Los Angeles Historic-Cultural Monument No. 565
- Monroe Cottage - 6310 Crescent Street, Los Angeles Historic-Cultural Monument No. 894
- Stewart Farmhouse - 126 N. Avenue 63, Los Angeles Historic-Cultural Monument No. 1028 (Moved from 511 W. 31st Street after designation)
- Donnelly House - 1121 N. Avenue 64. Los Angeles Historic-Cultural Monument No. 1041
- Throop House - 902 San Pascual Avenue, Los Angeles Historic-Cultural Monument No. 1261

== Notable people ==
- Cora Scott Pond Pope (1856-?), suffragist, teacher, pageant writer, real estate developer

== Historical photos ==
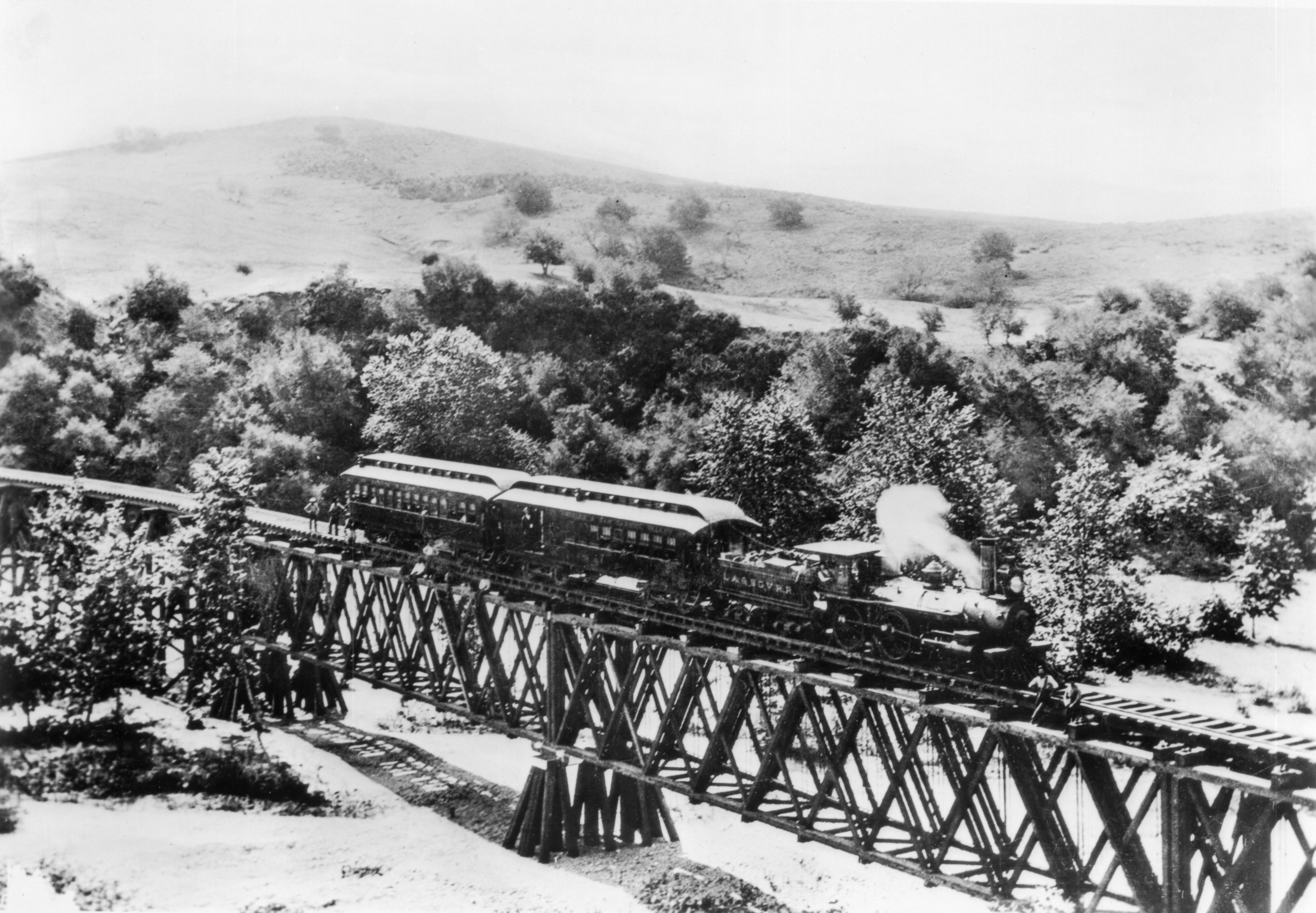
1886 view of the Los Angeles and San Gabriel Railroad crossing the Arroyo Seco at Garvanza

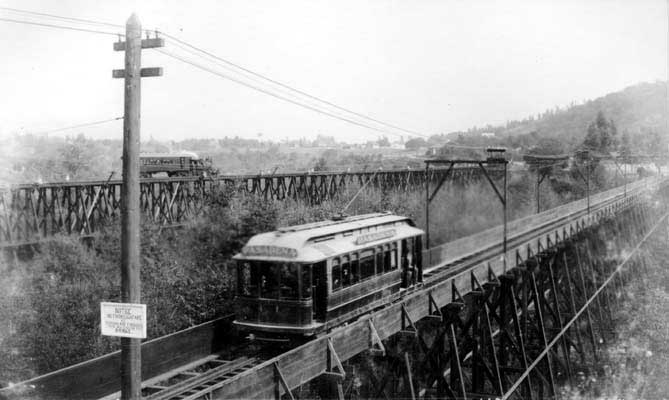
1895:Pasadena and Los Angeles Electric Railway and Los Angeles and the Los Angeles and Salt Lake Railroad train in the Arroyo Seco at Garvanza

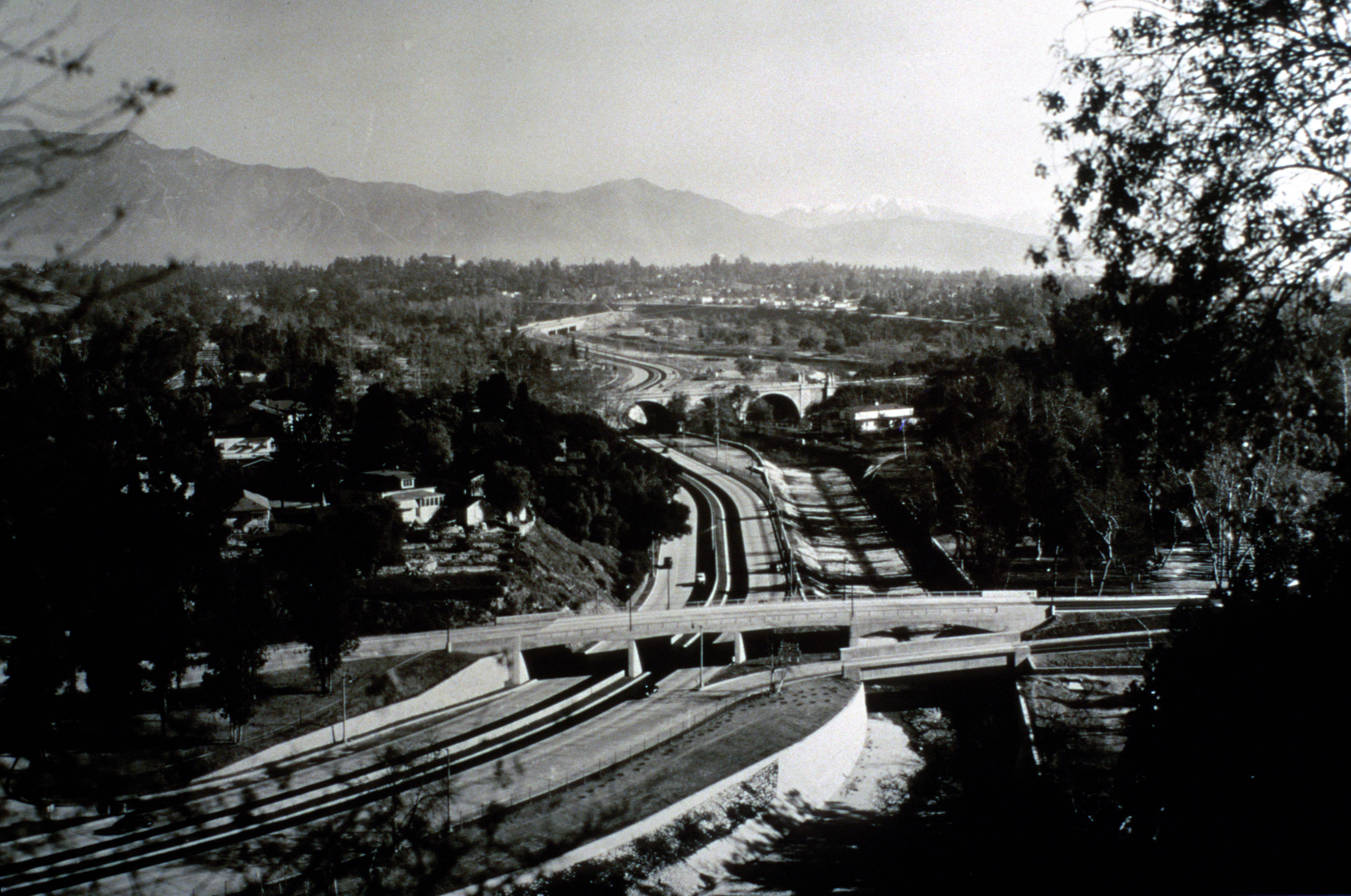
York Boulevard bridge (background) and The Marmion Way (foreground) bridge over the Arroyo Seco Parkway in 1940
