= James Daniel Derby House =

Historic house in California, United States

- U.S. National Register of Historic Places
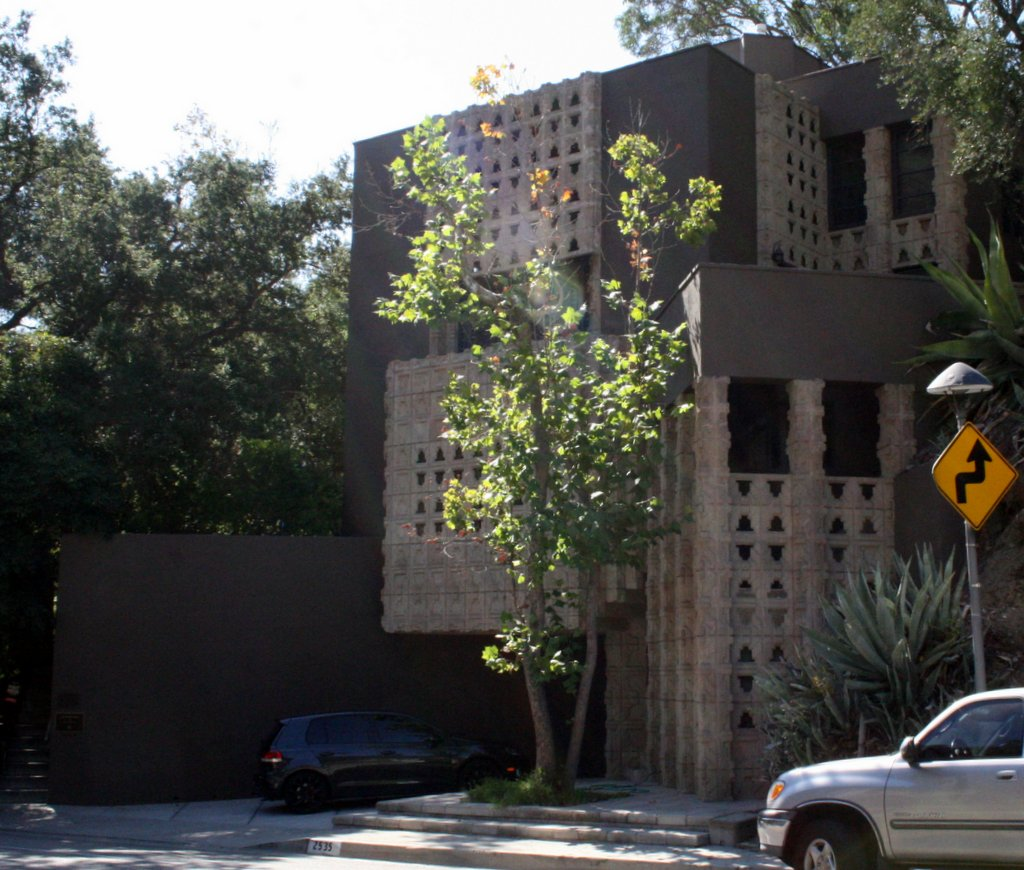
- The James Derby House in 2014

- Location within California Location within the United States
- Location: 2535 East Chevy Chase Drive, Glendale, California
- Coordinates: 34°9′42″N 118°12′41.3″W
- Area: 0.3 acres (0.12 ha)
- Built: 1926
- Architect: Lloyd Wright
- Architectural style: American Modernistic
- NRHP reference No.: 78000682
- Added to NRHP: December 14, 1978

The James Daniel Derby House is a historic house in Glendale, California, U.S.. It was built in 1926 for James Daniel Derby. It was designed in the American Modernistic architectural style with Mayan features by Lloyd Wright. It has been listed on the National Register of Historic Places since December 14, 1978. It remains a private residence.

== See also ==
- Glendale Register of Historic Resources and Historic Districts
