= Statue of Miss American Green Cross =

Public sculpture in California

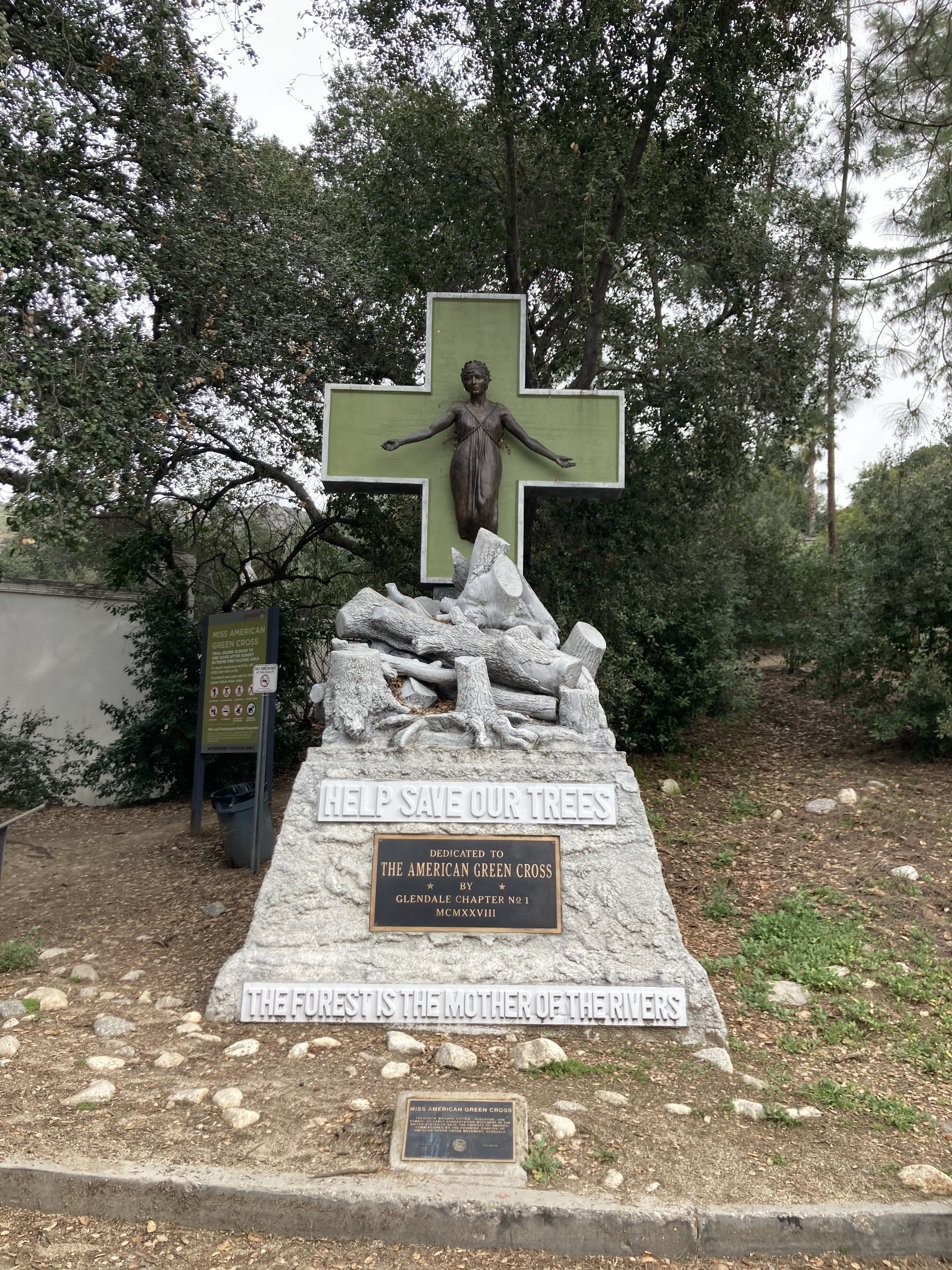
- The sculpture in 2024
- Artist: Frederick Willard Potter
- Year: 1928
- Medium: Bronze cast
- Location: Brand Park, Glendale, California; 34.1828°N 118.2767°W

The Statue of Miss American Green Cross in Glendale, California, is a 10-foot-high bronze cast statue (18 feet including the base) to "Miss American Green Cross" located in Brand Park, adjacent to the Brand Library & Art Center at 1601 W. Mountain Street.

The statue was created by sculptor Frederick Willard Potter and dedicated in 1928. Verlyn Sumner was the model for the work. The American Green Cross Society was formally created as a successor to the American Reforestation Association on December 3, 1926. The American Green Cross was an organization dedicated to preserving the country's forests, with headquarters based in Glendale.

The statue was originally displayed at the Glendale High School campus. It was moved in the 1930s and lost for two decades. In 1954, the statue was discovered in a remote canyon in Brand Park, though its large base was not present.

The statue was designated as one of the original Glendale city landmarks in 1977, by which time it had become damaged by vandals, its arms lost, and its cross and logs deteriorated. It was placed in storage at the Brand Park maintenance yard in the early 1980s. It was restored by the city at a cost of $60,000-$65,000 with the assistance of sculptor Ron Pekar. Its base and arms were recreated based on a historic photograph. The renovated statue was dedicated in September 1992 at its new location adjacent to the Brand Library.

The statue was added as one of the inaugural entries on the Glendale Register of Historic Resources (GRHR No. 12) in 1997.

== See also ==
- Glendale Register of Historic Resources and Historic Districts
