= Rancho San Rafael =

1784 Spanish land grant in California

Coordinates: 34.140°N 118.220°W

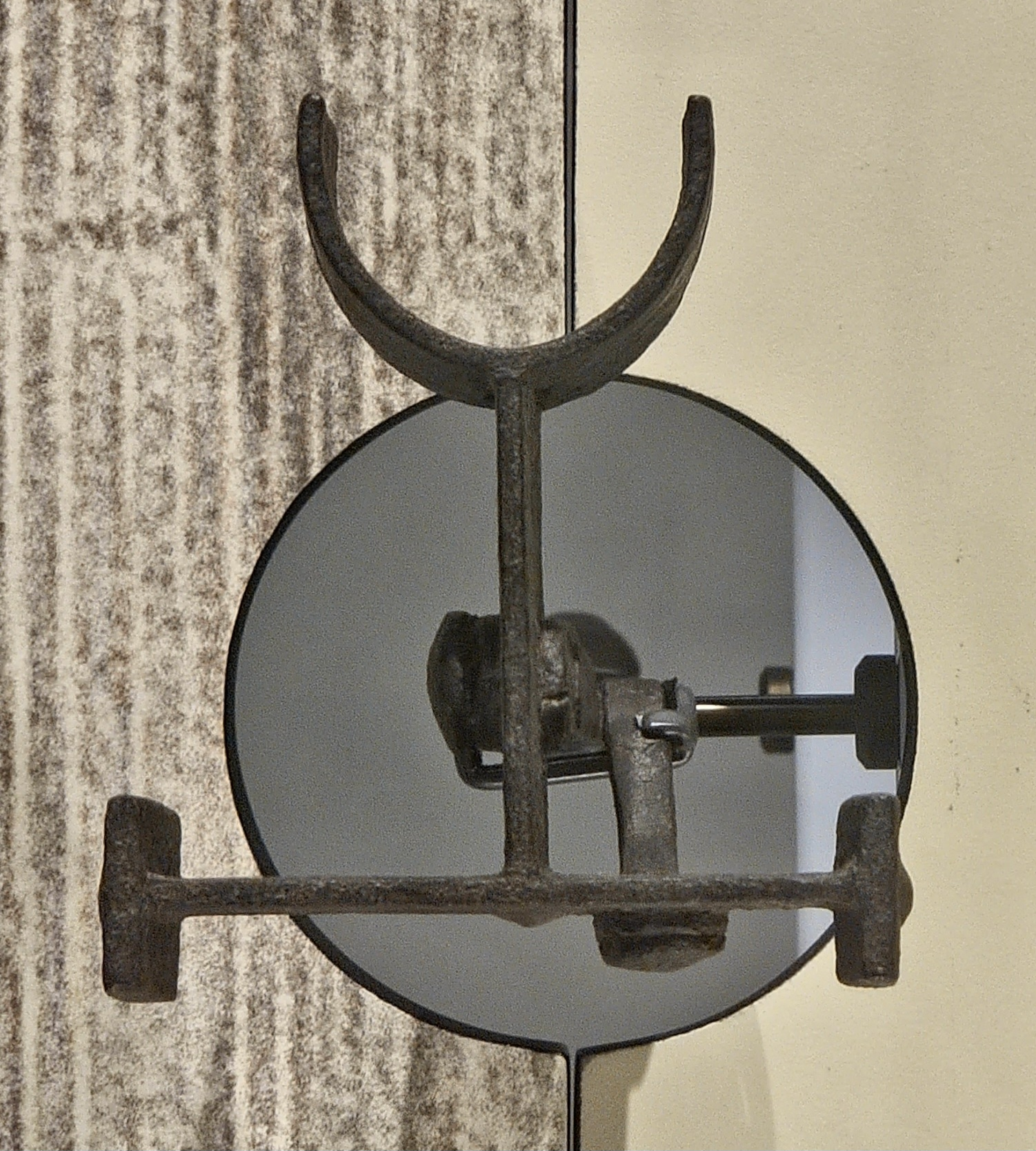
Head of branding iron with Rancho San Rafael's mark.

Rancho San Rafael was a 36,403-acre (147.32 km^{2}) Spanish land grant in present-day Los Angeles County, southern California, given in 1784 to Jose Maria Verdugo. It shares its name with the San Rafael Hills, and included land in the southeasternmost part of the San Fernando Valley.

== Geography ==
The rancho includes the present day cities of Burbank, Glendale, La Cañada Flintridge, the Glendale communities of Montrose and Verdugo City; as well as the city of Los Angeles neighborhoods of Atwater Village, Cypress Park, Eagle Rock, Garvanza, Glassell Park, Highland Park, and Mount Washington. and the portion of the city of Pasadena located west of the Arroyo Seco.

The rancho's boundaries were primarily defined by the Verdugo Mountains on the west, the Crescenta Valley and Rancho La Cañada on the north, the Arroyo Seco on the east, and the Los Angeles River on the south. The boundary followed north along the northeast bank of the L.A. River, and then wrapped westerly around present day Griffith Park to a point near the Travel Town Museum there.

== History ==
Corporal José María Verdugo (1751–1831), a Spanish soldier who had served with the 1769 Portola-Serra Expedition, received a provisional eight square league grant of the Rancho San Rafael in 1784, from his army commander Governor Pedro Fages, which was confirmed in 1798 by Governor Diego de Borica. In 1798 Verdugo retired from the army to become a full-time rancher. Verdugo died in 1831 and he left his property to his surviving son Julio Antonio Verdugo (1789–1876) and daughter María Catalina Verdugo (1799–1837).

With the cession of California to the United States following the Mexican–American War, the 1848 Treaty of Guadalupe Hidalgo provided that the land grants would be honored. As required by the Land Act of 1851, a claim was filed with the Public Land Commission in 1852, confirmed by the Commission in 1855, and the grant was patented to Julio and Catalina Verdugo in 1882.

In 1857, Jonathan R. Scott traded Rancho La Cañada to Julio and Catalina Verdugo for 4,607 acres (19 km^{2}) acres on the west side of Rancho San Rafael - what is today Burbank. In 1861 Julio and Catalina Verdugo split the rancho between southern (Julio) and northern (Catalina) portions.

In 1861, Julio Verdugo mortgaged a substantial portion of the Rancho to Jacob Elias under terms that he could not afford. By the late 1860s, several parcels of Rancho San Rafael had been either sold, or lost due to foreclosures. Many individuals were claiming ownership to multiple sections of the rancho. In 1871, law partners Alfred Chapman and Andrew Glassell filed a lawsuit, known as "The Great Partition", against thirty-six separate defendants. The plaintiffs contended that there were numerous alleged property owners occupying tracts of land whose boundaries were illegally established. Once the validity of the claims were proven, a partition was demanded. Ultimately, Rancho San Rafael was divided into thirty-one sections given to twenty-eight different people, some of which included members of the Verdugo family.

Name	Allotment	Notes
Benjamin Dreyfus	8,000 acres (32.4 km^{2})	Location of Tropico and most of Eagle Rock
Alfred Chapman and Andrew Glassell	5,745 acres (23.2 km^{2})	Lawyers. Location of Glassell Park, Los Angeles.
David Burbank	4,607 acres (18.6 km^{2})	Founder of Burbank. Burbank bought the land from Jonathan R. Scott in 1867.
Catalina and Teodoro Verdugo	3,300 acres (13.4 km^{2})	Member of the Verdugo family. Teodoro was Julio's son.
Prudent Beaudry	1,702 acres (6.9 km^{2})	
Rafaela Verdugo de Sepulveda	909 acres (3.7 km^{2})	Member of the Verdugo family. Rafaela was Julio's daughter and was married to Fernando Sepulveda
Captain C. E. Thom	724 acres (2.9 km^{2})	Founder of Glendale, CA
Julio Verdugo	200 acres (0.8 km^{2})	Member of the Verdugo family.
Maria Sepulveda de Sanchez	100 acres (0.4 km^{2})	Member of the Verdugo family. Maria Sepulveda (stepdaughter of Rafaela, and daughter of Fernando Sepulveda and Maria Josefa Dominguez) was married to Los Angeles County Sheriff 1860–1867, Tomas Avila Sanchez.
Jesse D Hunter		Hunter came to California in 1847 with the Mormon Battalion. In 1854 he bought Rancho Cañada de los Nogales and in 1859, the southern tip of Rancho San Rafael.
Ozro W Childs		

== Historic sites of the Rancho ==
- Casa Adobe De San Rafael: An 1865 hacienda-type adobe built by Tomas Avila Sanchez and Maria Sepulveda.
- Catalina Verdugo Adobe: An 1860 adobe built by Catalina's nephew, Teodoro Verdugo. The property is the location of the Oak of Peace, where early Californio leaders, including Andres Pico, met in 1847 and decided to surrender to Lieutenant Colonel John C. Frémont.

== See also ==
- Ranchos of California
- List of Ranchos of California
- Ranchos of Los Angeles County
