= José María Verdugo =

Spanish Californian (1751–1831)

- Born: José María Verdugo Carrillo c. 1751; Presidio de Loreto, Baja California, New Spain
- Died: 1831 (aged 79–80); San Gabriel, California
- Occupations: Explorer and soldier from the Presidio of San Diego

José María Verdugo (c. 1751 – 1831) was a Californio soldier from the Presidio of San Diego who was assigned to the Mission San Gabriel Arcángel at the time his land was granted by the Spanish Empire in 1784.

== Biography ==
José María Verdugo Carrillo was born about 1751 in Presidio de Loreto, Baja California, New Spain to Juan Diego Verdugo and María Ygnacia de la Concepción Carrillo. José María Verdugo came to California with his brother, Mariano Verdugo, in the 1769 Rivera expedition. Verdugo married María de la Encarnación López in 1779, and they had 11 children.

In 1784, Verdugo requested and received a grant from his army commander Governor Pedro Fages to settle and graze his cattle on what became Rancho San Rafael, also known as La Zanja. Corporal Verdugo's grant consisted of eight square leagues (36,402 acres (147.31 km^{2})) of land stretching roughly from the Arroyo Seco in present-day Pasadena to the Mission San Fernando. In 1798 he retired from the army to become a full-time rancher, and title to his property was established by Spanish Governor Diego de Borica.

After a long illness, Verdugo died on 13 April 1831, at Mission San Gabriel, leaving his property to his son Julio Antonio Verdugo and daughter María Catalina Verdugo. He was buried at the cemetery at Mission San Gabriel Arcángel.

== Relatives ==
Julio Antonio Verdugo (1789 - 1876), son of José María Verdugo, married María de Jesus Romero, and had the following children: Teodoro, Chrisóstimo, Fernando, Pedro, José María, Querino/Quirino, Rafael, Guillermo, Vittorio, Rafaela (first married to Fernando Sepúlveda then to Tomás Ávila Sánchez), and Maria Antonia (Señora Chabolla).

María Catalina Verdugo (1792–1871), the blind unmarried daughter of José María Verdugo, lived at the Catalina Adobe with Julio Verdugo's son, Teodoro's family.

American actress Elena Verdugo is one of José María Verdugo's descendants.

== Namesakes ==
- Verdugo Mountains
- Verdugo City, California
- Verdugo Park
