= Yousefian =

Yousefian is a surname. Notable people with the surname include:

- Bob Yousefian (1957–), American politician
- Boghos Yousefian (1775–1844), Armenian merchant in Egypt
