= Larry Zarian =

Armenian-American businessman (1937–2011)

Mayor of Glendale, California
- In office April 1997 – April 1998
- Preceded by: Sheldon S. Baker
- Succeeded by: Eileen Givens
- In office April 1993 – April 1994
- Preceded by: Carl Raggio
- Succeeded by: Eileen Givens
- In office April 1990 – April 1991
- Preceded by: Jerold F. Milner
- Succeeded by: V. W. Bremberg
- In office April 1986 – April 1987
- Preceded by: Jerold F. Milner
- Succeeded by: V. W. Bremberg

Personal details
- Born: October 20, 1937 Tehran, Iran
- Died: October 13, 2011 (aged 73) Glendale, California, U.S.
- Children: 3
- Occupation: Businessman, real estate investor, politician
- Known for: First Armenian-American in Glendale city council

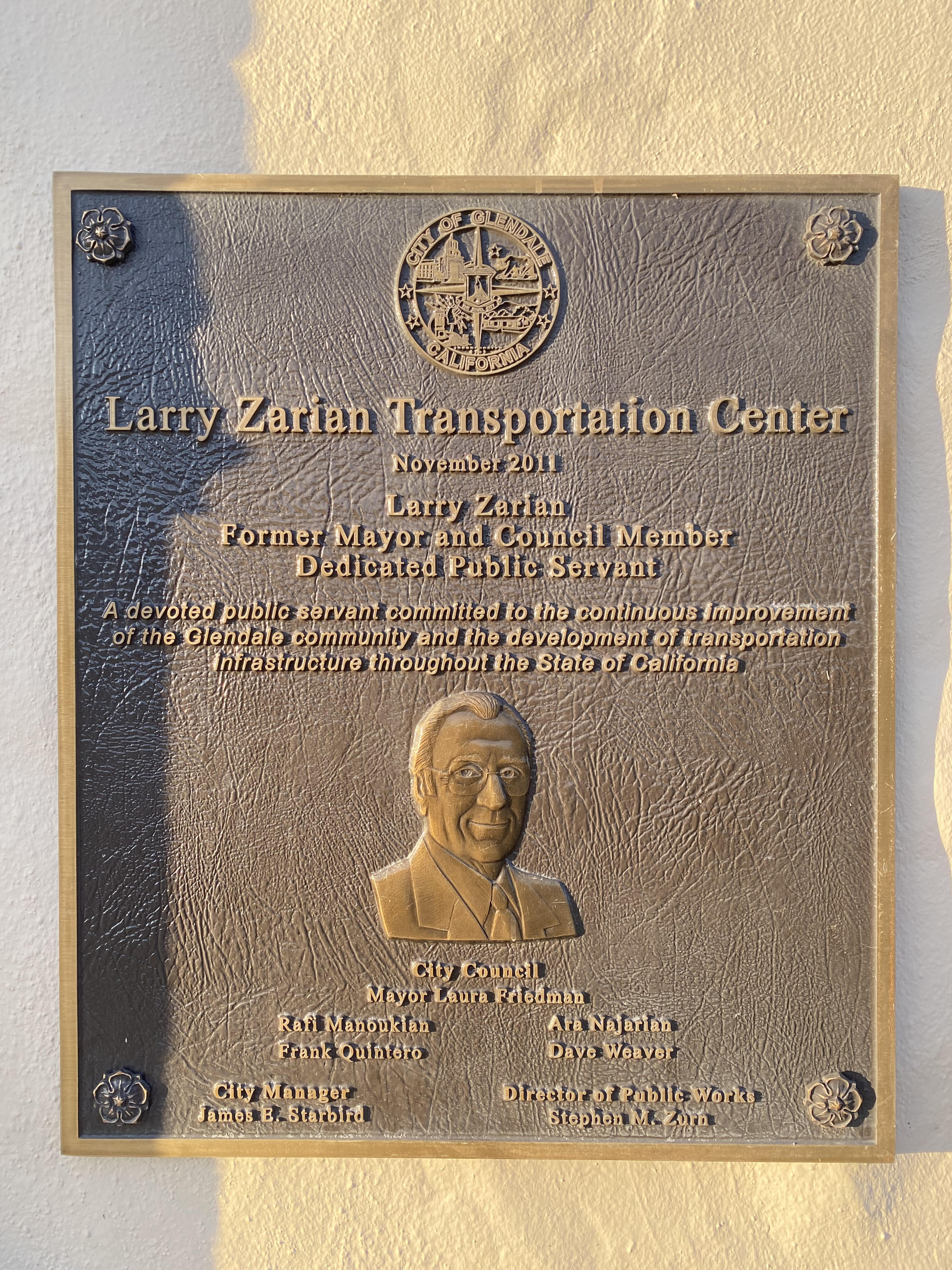
The Larry Zarian Transportation Center dedication plaque

Larry Zarian (Armenian: Լարի Զարյան, October 20, 1937 – October 13, 2011) was an Armenian-American businessman, real estate investor, and a politician from California. Zarian is the first Armenian-American to serve on the Glendale City Council in the City of Glendale, California. Zarian served four terms as mayor of Glendale, California.

== Early life ==
On October 20, 1937, Zarian was born in Tehran, Iran. Zarian's sister is Rima. Zarian attended high school in Massachusetts.

== Education ==
Zarian attended Glendale Community College. Zarian earned a bachelor's degree in political science from UCLA.

== Career ==
As a businessman, Zarian was the owner of Anthony's department stores and a real estate investor.

In 1983, Zarian was elected as a member of city council in Glendale, California. Zarian was the first Armenian-American elected in the Glendale city council.

In April 1986, Zarian became mayor of Glendale, California., and was mayor again in 1990, 1993, and 1997.

In 1995, Zarian became chair of Los Angeles County Metropolitan Transportation Authority's board of directors, where he was a forceful advocate for a Los Angeles Metro Rail line from Los Angeles to Burbank via Glendale.

He served on the California Transportation Commission, and had a show on an Armenian Channel called "AMGA TV". He had a radio show in Los Angeles on KIEV.

== Awards ==
- 1998 Recognized with plaque. Presented by Armenian Society of Los Angeles.
- 2010 Leadership Award. Presented by Armenian National Committee of Glendale.

== Personal life ==
Zarian had three sons, Gregory, Lawrence, and Vincent.

On October 13, 2011, Zarian died from multiple myeloma cancer in Glendale Adventist Medical Center in Glendale, California. Zarian was 73 years old.

== Legacy ==
In November 2011, the Glendale Transportation Center was renamed to the Larry Zarian Transportation Center in honor of his transit advocacy.

== See also ==
- History of the Armenian Americans in Los Angeles
