= Glendale Life =

- Genre: Reality
- Starring: Current; Anna Victoria "AV" DerParseghian (Season 1-2); Lucy Samuelian (Season 1-2); Veha Tarious (Season 1-2); Arabo Sarkisian (Season 1-); Arman Mardigian (Season 1-); Lola Sarkisyan (Season 1-); Edgar Rostomyan (Season 1-); Nadia Hovhannisyan (Season 1-)
- Country of origin: United States
- Original languages: English; Armenian
- No. of seasons: 2
- No. of episodes: 75

Production
- Camera setup: Multiple
- Running time: 25 to 45 minutes
- Production company: USArmenia TV

Original release
- Network: USArmenia TV
- Release: September 15, 2014 – 2015

Glendale Life is an Armenian-American reality television series that aired on USArmenia TV. The series follows a group of Armenian friends living in Glendale, California and the surrounding communities of Los Angeles. The first season starred Anna Victoria "AV" DerParseghian, Lucy Samuelian, Veha Tarious, Arabo (Elcid) Sarkisian, Arman Mardigian, Lola Sarkisyan, Edgar Rostomyan, and Nadia (Nadejda) Hovhannisyan. The show received some backlash from members of the Armenian community for allegedly stereotyping.

Season one premiered on September 15, 2014, and ended on December 29, with the 2 reunion episodes airing on December 30, and 31, respectively. Season two premiered on March 2, 2015, and returned with AV Anna Victoria, Lucy and Veha. The departing Arabo, Arman, Edgar, Lola and Nadia were replaced by cast members Lousine Pogosian and Shprot "Ani" Tovmasyan. Beginning in episode 13, Shprot was mysteriously removed from the show and replaced with recurring stars, Luna Vagarshakian and Jacqueline Nerguizian.

USArmenia TV, the channel on which the series airs.

== Cast history ==
Cast	Seasons	
Cast	1	2
	Current main	
Anna Victoria "AV" DerParseghian	Main	Main
Lucy Samuelian	Main	Main
Veha Tarious	Main	Main
Lousine Pogosian		Main
Luna Vagarshakian		Main
Jacqueline Nerguizian		Main
	Former main	
Nadia Hovhannisyan	Main	Guest
Arabo Sarkisian	Main	Guest
Lola Sarkisyan	Main	
Arman Mardigian	Main	
Edgar Rostomyan	Main	
Shprot Tovmasyan		Main
	Friends	
Khatchig Arabian	Friend	Friend
Azature Pogosian	Friend	
Andraniq Pogosian	Friend	

== See also ==
- History of the Armenian Americans in Los Angeles
- Television in Armenia
- Shahs of Sunset, an Iranian-American reality television series with a similar concept, which has received backlash from the Iranian community for stereotyping
