= Rafi Manoukian =

American politician

Mayor of Glendale, California
- In office April 2005 – April 2006
- Preceded by: Bob Yousefian
- Succeeded by: Dave Weaver

Personal details
- Born: 1961 (age 64–65) Beirut, Lebanon
- Party: Democratic
- Education: Miami Dade Community College

Rafi Manoukian (born 1961) is a businessman and elected council member for several terms to the Glendale City Council, and has served at times as mayor of the city.

== Biography ==
Manoukian immigrated to the United States in 1975 from Beirut, Lebanon with his parents and three brothers. He resided in Los Angeles. After high school, he joined the United States Air Force in 1978 at the age 17 where he was promoted to the rank of Sergeant and where he received the Air Force Commendation Medal for work above and beyond the call of duty. He was honorably discharged in 1982.

During his four years in the military, Manoukian received an Associate in Arts Degree from Miami Dade Community College. Afterwards, Manoukian continued his education at California State University, Northridge receiving a bachelor's degree in economics in 1984. He received his Certified Public Accountant certificate in 1991 and founded Manoukian Accountancy Corporation in 1993. He went on to receive an MBA from California State University, Dominguez Hills in 2004. Manoukian married Zovig Sepetjian in 1987, and they have three children.

From 1997 to 1998, Manoukian served on the Measure K School Bond Committee, a role for which he earned the Glendale Unified School District Burtis E. Taylor Education Award. From 1998 to 1999, Manoukian served on the Board of the Glendale Chamber of Commerce as well as on the Board of the Glendale Youth Alliance.

In April 1999, Manoukian was elected to the Glendale City Council after promoting the registration of over 4000 new voters. He was re-elected in 2003, attaining the most votes of any council candidate up to that point in time. In addition to his duties as a councilmember, Manoukian served as Chair of the Housing Authority and the Redevelopment Agency. He assumed the duties of Glendale mayor in 2002-03 and 2005–06. As mayor, he chaired the 2005 Relay for Life event, which raised over $100,000 for cancer research. Manoukian was voted by the community as Best Politician in 2005. Manoukian was honored in 2006 by the National Ethnic Coalition of Organizations Foundation, by being awarded the Ellis Island Medal of Honor, which is given to immigrants that have made outstanding contributions to the United States. Although Glendale's City Council is non-partisan, Manoukian is a member of the Democratic Party. Manoukian also sits on the Burbank-Glendale-Pasadena Airport Commission.

In January 2011, Manoukian announced his candidacy for Glendale City Council. He won the election and was sworn in as a Glendale City Councilmember in April 2011.

Manoukian currently serves as Glendale's city treasurer.

== See also ==
- History of the Armenian Americans in Los Angeles
