= Eileen Givens =

Mayor of Glendale, California
- In office April 1994 – April 1995
- Preceded by: Larry Zarian
- Succeeded by: Richard M. Reyes

Mayor of Glendale, California
- In office April 1998 – April 1999
- Preceded by: Larry Zarian
- Succeeded by: V. W. "Ginger" Bremberg

Personal details
- Spouse: Jim Givens
- Relatives: Douglas McKay (grandfather)
- Occupation: Politician

Eileen Givens is a former American politician from California. Givens is a former mayor of Glendale, California.

== Early life ==
Givens was born as Eileen Hadley. Givens' father was Wayne E. Hadley. Givens' mother was Shirley McKay Hadley (1923-2012).

Givens' maternal grandfather was Douglas McKay, former Oregon governor and U.S. interior secretary.

== Career ==
In April 1994, Givens became the mayor of Glendale, California, until April 1995.

On April 4, 1995, Givens won the election and continued serving as a member of city council for Glendale, California. Givens received 39.69% of the votes.

In April 1998, Givens became the mayor of Glendale, California, until April 1999.

Givens is the author of I Baked a Cake for Ike and Mamie!, a memoir of her grandfather Douglas McKay.

== Personal life ==
Givens' husband is Jim Givens. Givens and her family lives in McMinnville, Oregon.
