= History of Armenian Americans in Los Angeles =

Largest population of Armenians in the world outside of Armenia

The Los Angeles metropolitan area has a significant Armenian American population. As of 1990, this single area holds the largest Armenian American community in the United States as well as the largest population of Armenians in the world outside Armenia.

Anny P. Bakalian, the author of Armenian-Americans: From Being to Feeling Armenian, wrote that "Los Angeles has become a sort of Mecca for traditional Armenianness." Since 1965 and as of 1993, the majority of immigration of ethnic Armenians from Iran or the former Soviet Union have gone to the Los Angeles area. Armenians in Los Angeles are plentiful and make up a large part of the local Middle Eastern population.

== History ==
=== Early and mid 20th Century ===
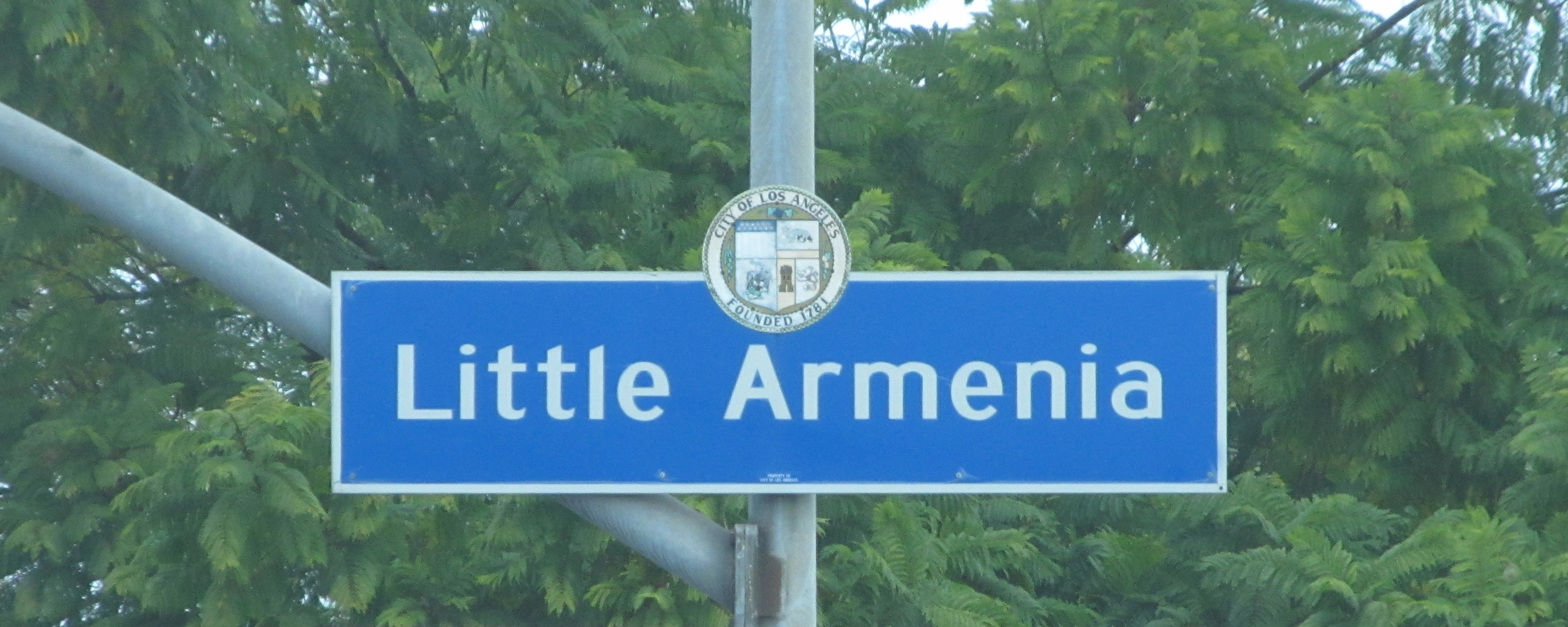
Little Armenia Neighborhood Sign in Los Angeles

The first Armenian families began to settle in the Los Angeles area starting in the late 19th century. Aram Yeretzian, a social worker and Protestant Christian minister who wrote a 1923 University of Southern California thesis on the Armenians of Los Angeles, stated that the first Armenian in Los Angeles arrived around 1900. According to Yeretzian, the first Armenian was a student who left the East Coast due to health concerns. Yeretzian stated that the second Armenian was a vendor of Oriental rugs.

The first significant wave of Armenian immigration occurred from western Armenia, due to the Armenian genocide during the violent disruption and break-up of the Ottoman Empire. Most of the early Armenian settlers in Los Angeles were from Western Armenia- a territory located in modern-day eastern Turkey. Circa 1923 there were an estimated 2,500 to 3,000 Armenians in the city. By the mid-1920s more Armenians were settling in the Pasadena area. In 1924 the Varoujan Club was founded by 20 young Armenians to organize Armenian cultural and social events. During this period, the Armenian General Benevolent Union (AGBU) and the Compatriotic Reconstruction Union of Hadjin were founded. By 1933 there were 120 Armenian families in Pasadena. Nearly all of these immigrants were from the Ottoman Empire; very few were from the Russian Empire. The Pasadena Armenians settled in the area of Allen Avenue and Washington Boulevard, near the Church of the Nazarene, which was used by the Protestant Armenians.

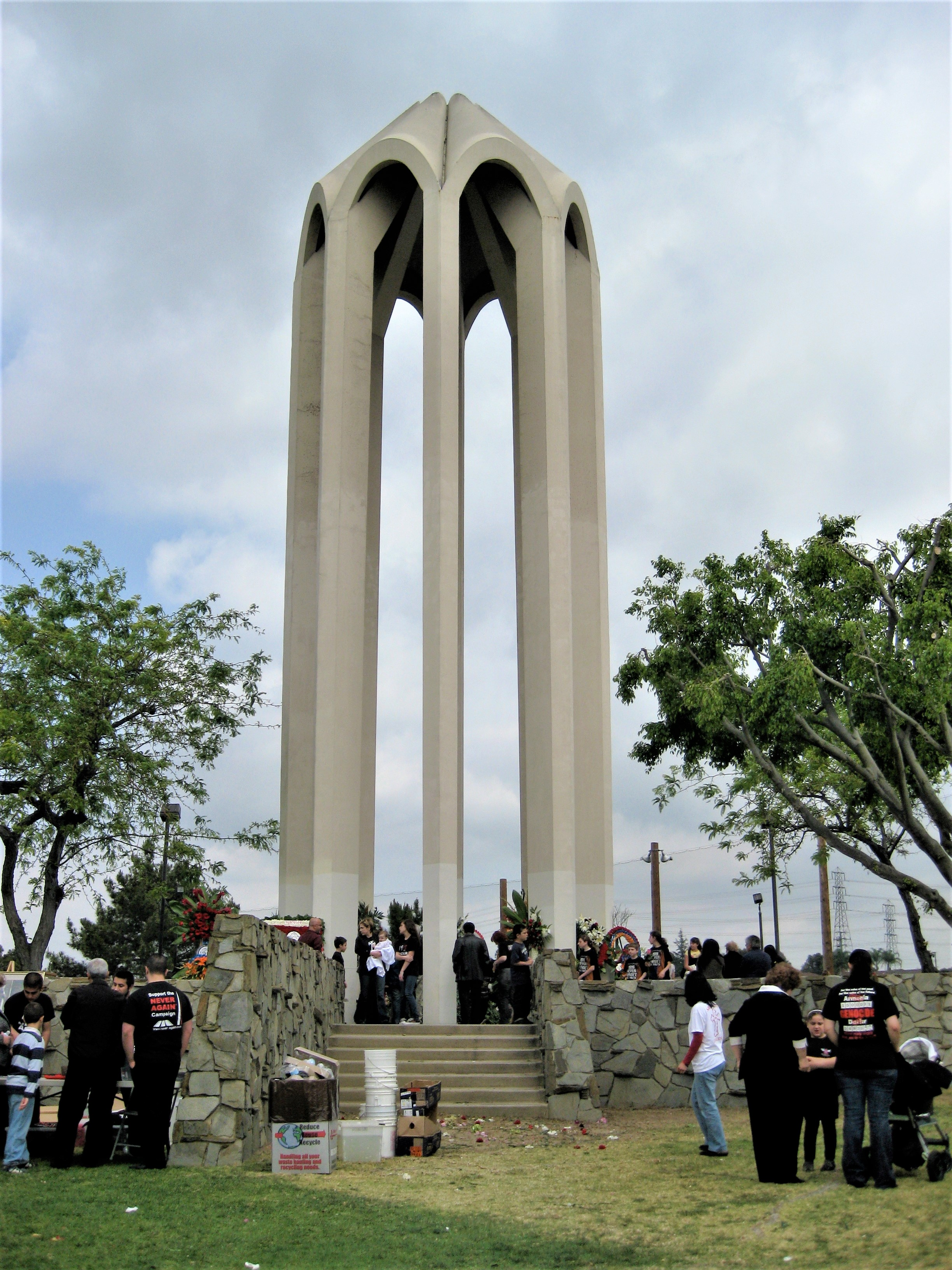
Armenian Genocide Martyrs Monument, opened in 1968

Another wave of immigration to Los Angeles occurred in the 1940s. Most Armenians then settled in Little Armenia in Hollywood. The Armenian Genocide Martyrs Monument opened in Montebello in 1968.

=== Late 20th century ===
The Lebanese Civil War beginning in 1975 resulted in the increased immigration of Lebanese Armenians to Los Angeles. Other political conflicts around the same time were catalysts for Iranian Armenians and Egyptian Armenians to settle in Los Angeles as well. Armenians from Fresno and the East Coast also moved to Los Angeles because of the large community there.

Approximately 9,500 Armenians came to the United States in 1979 and 1980, and most settled in Hollywood. In August 1987, as part of glasnost, the Soviet Union began approval of exit visas for Armenians wishing to emigrate to the United States to reunite with relatives. As a result, from October 1987 through March 1988, 2,000 Armenians arrived in Los Angeles County. That March, county officials were expecting an additional 8,000 Armenians to arrive. The county officials stated that the expected immigration of 10,000 Armenians from the Soviet Union was the single largest arrival of an ethnic group after the late 1970s Vietnamese immigration. Some Los Angeles-area Armenian leaders believed that increased settlement in the United States would dilute the Armenian presence in the Soviet Union and area around Armenia, and therefore felt ambivalence. This wave of immigration eventually established Little Armenia in Hollywood.

In 1988, up to 3,000 Iranian Armenians were scheduled to arrive in the Los Angeles area. From 1987 to 1989, 90% of Armenians leaving the Soviet Union settled in Los Angeles. By the 1990s political conflict in the former Soviet Union caused more Armenians in that area to move to Los Angeles.

In 1993, Anny Bakalian, author of Armenian-Americans: From Being to Feeling Armenian, wrote that many poorer Armenians, especially low income refugees from the former Soviet Union and the Middle East who arrived in the 1980s, had been forced to take an Armenian identity. He argued that many of the poor are not familiar with American customs and are uneducated, this therefore "risks increasing prejudice and discrimination against group members." Bakalian stated her belief that "Los Angeles is not representative of Armenian-Americans or the Armenian-American community." By 1996, longtime Anglo residents, largely fueled by anti-Armenian sentiment, decried the increased density in South Glendale.

=== 21st Century ===
In 2010, Kobe Bryant of the Los Angeles Lakers signed a two-year endorsement with Turkish Airlines. Because the company is owned by the Turkish government, which Armenians hold responsible for not acknowledging the 1915 genocide, Armenians in the Los Angeles area and US protested, asking him to give up the contract.

By 2014, the Los Angeles area had received additional Armenian refugees from Egypt and Syria. The ongoing Syrian civil war is responsible for the recent wave in refugee arrival.

The 2015 Armenian March for Justice saw over 130,000 people march from the Little Armenia neighborhood of Hollywood to the Turkish Consulate of Los Angeles to demand recognition and justice for the Armenian Genocide on the centennial anniversary of the tragedy.

An Armenian Genocide memorial opened in Grand Park in September 2016.

== Geographic distribution ==
The strip encompassing East Hollywood, Glendale, Burbank and Pasadena is a major concentration point as is Montebello, according to the 1980 United States census; as of that census, Armenians in the areas together made up 90% of Armenians in Los Angeles County. Together, Armenians have created one of the largest sub ethnicities in the United States within Los Angeles. As of 1991 the established Armenian communities in the area included Encino and Hollywood in Los Angeles as well as the cities of Montebello and Pasadena. The Burbank/Glendale settlement is newer.

The Little Armenia in Hollywood historically had Armenians from Armenia. In 1980, Armenians in East Hollywood made up 56% of Armenians in Los Angeles County. In 1988, Mark Arax and Esther Schrader wrote that Hollywood "has become something of a port of entry for the Soviet refugees." In 1989 Vered Amit Talai wrote that "the Soviet Armenian emigrants form a very visible community in Hollywood". In 1988 the Los Angeles-area chairperson of the Hunchak Party, Harry Diramarian, stated "'Going to Hollywood, going to Hollywood.' You hear it all the time on the streets of Yerevan." In 1988, Little Armenia, had many Armenian residents operating bakeries and living in apartments above the businesses. Zankou Chicken had opened in Hollywood in 1984. In 1989 Talai wrote that Armenians in Hollywood had a negative effect on the Armenian reputation in California because they were "visible" and "indigent" but that the indigent status is "unusual" relative to the overall Armenian diaspora.

In the 1980 U.S. Census, Armenians in Glendale comprised 25% of Armenians in Los Angeles County. In the Glendale Unified School District, by 1988 Armenians along with students from the Middle East had become the largest ethnic group in the public schools, having a larger number than the Latinos. Alice Petrossian, the GUSD director of intercultural education, stated that Burbank lies within the middle of other Armenian communities, so it attracted more Armenians. Levon Marashlian, an Armenian history teacher at Glendale Community College, stated that Glendale's Armenian population became larger than Hollywood's by the early 1990s. As the 2000 U.S. census, 30% of the residents of Glendale were Armenian. By 2000 Glendale had the largest Armenian population outside of Yerevan.

Historically many U.S.-born Armenians settled Montebello and Pasadena. In 1980, Armenians in Pasadena were 9% of the county's total number of Armenians. By 1989, the makeup of the Armenian community in Pasadena had changed: of Armenians in Pasadena, 33% were born in Lebanon, 17% were U.S.-born, 16% were born in Armenia, 12% were born in Syria, and the remainder were born in other places. The city government had gathered the data through a special census.

By 1988 many Armenians were moving from Hollywood to suburban Glendale, Burbank, and other areas. By that time, some immigrants settled directly in Glendale and Burbank. Historically many of the Glendale Armenians were from Iran.

On October 6, 2000, the community in East Hollywood was named Little Armenia by the Los Angeles City Council. The city council noted that "the area contains a high concentration of Armenian businesses and residents and social and cultural institutions including schools, churches, social and athletic organizations."

== Culture ==
The Armenian American Museum is under construction in Glendale. The nearly 60,000-square-foot museum was designed by Glendale's Alajajian-Marcoosi Architects. The heavily engraved facade simultaneously references both Mount Ararat, as well as the Verdugo Mountains surrounding the city of Glendale. The two-story museum will include an indoor auditorium and a demonstration kitchen.

=== Religion ===
Armenian Apostolicism

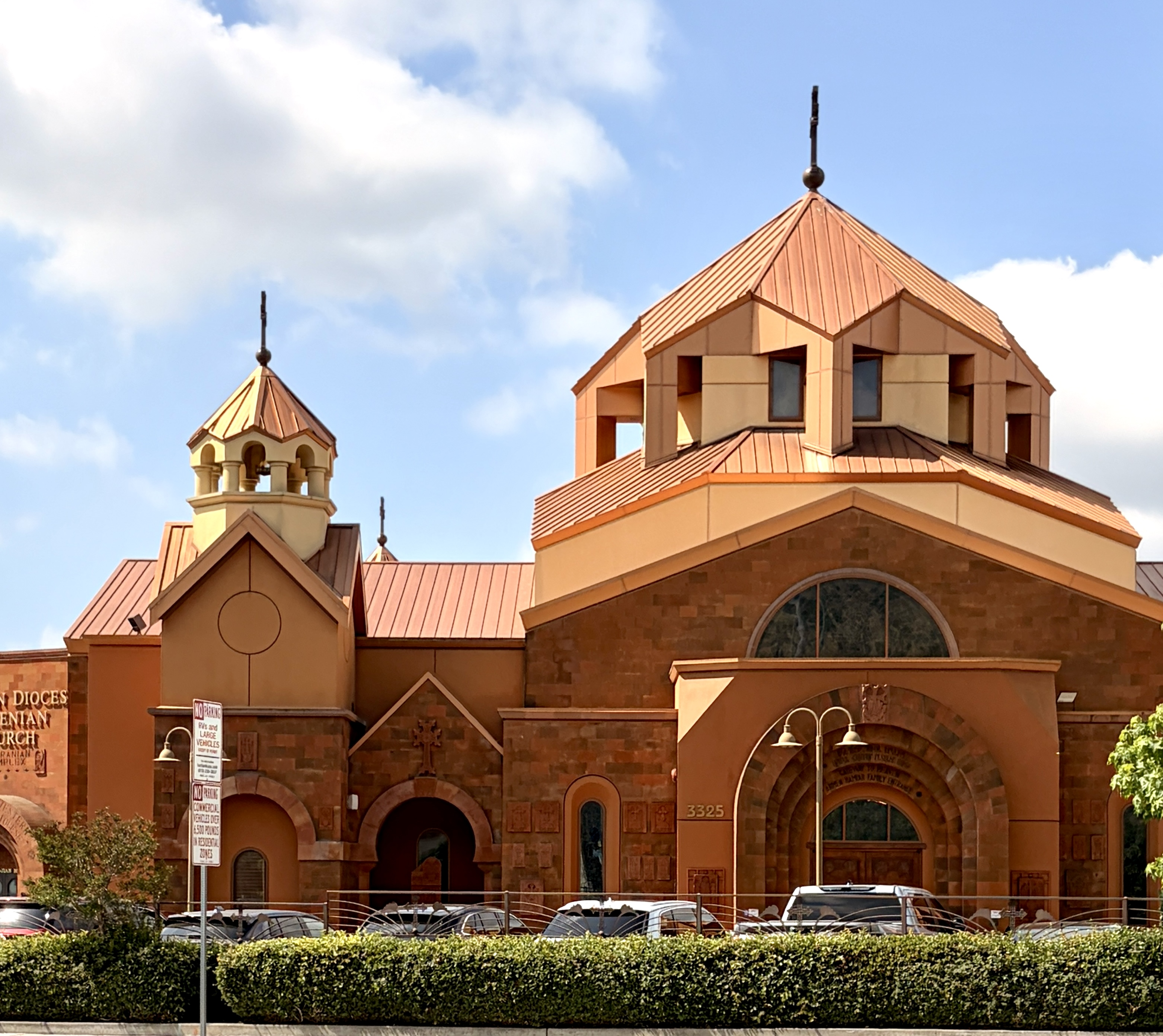
St. Leon Cathedral

In 1994, Karekin II, Catholicos of the Holy See of Cilicia, visited Los Angeles. At the time, an estimated 300,000 Armenians in Southern California were associated with either wing of the Armenian Apostolic Church.

In 2005, both Karekin II, Catholicos of the Mother See of Holy Etchmiadzin and Aram I, Catholicos of the Holy See of Cilicia, visited Los Angeles. In an interview, Aram II stated that although he hoped for greater collaboration between the two sees, he believed the existence of two Catholicosates has turned out to be a blessing. "Two-headed eagle is stronger," he said, pointing to a gold seal with a double-headed eagle on a gold chain around his neck.

Catholicism

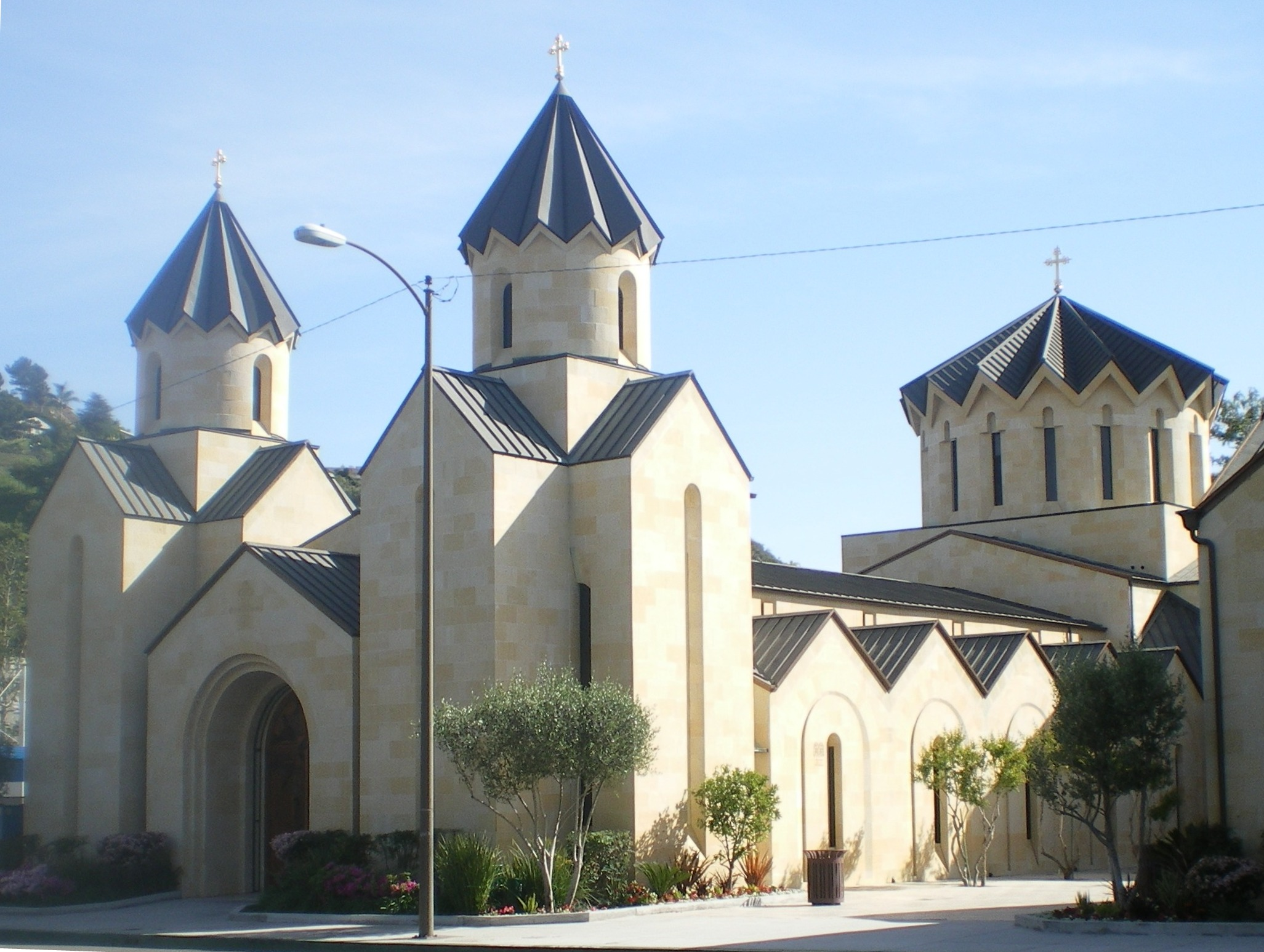
St. Gregory the Illuminator Cathedral

In 1951, Cardinal Gregorio Pietro Agagianian, the Patriarch of Cilicia, was invited to visit Los Angeles by Cardinal James Francis McIntyre, the Archbishop of Los Angeles. That same year, Mekhitarist priest Michael Akian arrived in Los Angeles to assist with establishing a local Armenian parish. Founded in Boyle Heights in 1952, Our Lady Queen of Martyrs became the center of Catholic Armenian life in Los Angeles, but most of its parishioners have since died or moved to more affluent neighborhoods. Since 2001, the church's prominence has been overshadowed by St. Gregory the Illuminator Cathedral in Glendale.

== Demographics ==
The Armenian population is subdivided according to their countries of birth, where groups had developed distinctly different cultures. In addition to those born in Armenia, these include those born in the United States, Iranian Armenians, Lebanese Armenians, and Turkish Armenians, as well as those from elsewhere in the former Soviet Union and the Middle East.

Aram Yeretzian's 1923 University of Southern California study found that there were around 2,500 to 3,000 Armenians in the city of Los Angeles. 12 Armenian men had married women from several backgrounds including American and Spanish, and three Armenian women had married American men. At the time the majority of Armenians were Turkish Armenians while some came from what was Russia at the time. The main push factor for Armenians was the Armenian genocide—however, most Armenians ended up dispersed in countries such as Iran, Syria, Lebanon and Egypt.

With turbulent situations in Lebanon, Egypt and Iran during the 1970s, many Armenians came to the U.S. via family reunification channels.

Immigration had been heavy in the 1970s. As of 1980 about 66% of Armenian immigrants overall, 70% of immigrants from the former Soviet Union, Iran, and Lebanon, and 60% of Armenians from Turkey, had arrived between 1975 and 1980.

As of 1980 the median age of U.S.-born Armenians in Los Angeles was 25. The median age for Turkish Armenians was 64; they had resided in the U.S. the longest. The median ages for other Armenians born outside of the U.S. ranged from 26 to 36.

By the 1980 United States census, there were 52,400 Armenians in Los Angeles. Citing a 1988 work by Lieberson and Waters, Bakalian wrote, "scholars find that these statistics from the 1980 census underestimate the actual number of Armenians in Los Angeles, and elsewhere in the U.S. for that matter". Of these Armenians, foreign-born made up more than twice the number of native-born: 14,700 were born in the United States and 37,700 were born outside of the United States. Of those born in the U.S., 10,200 were born in California and 4,500 were born elsewhere. Of those born outside of the U.S., 7,700 came from Iran, 7,500 from the former Soviet Union, 6,000 from Lebanon, 5,100 from Turkey, 6,200 from elsewhere in the Middle East, and 5,200 from other countries.

As of the 1990 U.S. census, there were 115,000 Armenians in the Los Angeles region, making up 37% of the total number of Armenians in the country.

== Politics ==
=== Early history ===
In 1962, Republican George Deukmejian was elected to represent 39th Assembly District in Long Beach, where he was a high-profile advocate for capital punishment. In 1966, he was elected to the California State Senate, becoming majority leader in 1969. He was elected Attorney General of California in 1979 and led a high-profile campaign against cannabis in northern California, which later became the Campaign Against Marijuana Planting.

In 1966, Walter J. Karabian was elected to the State Assembly in 1966 as a representative for the 45th Assembly District in the San Gabriel Valley. Karabian represented the 45th District for the next eight years, continually winning reelection to the State Assembly. As a Democratic leader, Karabian mentored many future members of the Assembly, including Richard Alatorre and Art Torres. Considering himself to be a progressive, Karabian authored bills that dealt with prison reform, education, civil rights, free speech, and the preservation of endangered species in California.

=== Modern history ===
==== Governorship and first municipal wins ====
Long Beach's George Deukmejian was elected Governor of California in 1982 on a "law and order" platform. In this role, he ousted several California Supreme Court justices and appointed hundreds of judges to the state’s lower courts. He lobbied in 1982 for the appointment of Robert Philibosian as the Los Angeles County District Attorney.

In 1983, Larry Zarian became the first Armenian elected to the Glendale City Council, where he served for 16 years. He also served as a boardmember for the Los Angeles County Metropolitan Transportation Authority, where he was a forceful advocate for a Los Angeles Metro Rail line to connect Los Angeles and Glendale.

In 1995, Bill Paparian was elected as Pasadena's first Armenian city council member. While serving as mayor of Pasadena, he convened a conference on the future of U.S.-Cuba relations at Occidental College and traveled to Cuba to urge that the American embargo against Cuba be lifted.

In 1999, Larry Zarian stepped down from the Glendale City Council and Rafi Manoukian was sworn in.

==== Consolidation of power in Glendale ====
In 2005, the Glendale City Council became Armenian-majority for the first time, with Ara Najarian, Rafi Manoukian and Bob Yousefian holding three of the five seats. At the same time, Ardy Kassakhian was elected as the city's first Armenian city clerk.

In 2006, Paul Krekorian was elected to the 43rd district of the State Assembly. In 2009, he won a seat on the Los Angeles City Council, representing Los Angeles City Council District 2, thereby becoming the first Armenian elected to office in the city of Los Angeles.

In 2011, two cities elected their first Armenian city council members: Jack Hadjinian in Montebello and Marina Khubesrian in South Pasadena

In 2012, Krekorian's former chief of staff, Adrin Nazarian, was elected to the 46th district of the State Assembly, where he focused on issues such as healthcare, public transit and education. Also that year, the city of Sierra Madre elected John Harabedian as its first Armenian city council member.

==== Increased homeland–diaspora ties ====
In 2013, Zareh Sinanyan became the first Armenia-born individual elected to the Glendale City Council.

By 2017, Glendale had Armenian majorities on the City Council, the Board of Education and the College District, as well as an Armenian city clerk and treasurer.

Following the 2018 Armenian Revolution, Zareh Sinanyan was appointed as Armenia's High Commissioner for Diaspora Affairs, signifying a new phase in Armenia's diaspora policy.

In 2022, Armenia-born Elen Asatryan became the first Armenian woman to be elected to the Glendale City Council, and in 2024 became the first Armenian woman to serve as the city's mayor. Later that year, Krekorian was elected the president of the Los Angeles City Council following the resignation of former council president Nury Martinez.

Adrin Nazarian was elected to the Los Angeles City Council in 2024, replacing the term-limited Paul Krekorian on the Los Angeles City Council. That same year, John Harabedian was elected to represent California's 41st State Assembly district.

In 2026, Alek Bartrosouf became the county's first openly-LGBT+ elected official of Armenian descent when he was elected to the Glendale City Council.

== Economy ==
Armenians in Los Angeles consist of a large group of entrepreneurs. As of 1996, the self-employment rate of Armenian managers and professionals in Los Angeles is over 66%.

As of 1980, of the total number of Armenian men 16 and older, 25% worked as executives and professionals. Of the same total, 44% were craftsmen and operators. As of that year, 32% of U.S.-born Armenian and Iranian-born Armenian men worked as executives and professionals, and about 33% of the same group worked as craftsmen and operators. As of the same year, 15% of Armenian men from Armenia worked as executives and professionals, and about 66% of the same group worked as craftsmen and operators.

The 1980 self-employment rate of Armenians in total was 18%. Of the Turkish Armenians the rate was 32%. The other Armenian groups had self-employment rates close to 18%. Armenia-born Armenians had an 11% self-employment rate. Der-Martirosian, Sabagh, and Bozorgmehr wrote that the Armenia-born Armenians were less likely to start their own businesses compared to other groups because "the tradition of entrepreneurship may not have been as strong in the Soviet socialist economy as it remained in Middle Eastern market economies." In addition, this group had arrived with no or very little capital and the members were not permitted to take money out of the former Soviet Union. The 1980 percentage of general employment of the general Los Angeles population was 9%.

According to Yeretzian's 1923 study, 39.5% of Los Angeles Armenians were skilled laborers, 23.5% were agricultural laborers, 2.3% were professionals, and the remainder worked in other occupations as laborers.

== Media ==
As of 2013, Glendale was home to eight Armenian-American television stations and no fewer than ten Armenian-American newspapers.

- Asbarez (Armenian: Ասպարէզ, meaning "Arena") is a bilingual daily newspaper published in Armenian and English in Little Armenia.
- The California Courier has been published in Glendale on a weekly basis since the 1980s.
- Massis Weekly (Armenian: Մասիս Շաբաթաթերթ) is an official publication of the Social Democrat Hunchakian Party of the Western Region of the United States of America, published in Pasadena.
- Nor Hayastan (Armenian: Նոր Հայաստան, meaning "New Armenia") is an independent Armenian language daily newspaper published in Glendale.
- Nor Or (Armenian: Նոր Օր, meaning "New Day") is an independent Armenian language weekly newspaper published in Altadena.

Other notable Armenian media in Los Angeles include:

- Horizon Armenian Television is the first 24-hour Armenian language television network in America.
- In 2012 PanArmenian Media Group created Panarmenian TV for the Armenian American audience.
- In 2014, USArmenia began airing Glendale Life, a reality TV show about Armenians in Glendale. Critics of the show started a Facebook page called "Stop 'Glendale Life' Show" and a change.org petition. In a two-week span, the petition received over 1,600 signatures and the Facebook page got almost 6,000 likes.
- KLOS-HD3 airs Armenian music and is branded as "SoCal Armenian".

== Education ==
Claudia Der-Martirosian, Georges Sabagh, and Mehdi Bozorgmehr, authors of "Subethnicity: Armenians in Los Angeles," wrote that in 1980 "the general level of education among all Armenians in Los Angeles was fairly high." Different subgroups of Armenian immigrants had differing levels of education. As of 1980, almost no U.S.-born Armenian men, and fewer of one out of ten Armenian-born Armenians and Iranian Armenians had low levels of education; these groups had the highest modal education category, with men achieving university degrees and women not having university degrees. Almost half of Turkish Armenian men, who were older compared to other Armenians, had some elementary school education. The modal education category of Turkish Armenians was the lowest, with both men and women having elementary education. Almost one quarter of Lebanese Armenian men and Armenian men from elsewhere in the Middle East had a limited elementary school education. Der-Martirosian, Sabagh, and Bozorgmehr wrote that "Although women, generally, had a lower educational achievement than did men, internal differences among subgroups were comparable to those of the Armenian men." Because of the presence of uneducated Armenians, overall there were fewer Los Angeles Armenians with a postgraduate university education compared to those who had only an elementary level education.

=== Institutions ===
Public institutions

As of 1990, the largest immigrant group speaking an ethnic home language in the Glendale Unified School District was Armenians. In 1987 the district had eight Armenian-speaking teachers and teaching aides, and that year had hired five additional Armenian-speaking teachers and teacher aides. By 2004 over 33% of the Glendale district students were Armenian. That year, due to high levels of student absence around the Armenian Christmas the Glendale district considered making Armenian holidays school holidays. In 2016 it also began having no school on April 24, known as the anniversary of the start of the Armenian genocide (Red Sunday); it was the first American school district to do this.

As of 2010 20% of the students at Grant High School in Valley Glen (Los Angeles USD) were Armenian.

In 2026, Glendale Unified School District approved a language immersion program for Western Armenian, scheduled to be launched for the 2027-2028 school year.

Private institutions

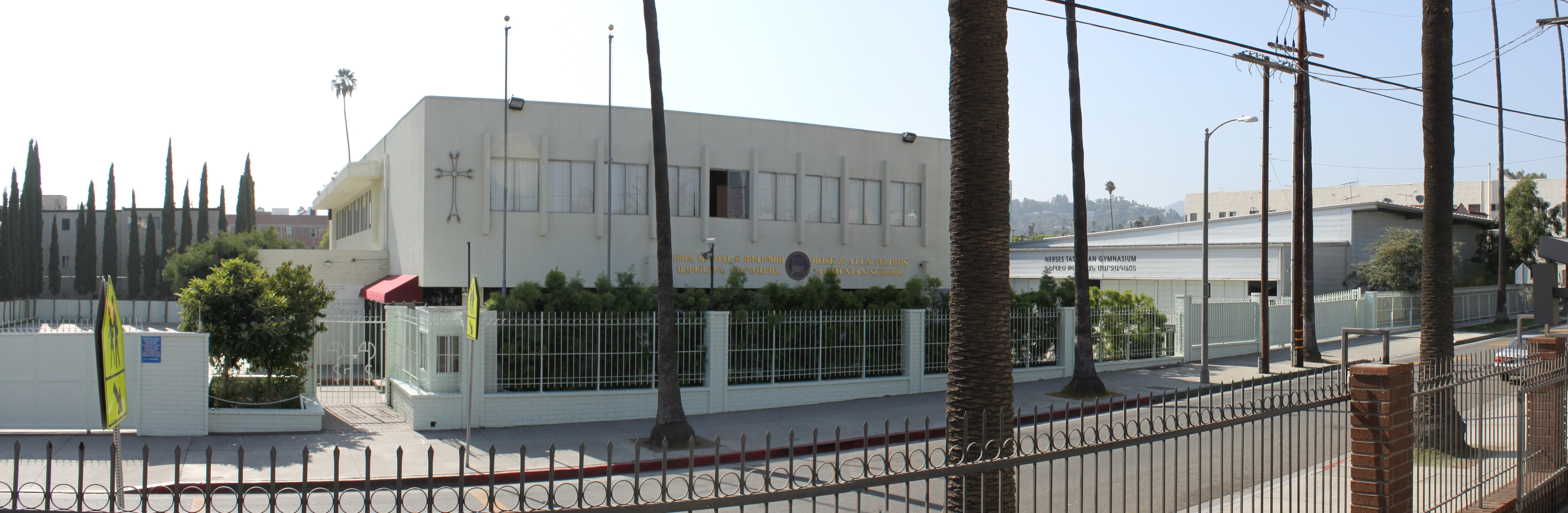
Rose and Alex Pilibos Armenian School

As of 1993 there were twelve Armenian day schools in the Los Angeles area, with five of them being high schools. These Los Angeles-area Armenian day schools are the majority of Armenian day schools in the United States. Ferrahian Armenian School in Encino, Los Angeles in the San Fernando Valley is the first Armenian day school in the United States, opening in 1964.

- The Rose and Alex Pilibos Armenian School is located in Little Armenia in Hollywood.
- Armenian schools in the San Fernando Valley include the AGBU Manoogian-Demirdjian School in Winnetka, the Ferrahian Armenian School in Encino and North Hills.
- The PK-12 Armenian Mesrobian School is located in Pico Rivera, serving the Armenian community east of Downtown Los Angeles.
- Armenian schools in Glendale include the Chamlian Armenian School.

TCA Arshag Dickranian Armenian School closed in 2015. AGBU Vatche and Tamar Manoukian High School in Pasadena closed in 2020.

In June 2021, Adrin Nazarian announced $9 million in state funding to establish a location of TUMO Center for Creative Technologies in the southeast San Fernando Valley. Serj Tankian, a member of TUMO's Advisory Board, has emphasized TUMO Los Angeles' proximity to the American film industry. TUMO Los Angeles opened in 2025.

Post-secondary education

The Mashdots College is located in Glendale. It includes college, career, and certificate programs.

== Relations with other communities ==
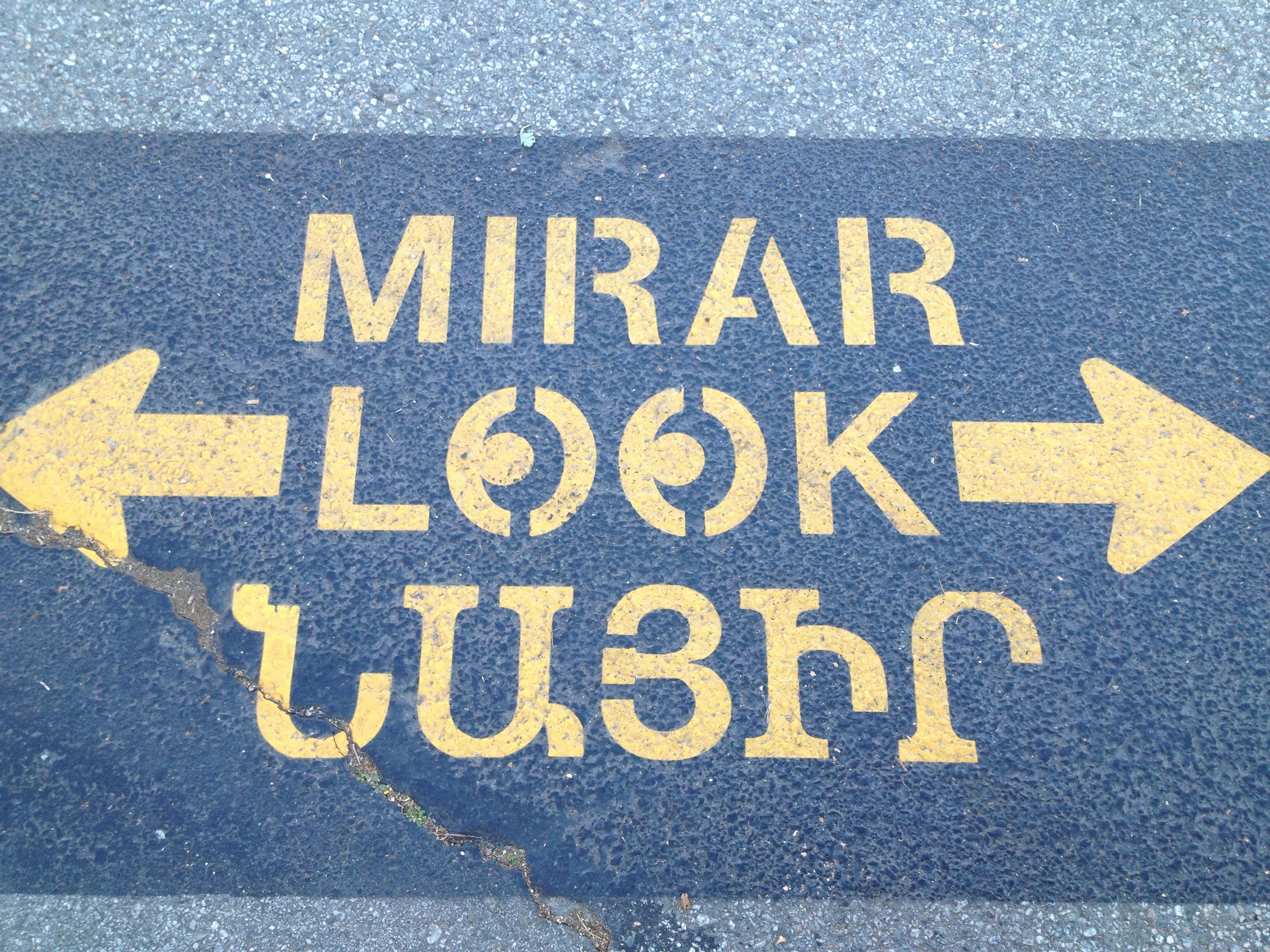
A sign in Spanish, English, and Armenian in Glendale

The emergence of increasingly visible ethnic groups — including Armenians, Cubans and Filipinos and Koreans — changed the official discourse in Glendale. In 1972, C.E. Perkins, then city manager, encouraged the Rotary Club of Glendale to prepare itself as the city, historically a sundown town, could no longer remain isolated in an increasingly diverse America.

During the 1992 Los Angeles uprising, Armenians largely remained on the sidelines and watched the events unfold from their ethnic enclaves. Chahe Keuroghlian of the Glendale Police Department surmised that this isolationism was cultural, stating "We lived in the Ottoman Empire as a minority in forced isolation. In the countries of the Middle East that same seclusion continued. We built community and a whole structure accordingly. Then we moved those substructures to other countries. And because we manage to survive, we think that a sequestered, inward-looking lifestyle has been the backbone of our survival. I don't think that's really justified. The more we cooperate with and learn about other communities, the better it is for everyone."

Armenian immigration altered the ethnic composition of certain neighborhoods, causing backlash. Within a two-month span in 2000, there were three murders and one attempted murder in the Los Angeles area as a result of tensions between Armenians and Latinos.

In January 2019, a masked individual zip-tied Turkish flags on the gates of AGBU Manoogian-Demirdjian School and Holy Martyrs Ferrahian High School, in Canoga Park and Encino, respectively. Authorities investigated the incidents, which sparked concern and outrage among local Armenians.

In November 2020, during the Second Nagorno-Karabakh War, the Mexican community of Glendale erected a Day of the Dead altar in support of the Armenian community.

The 2022 Los Angeles City Council scandal revealed that Los Angeles City Council president Nury Martinez referred to Areen Ibranossian, an advisor to councilmember Paul Krekorian, as "The guy with one eyebrow." With Martinez unable to recall Ibranossian's last name, Gil Cedillo replied "It ends in i-a-n, I bet you." The Armenian National Committee of America denounced this incident.

Individuals protesting the 2022–2023 blockade of the Republic of Artsakh outside the Turkish Consulate General In Los Angeles, in Beverly Hills, discovered numerous Armenophic flyers in the vicinity. Mayor Lili Bosse immediately denounced the flyers on social media as the Beverly Hills Police Department reviewed surveillance camera footage. This incident was condemned by a number of local officials, including President of the Los Angeles City Council Paul Krekorian, West Hollywood Mayor Sepi Shyne, California State Assemblymember Wendy Carrillo, and Los Angeles County Supervisor Lindsey Horvath.

=== School conflicts ===
For decades, Latinos were the dominant minority ethnic group in Glendale, but by 2000, Armenians had become the new "majority minority." During this era, Glendale's Herbert Hoover High School grappled with violence between Latino and Armenian students, culminating in the death of student Raul Aguirre in 2000. A 2018 altercation resulted in the cancellation of the "Battle for the Victory Bell," an annual football match between rivals Hoover High School and Glendale High School. In response, Shant Sahakian, Glendale's Arts and Culture Commissioner, stated "This incident brings back painful memories without closure for our entire community."

At Ulysses S. Grant High School, in Van Nuys, ethnic tensions exploded on October 21, 1999, when a fight between an Armenian girl and a Latina girl turned into a fight among 200 students. The fight resulted in 40 students being detained and minor injuries being inflicted on 10 students, some teachers, and a maintenance worker. In January 2000, the students signed a "peace treaty" to prevent future fighting. By February, banners were erected which promoted peace. By October of that year, there were discussion programs aimed at further reducing tension. Ethnic tensions flared up again in 2005, resulting in a fight involving nearly 500 students. By 2019, Grant had become "a predominately Armenian school[.]"

=== Gang violence ===
Armenian Power has had a history of conflict with Mexican American Sureño gangs. Armen "Silent" Petrosyan, a founder of Armenian Power, was shot to death in Little Armenia on May 22, 2000, by Jose Argueta, a member of the Sureño White Fence gang.

== Allegations of crime ==
In October 2010 the Federal Government of the United States accused 52 persons of being involved in a Medicare fraud operation orchestrated by an Armenian organized crime group; the persons were arrested. In February 2011 the federal government accused the Armenian Power gang (formed in the 1990s in response to aggression by Mexican gangs) of committing white-collar crime. That month, 74 people were arrested in Southern California. The federal authorities revealed the indictments at the Glendale police headquarters. The charges were racketeering and fraud. Jason Wells and Veronica Rocha of the Glendale News-Press wrote that in Glendale, as a result of the 2011 arrests, "news of the arrests raised fears of what seems to be the inevitable: a rush by a vocal few to reinforce stereotypes."

== Notable residents ==
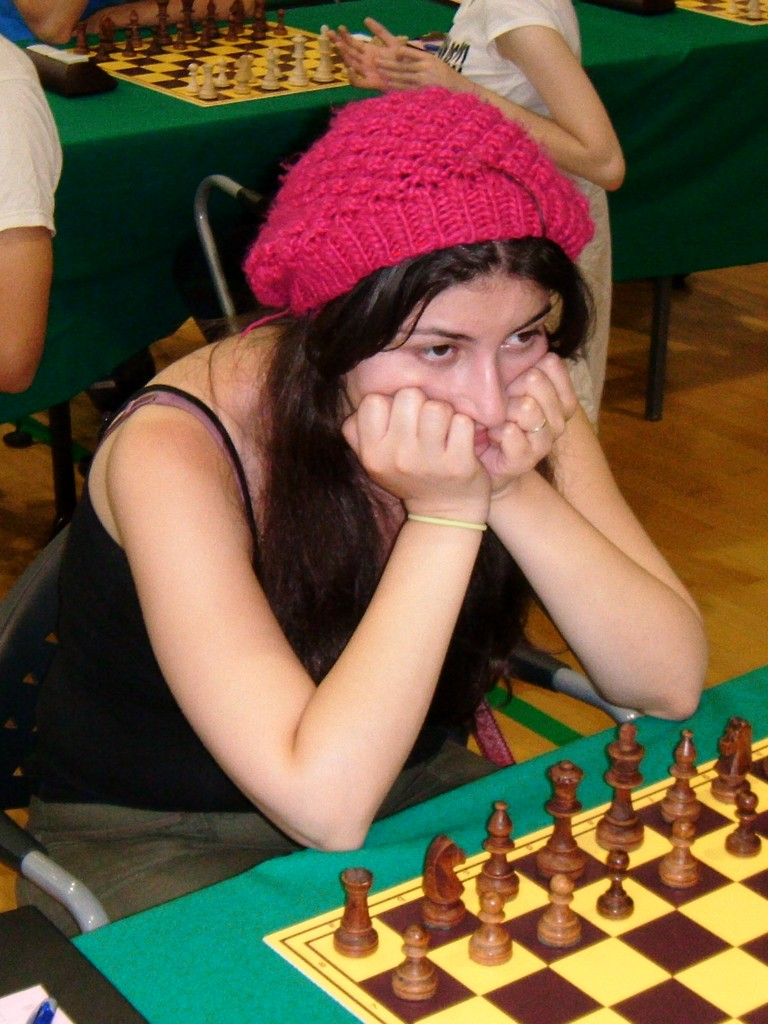
Tatev Abrahamyan (Woman Grandmaster in chess)

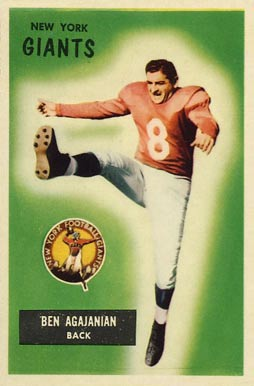
Ben Agajanian (American football player)

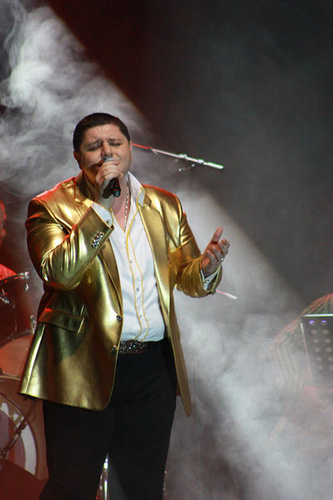
Armenchik (singer)

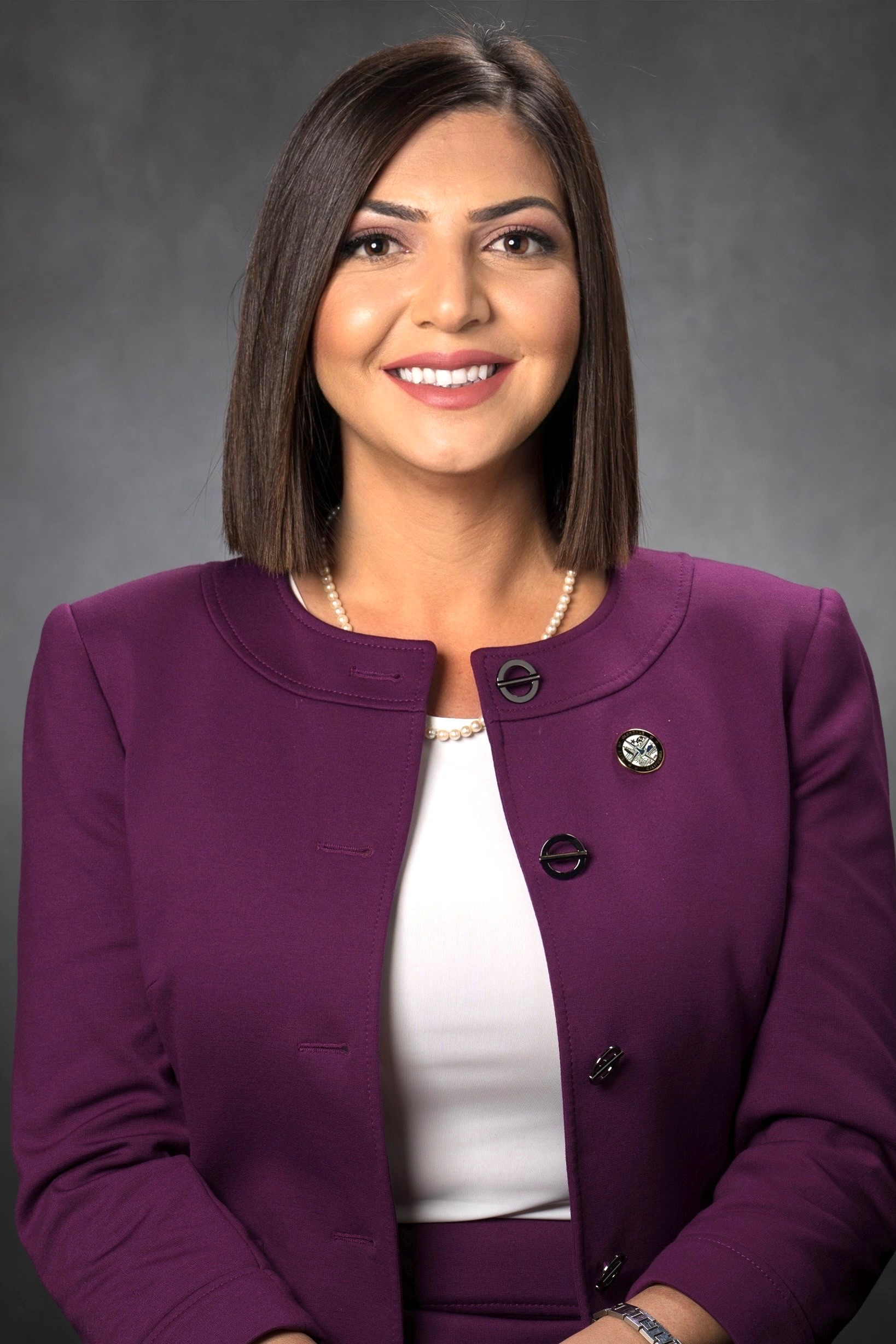
Elen Asatryan (politician)

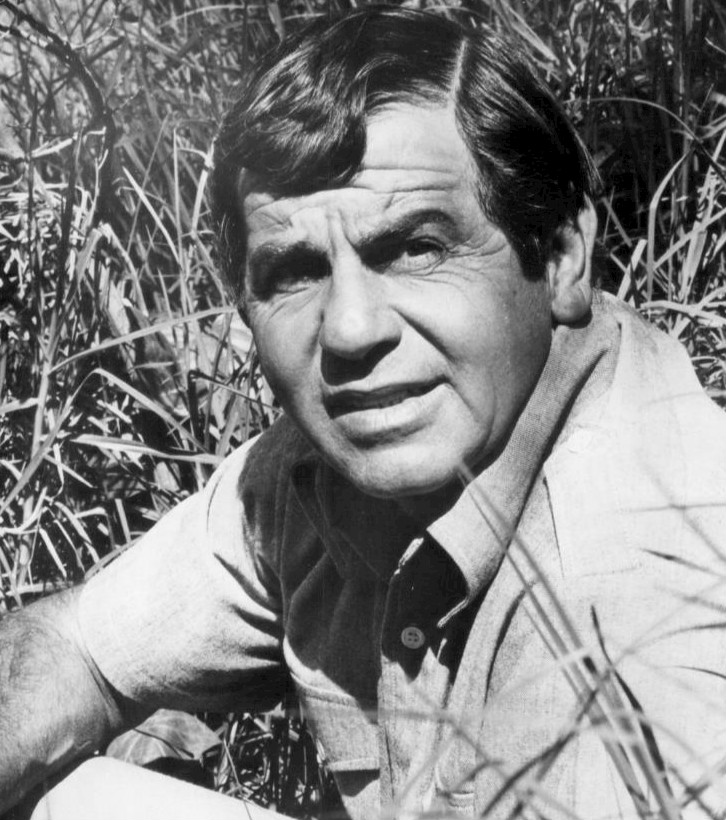
Ross Bagdasarian Sr. (singer, songwriter)

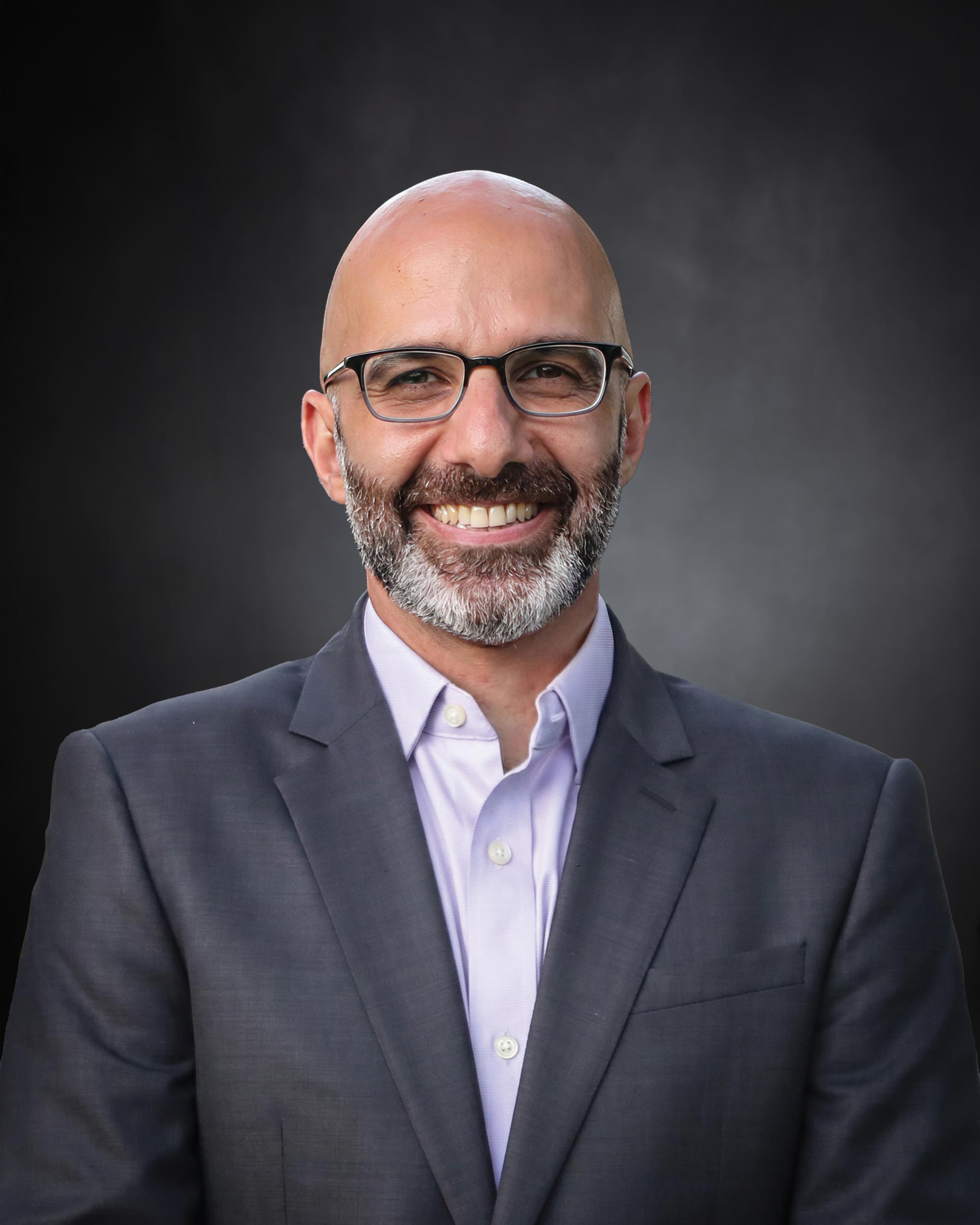
Alek Bartrosouf (politician)

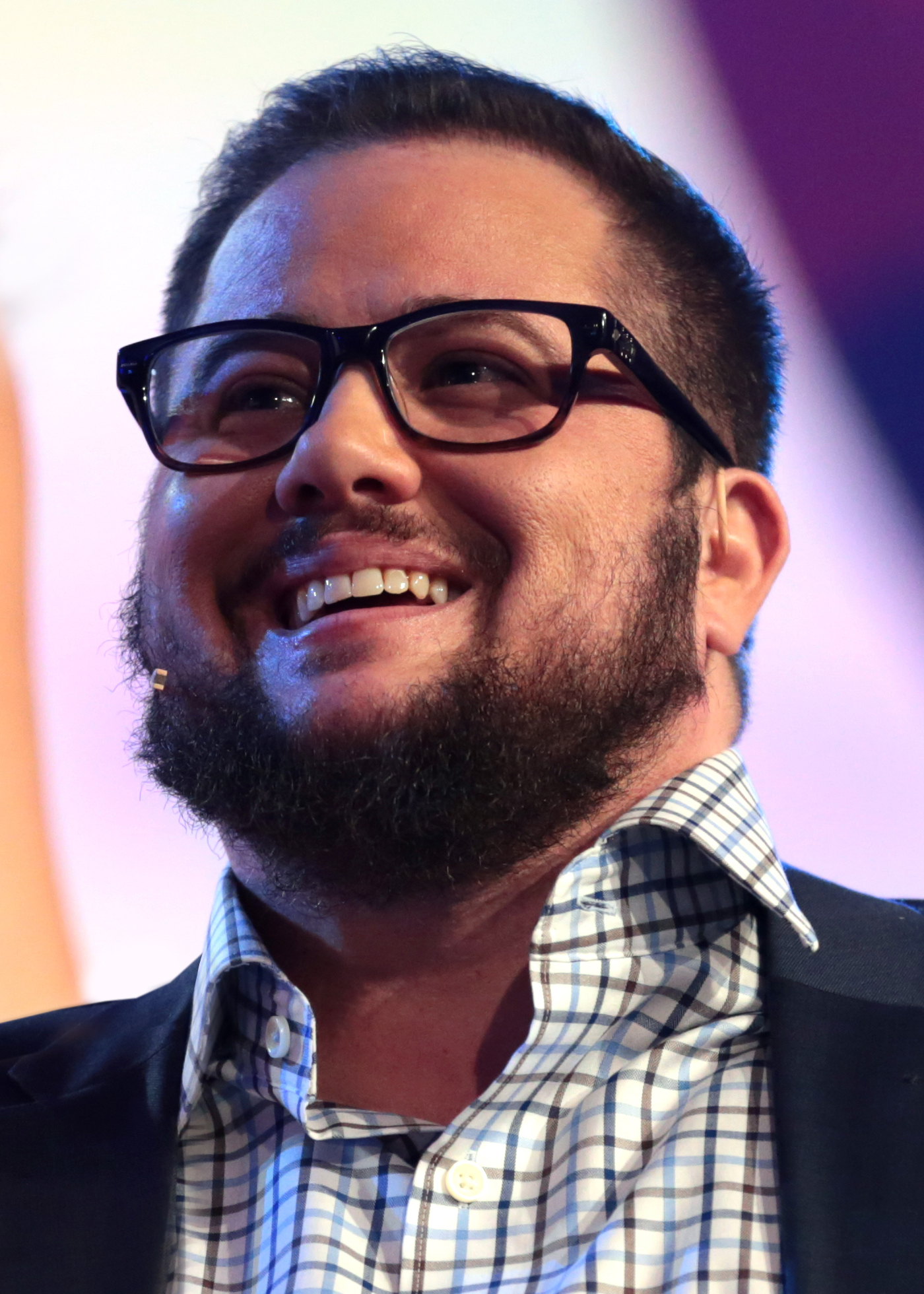
Chaz Bono (writer, musician and actor)

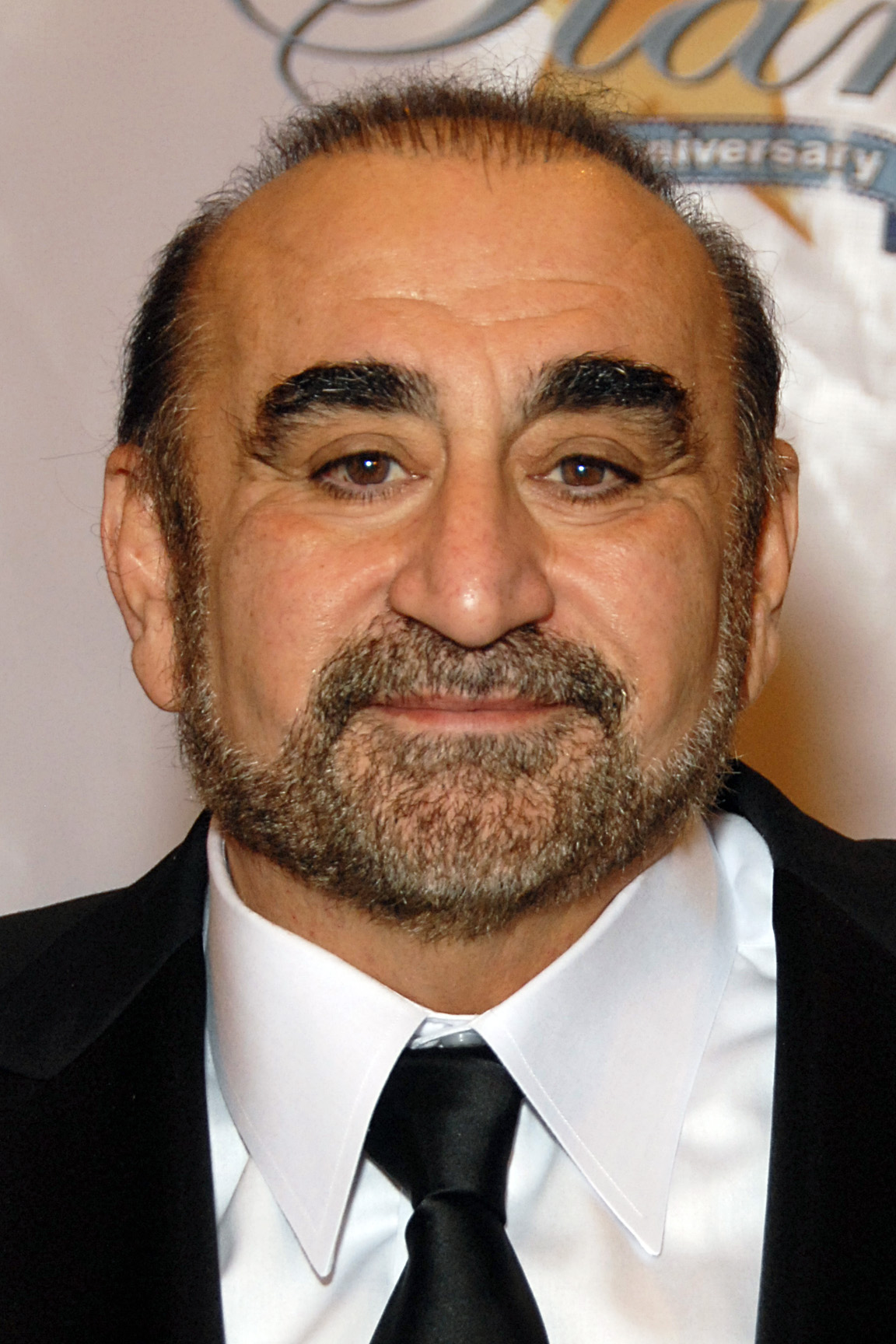
Ken Davitian (actor)

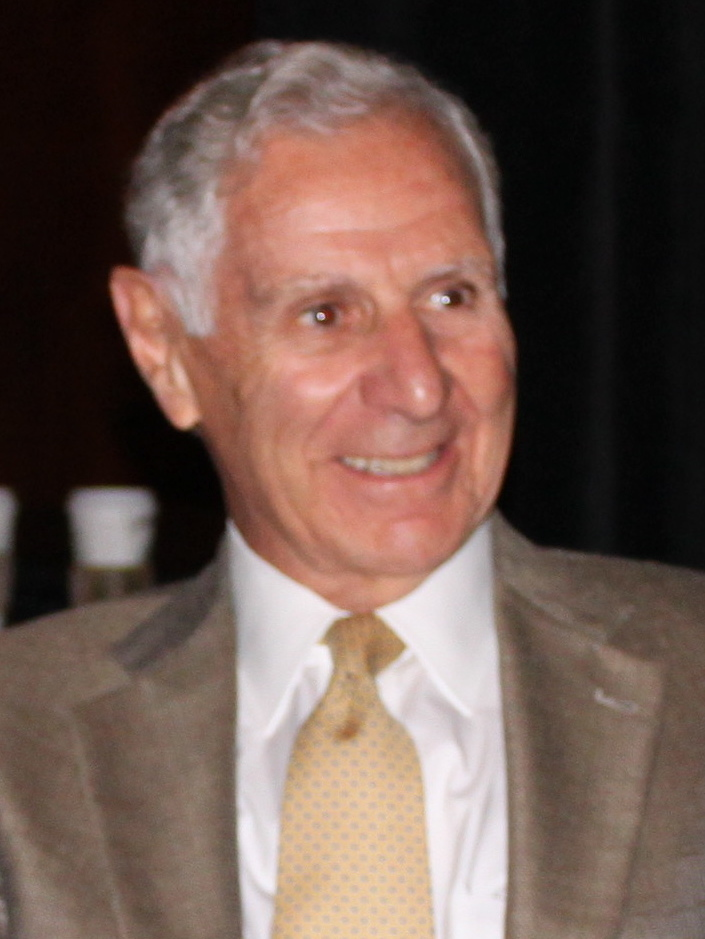
George Deukmejian (former Governor of California)

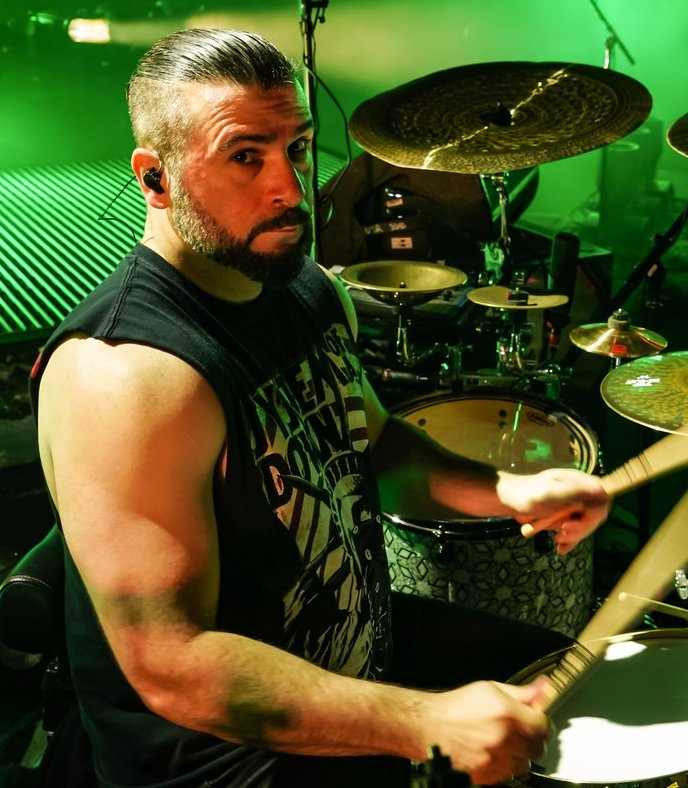
John Dolmayan (drummer for System of a Down)

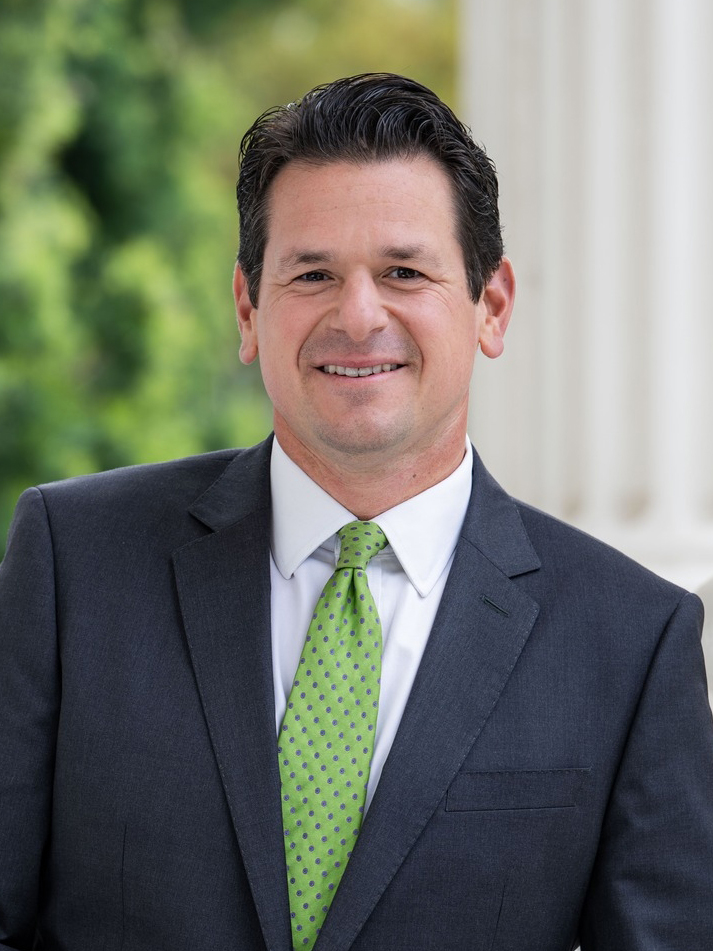
John Harabedian (politician)

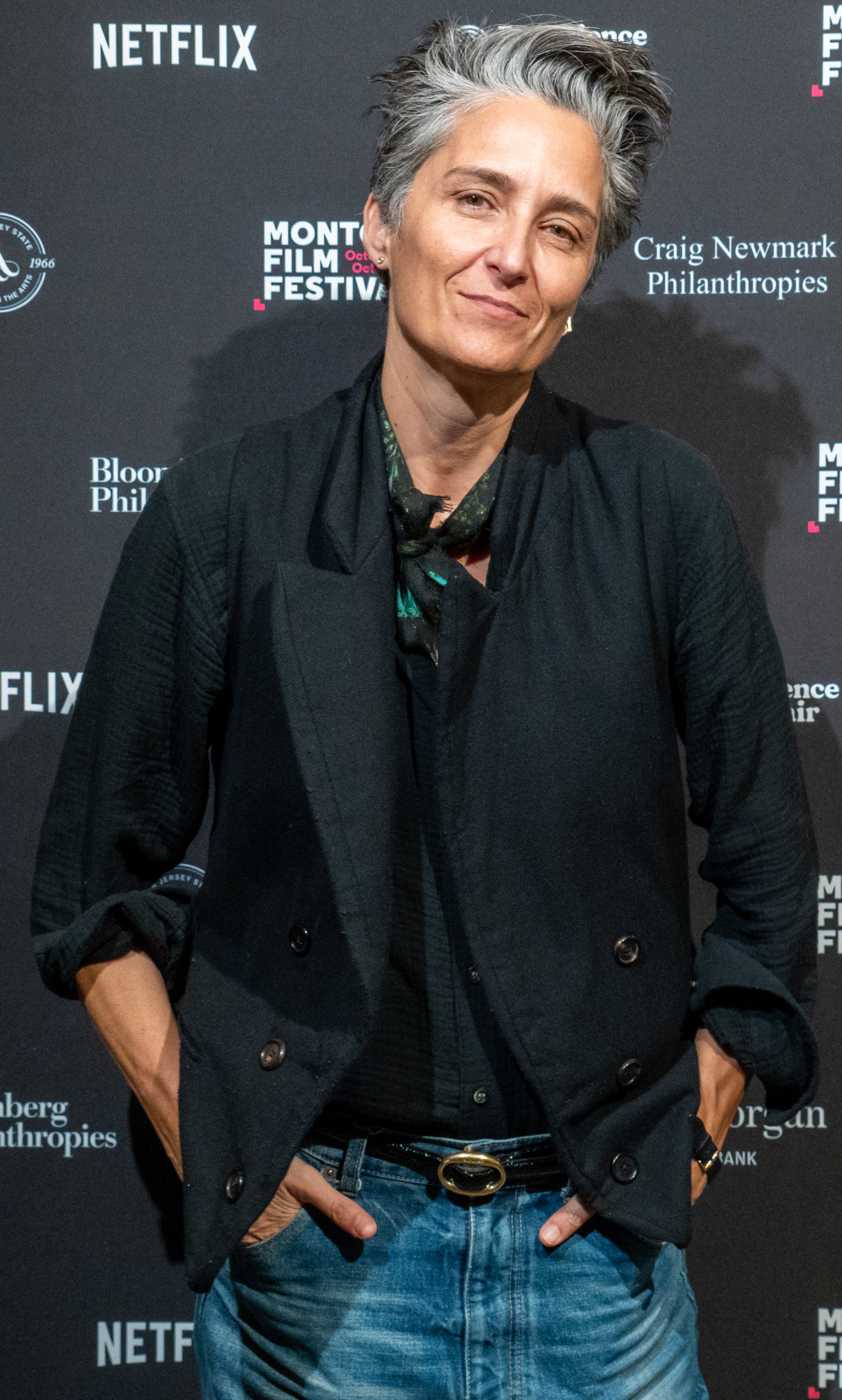
Alexandra Hedison

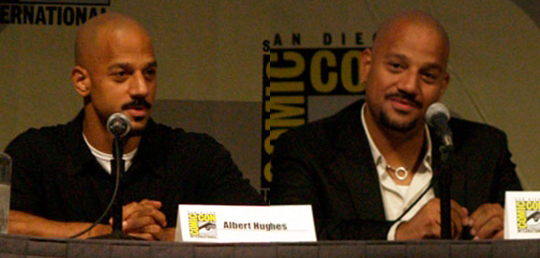
Albert and Allen Hughes (film directors)

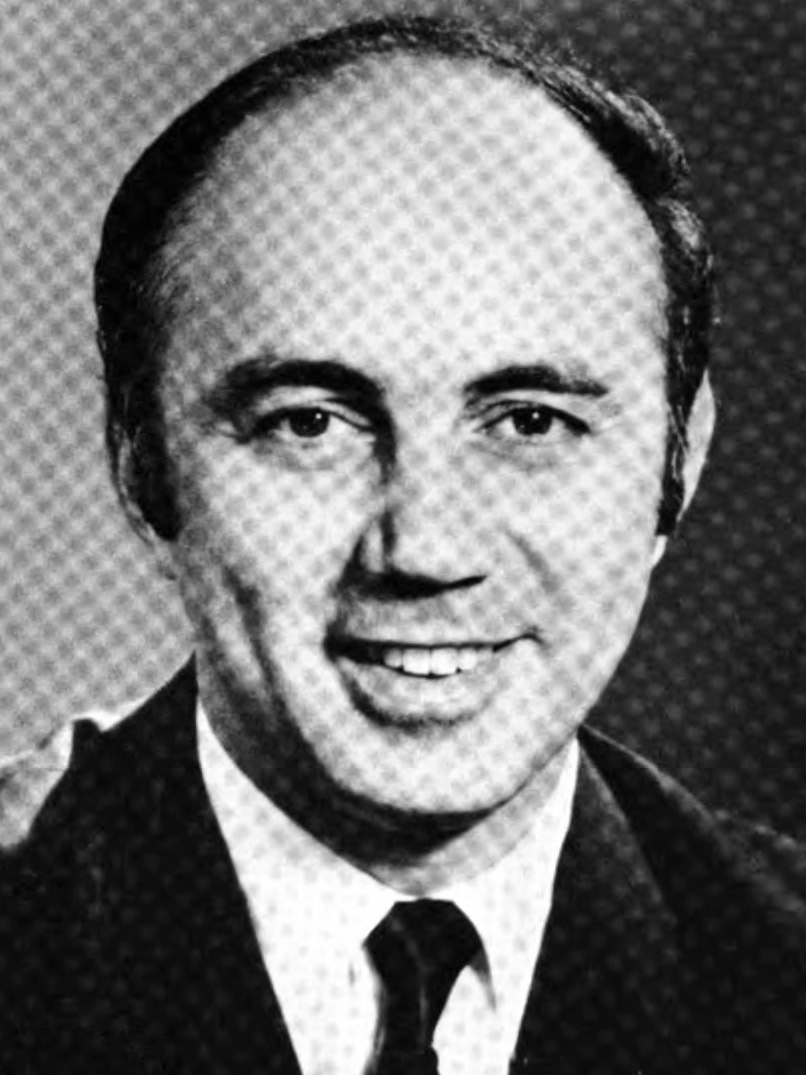
Walter J. Karabian (politician)

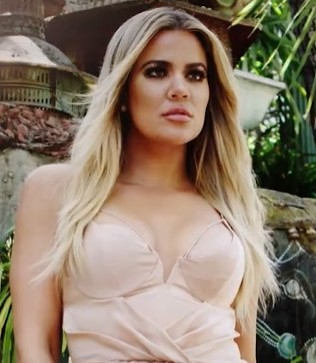
Khloé Kardashian

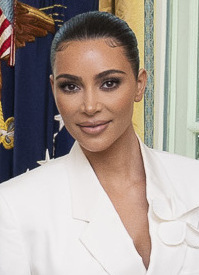
Kim Kardashian

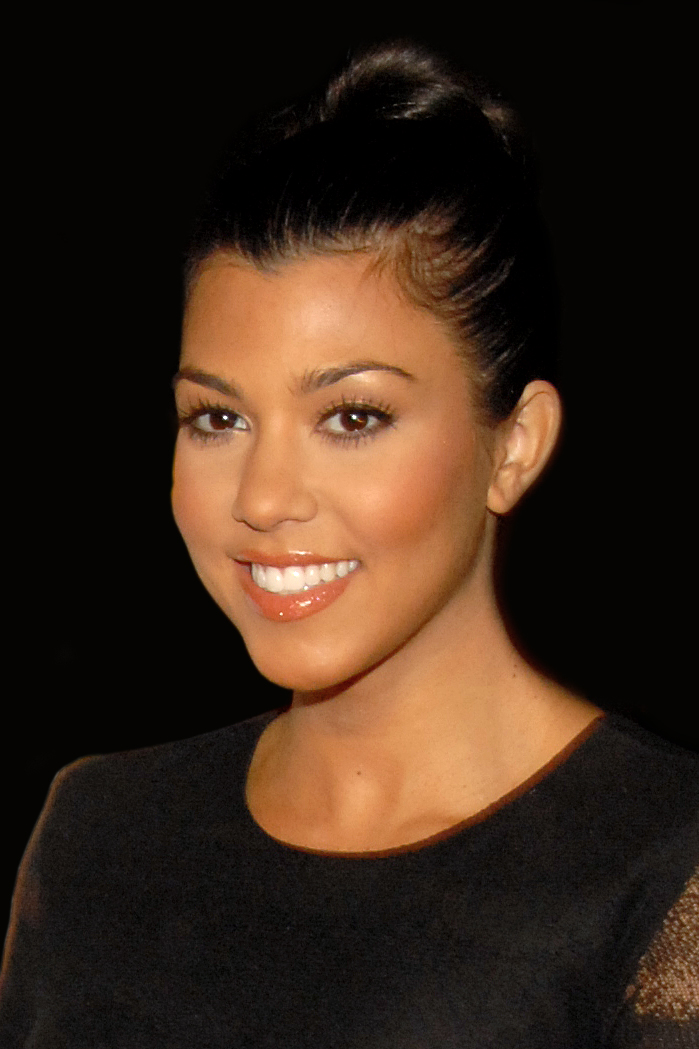
Kourtney Kardashian

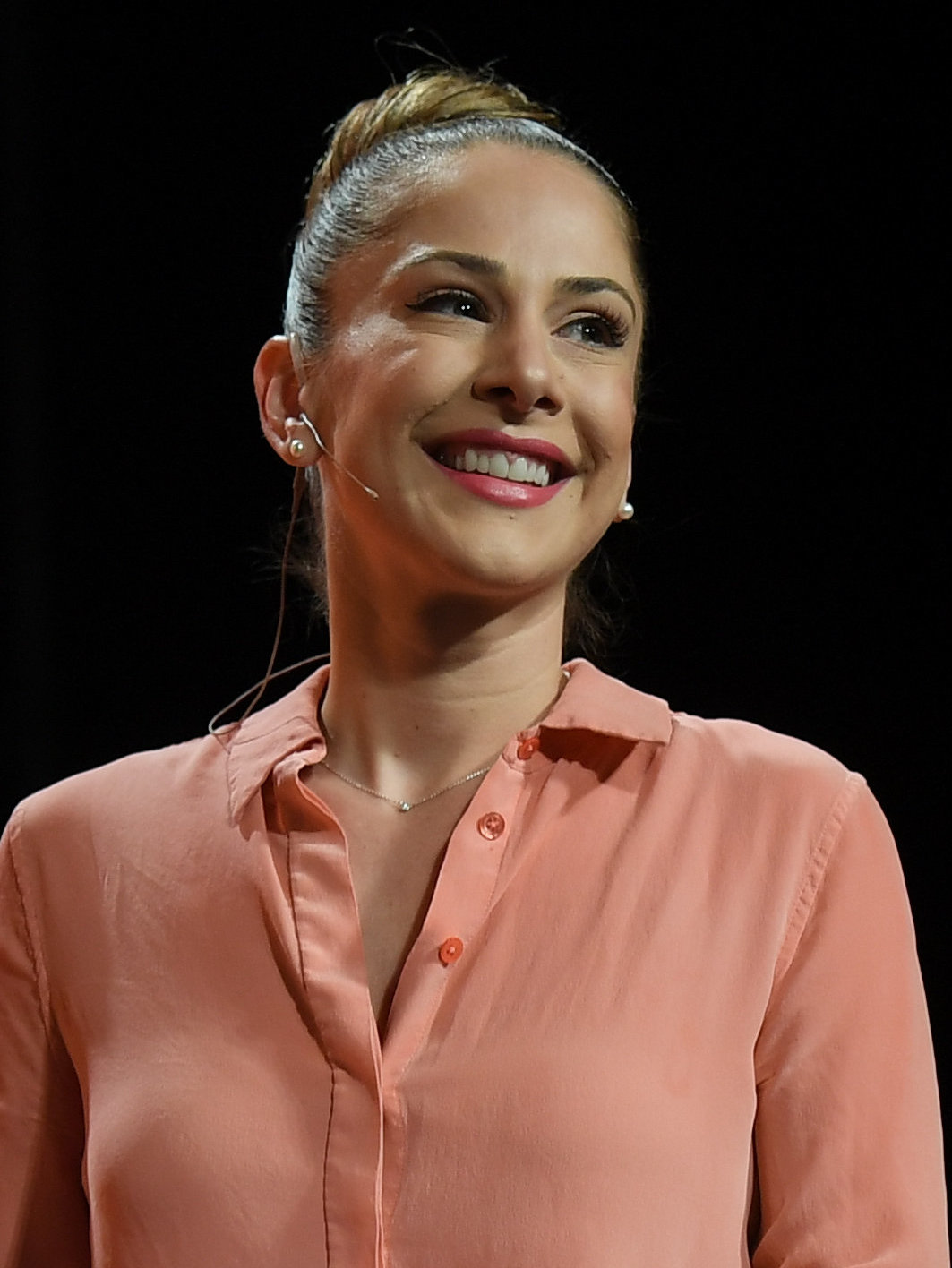
Ana Kasparian (political commentator)

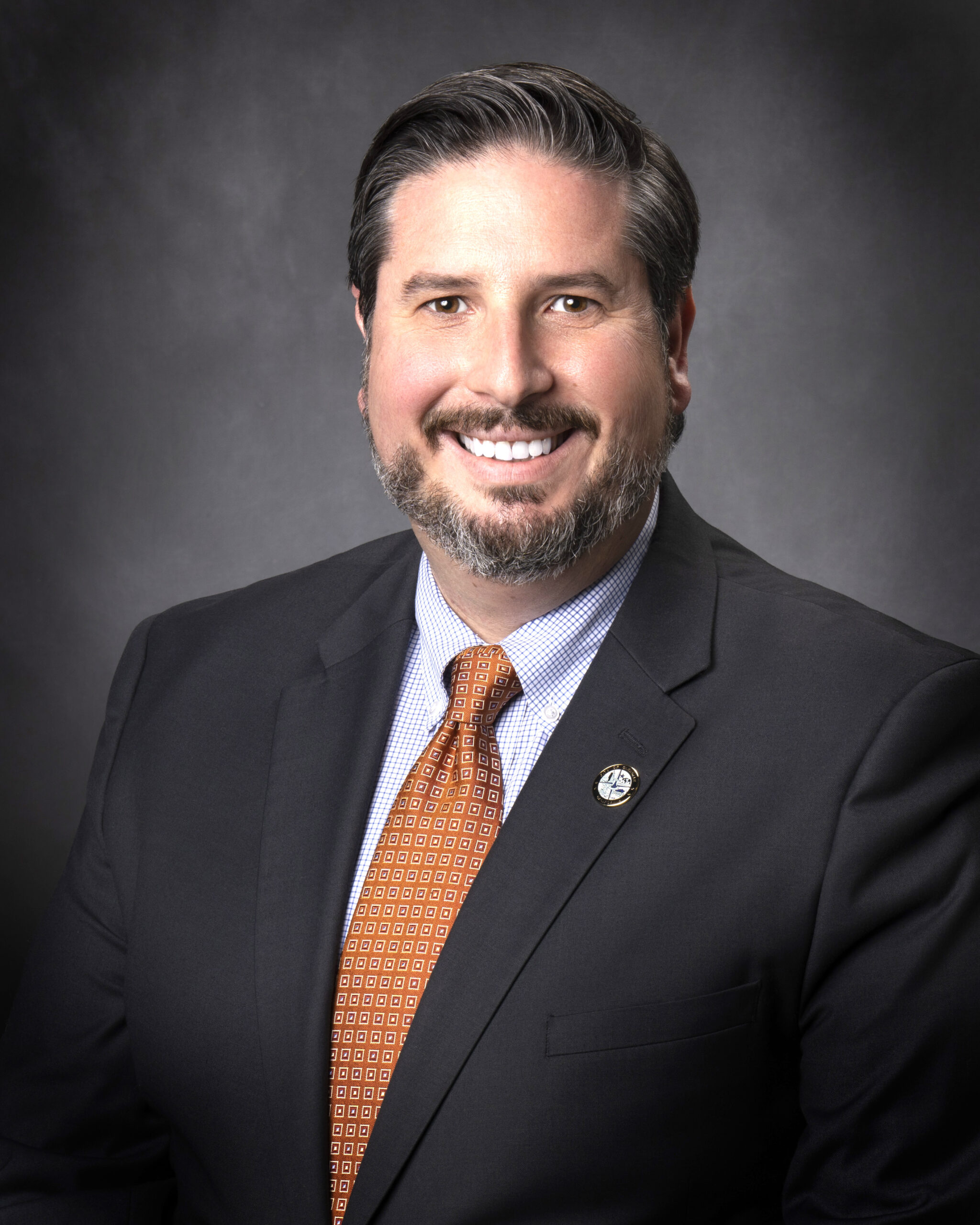
Ardy Kassakhian (politician)

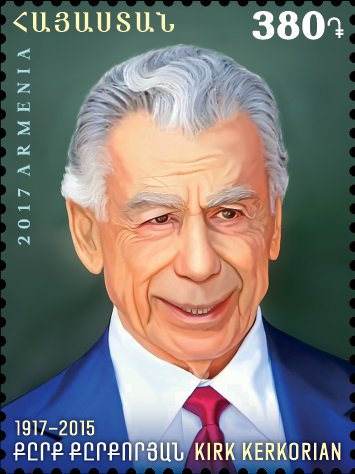
Kirk Kerkorian

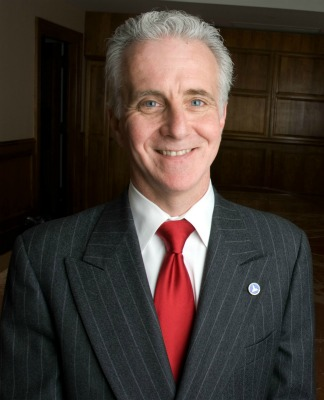
Paul Krekorian (politician)

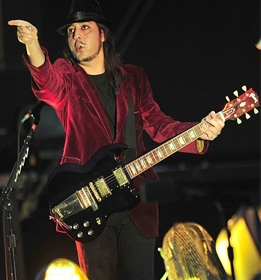
Daron Malakian (guitarist for System of a Down)

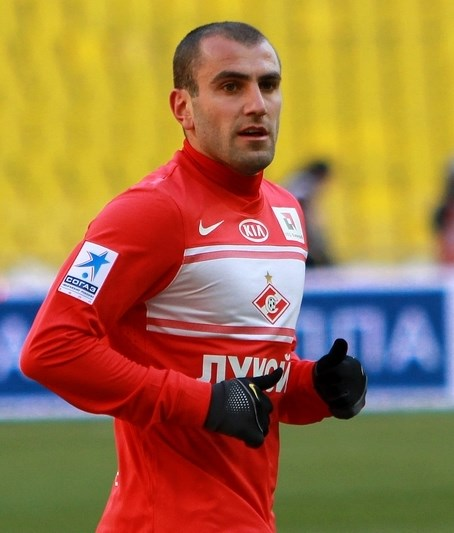
Yura Movsisyan (former footballer)

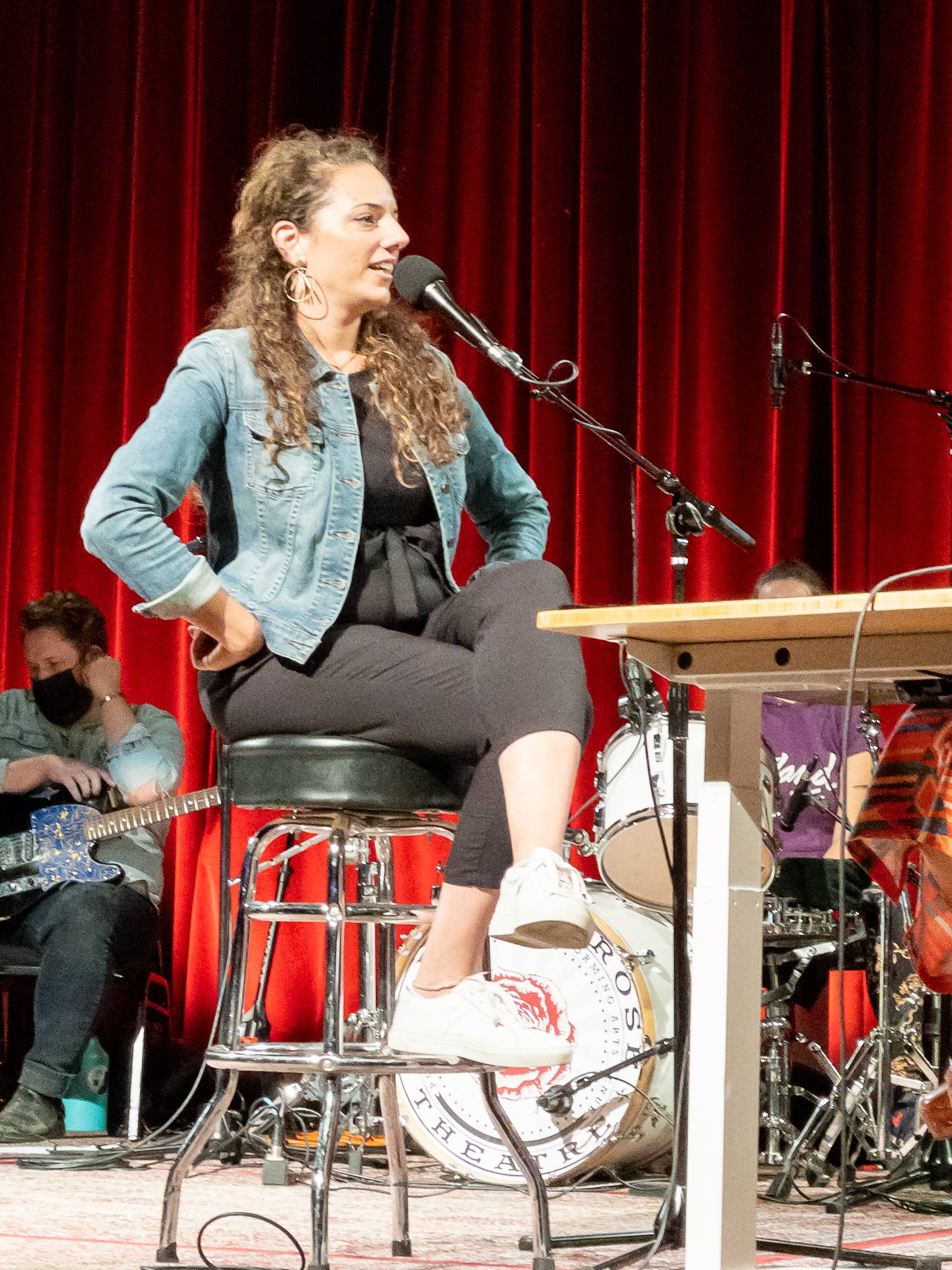
Sona Movsesian (podcaster/assistant to Conan O'Brien)

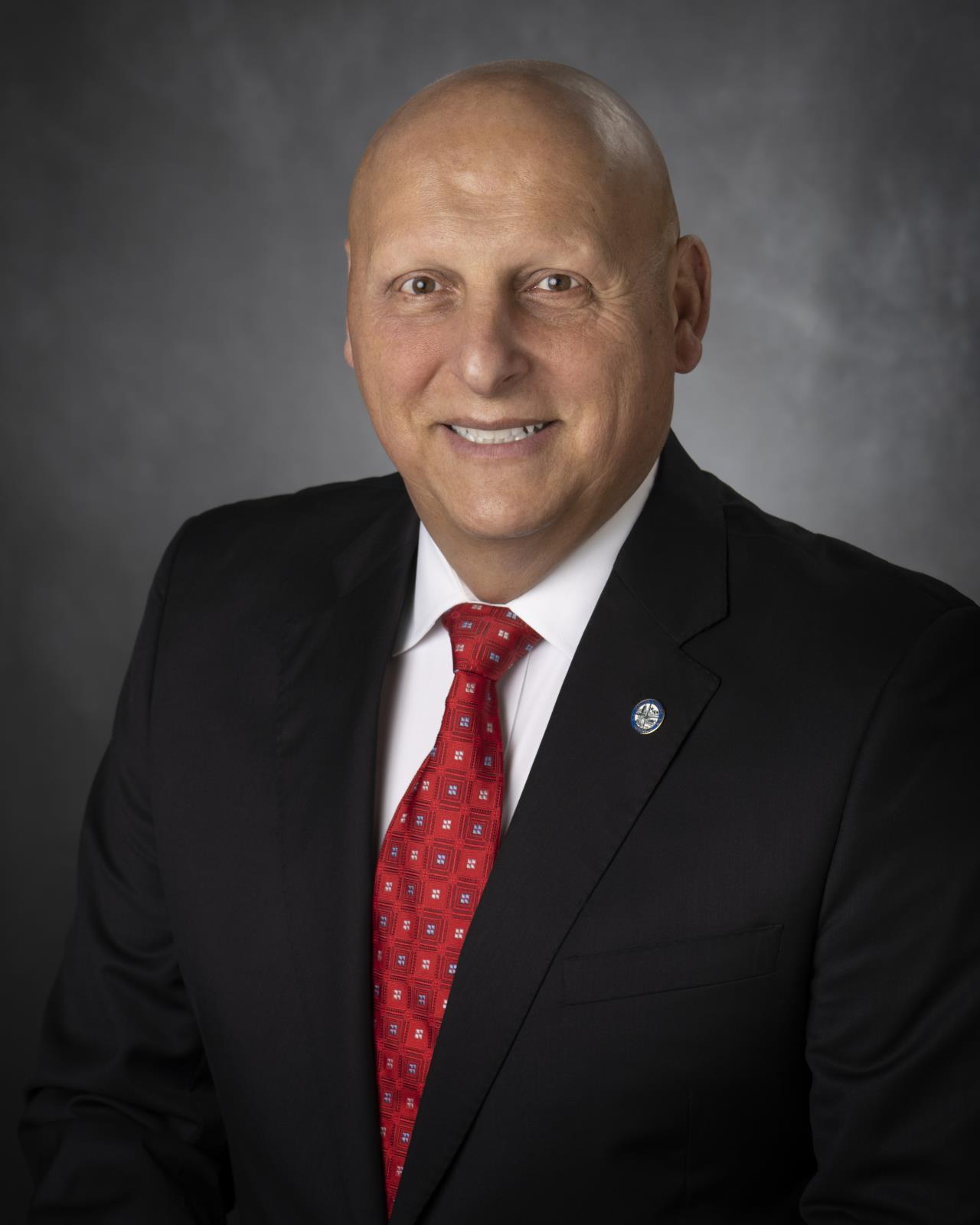
Ara Najarian (politician)

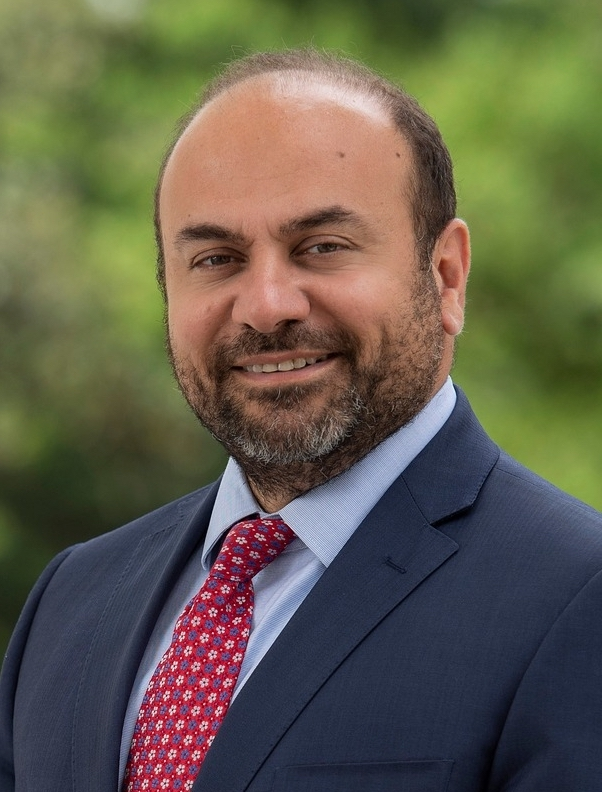
Adrin Nazarian (politician)

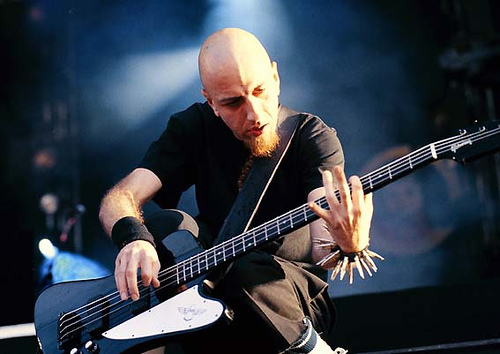
Shavo Odadjian (bassist for System of a Down)

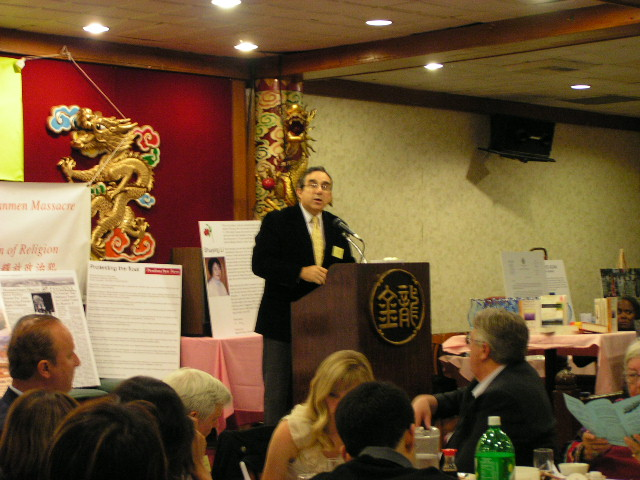
Bill Paparian (politician)

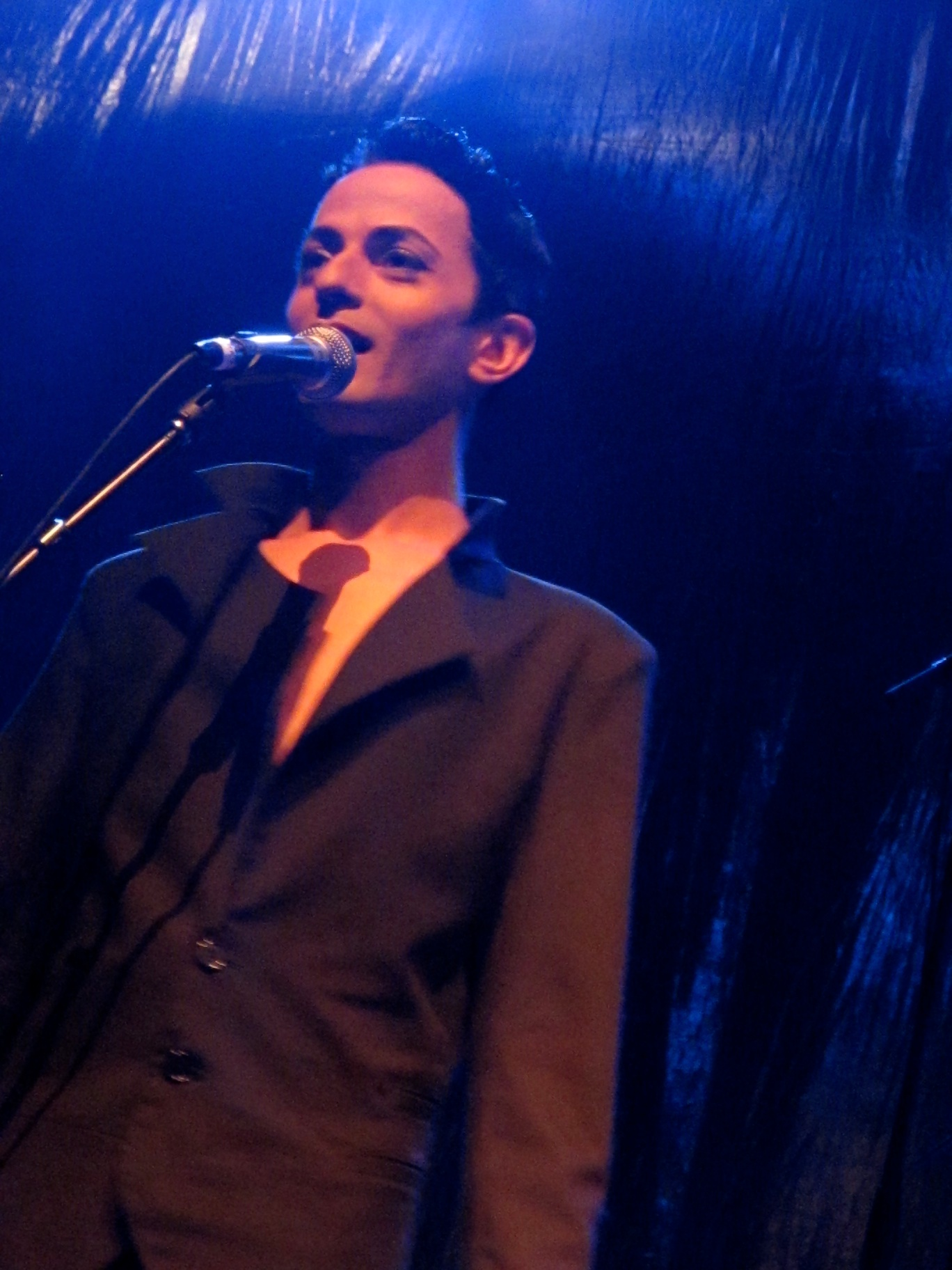
Armen Ra (thereminist)

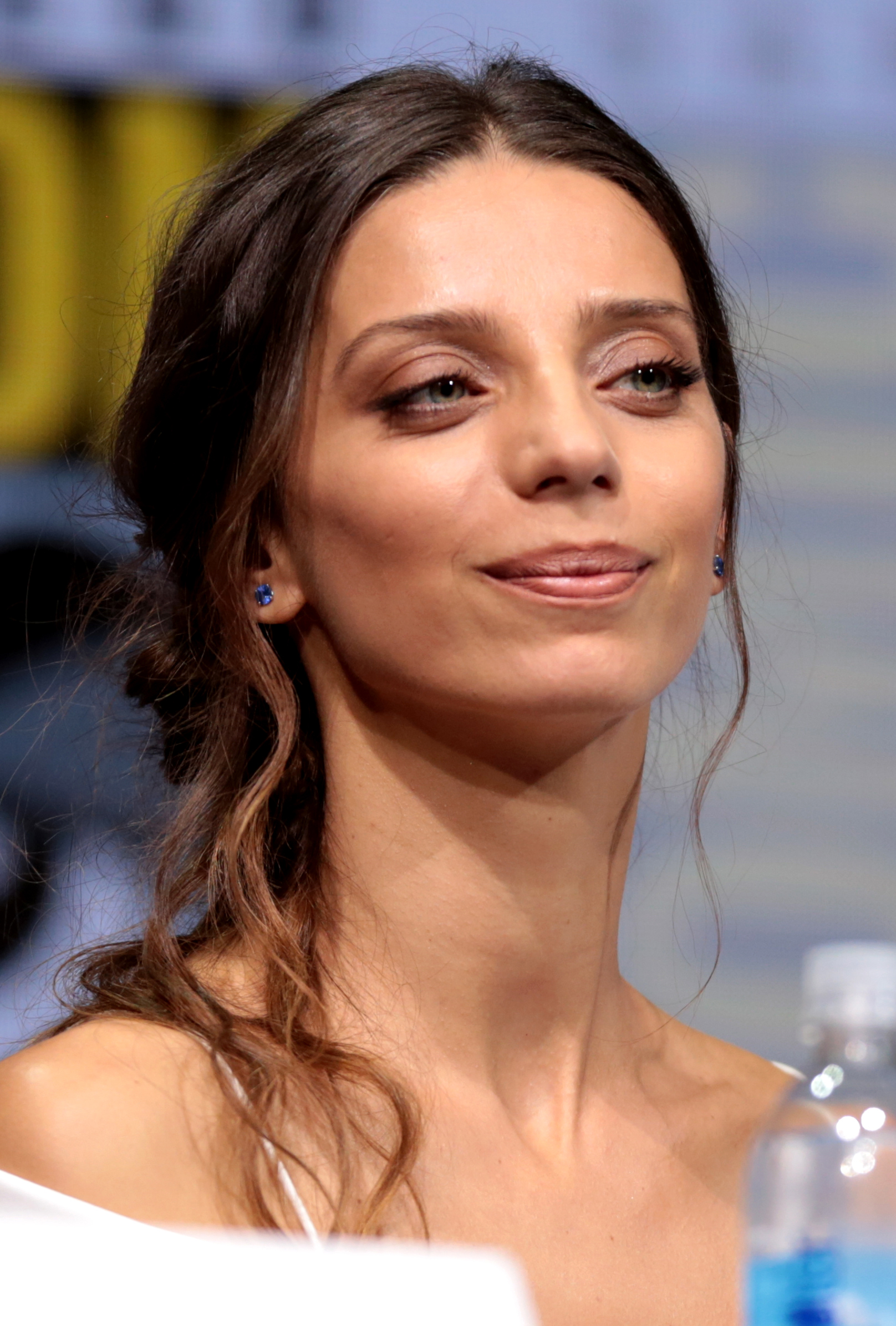
Angela Sarafyan (actress)

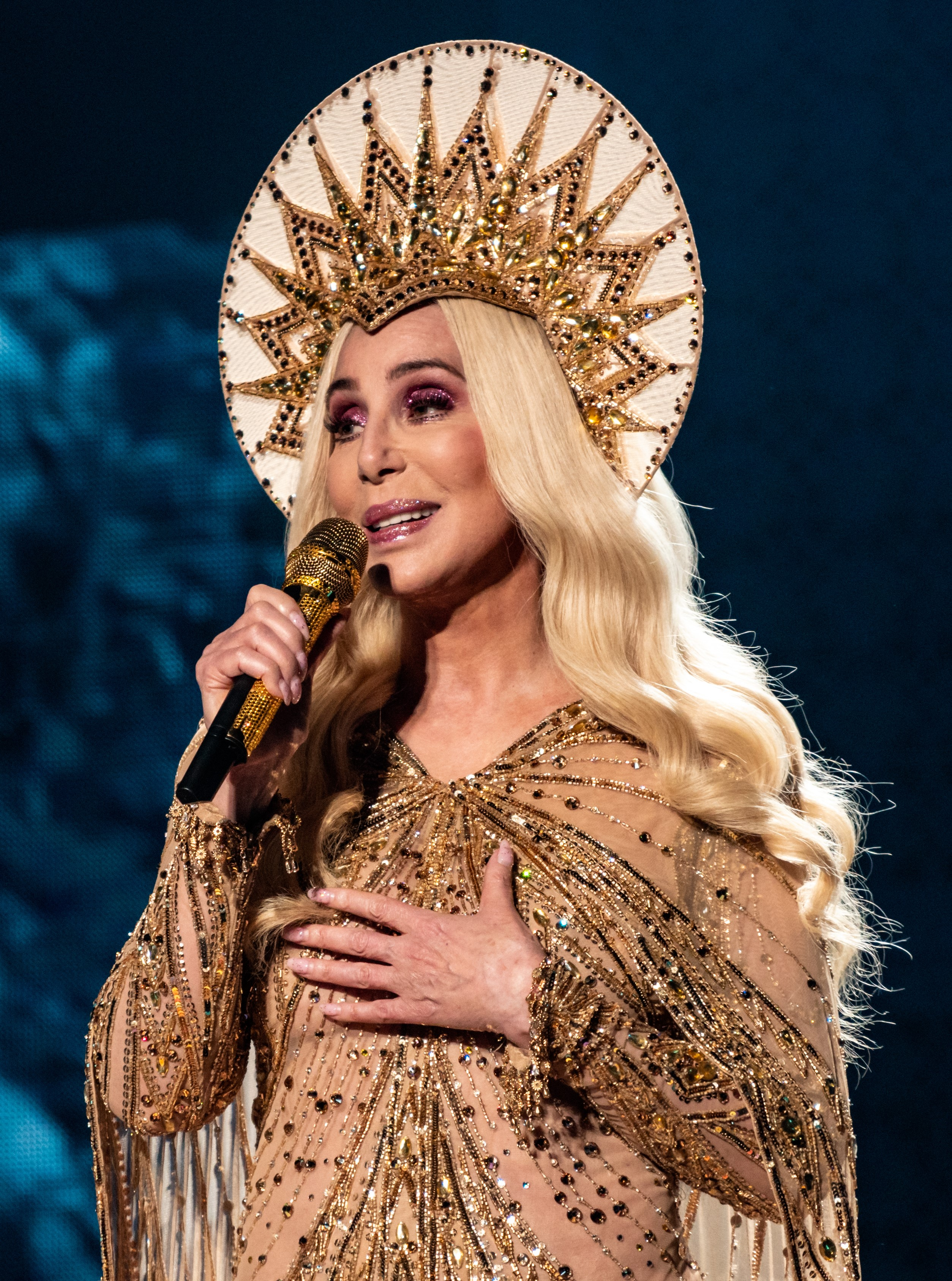
Cher (Cherilyn Sarkisian) (singer)

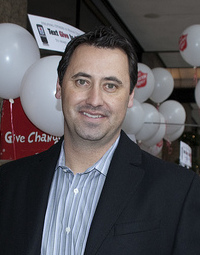
Steve Sarkisian (former USC head football coach)

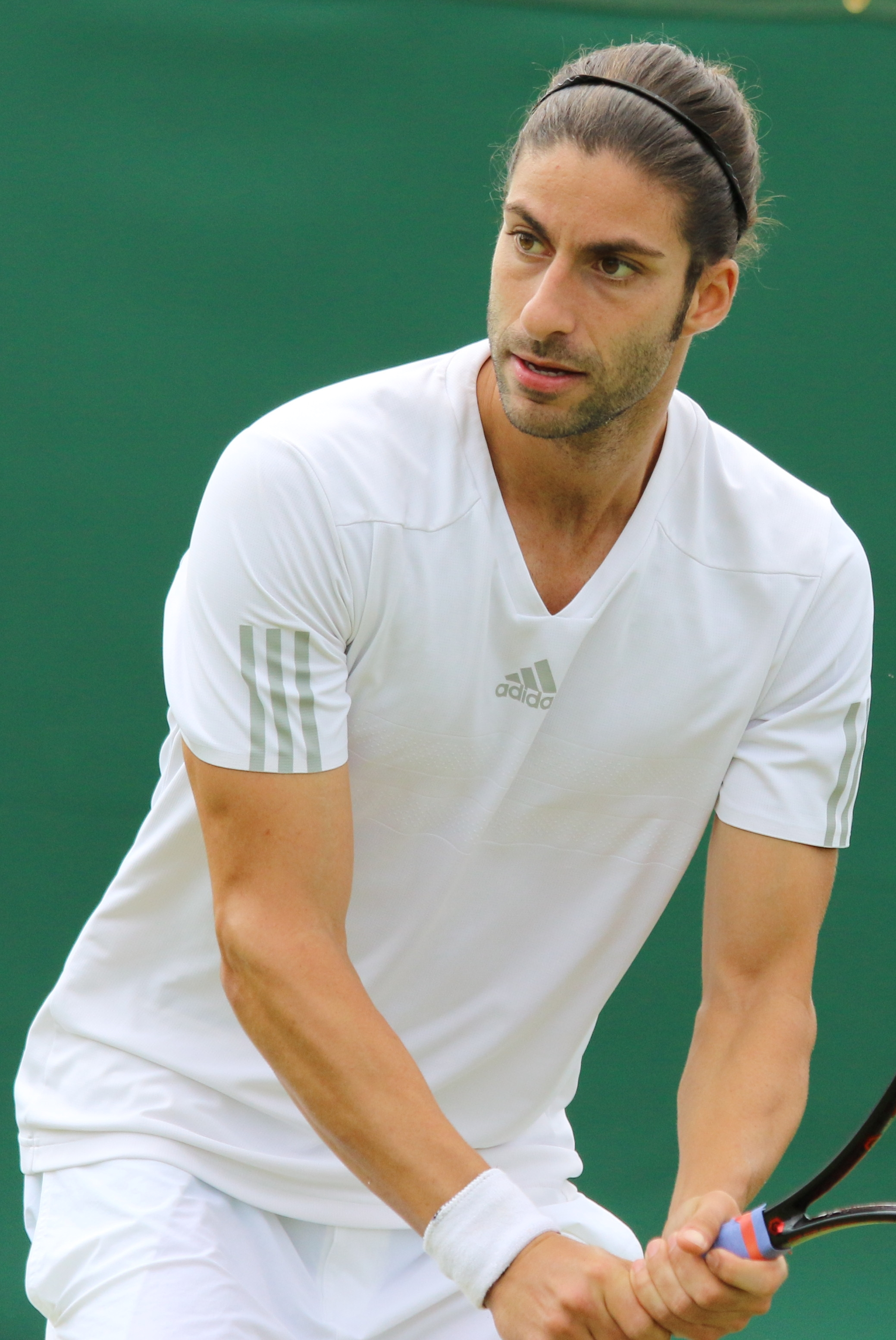
Alexander Sarkissian (tennis player)

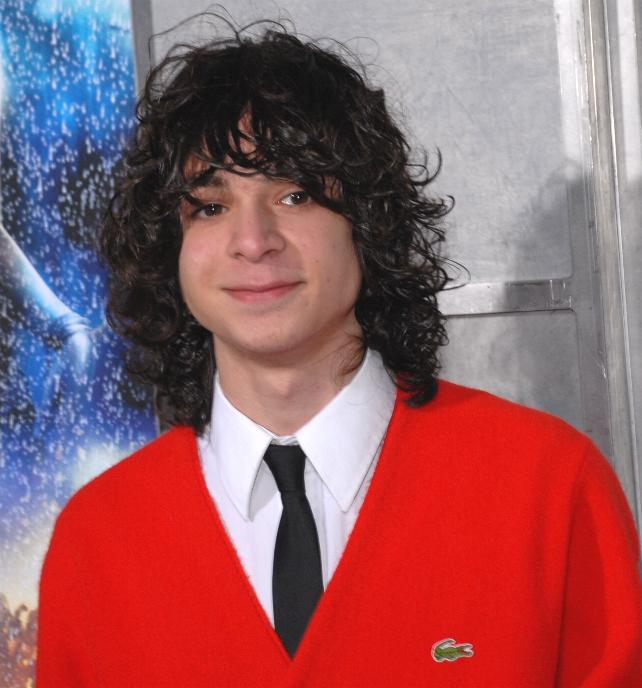
Adam G. Sevani (actor)

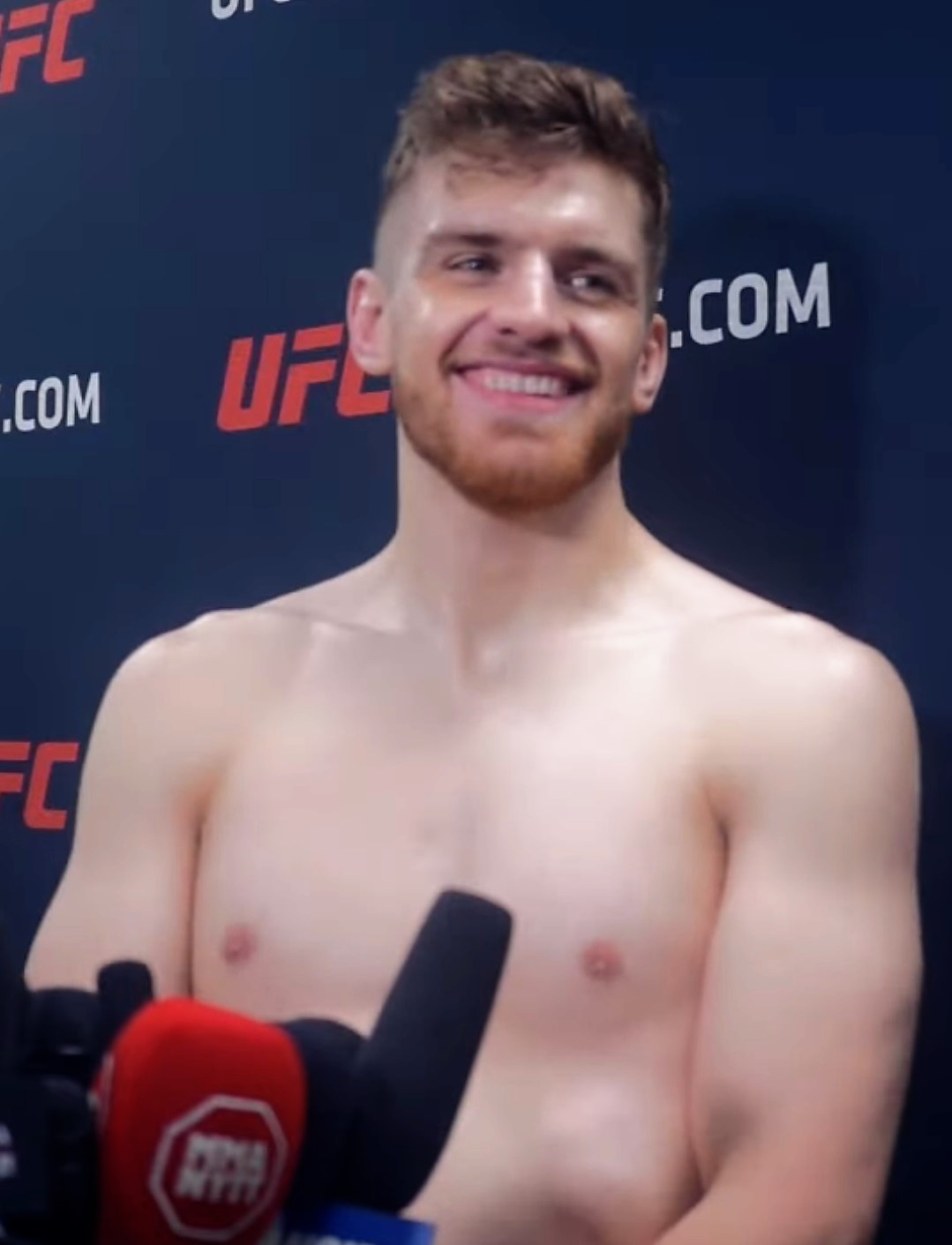
Edmen Shahbazyan, (mixed martial artist)

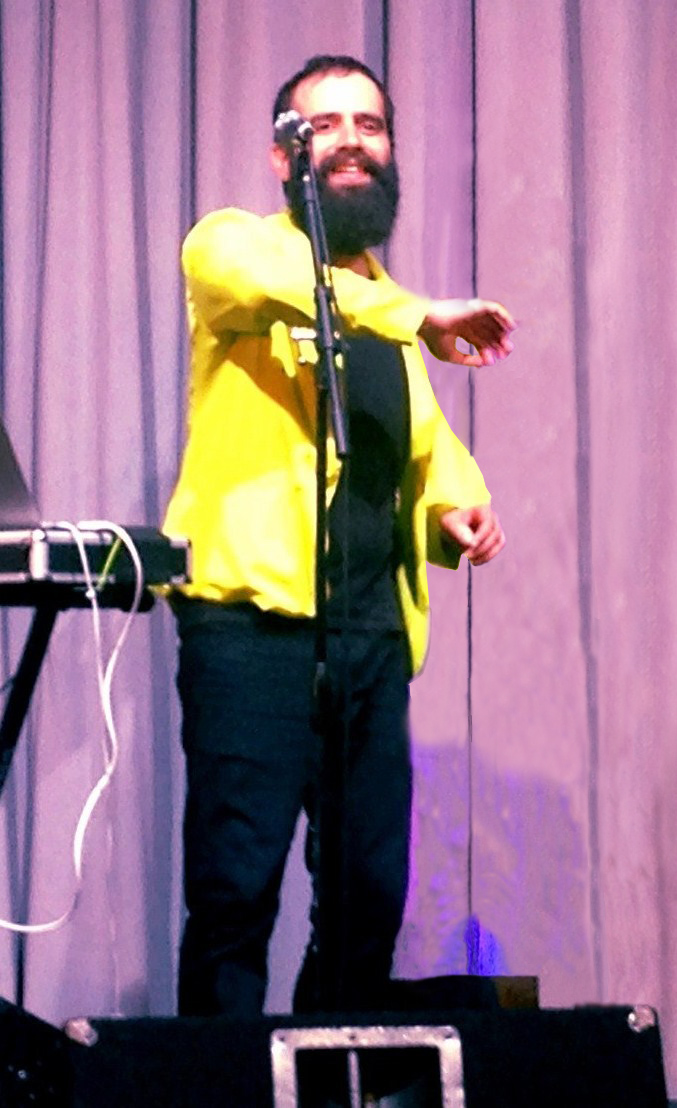
Sebu Simonian (member of Capital Cities)

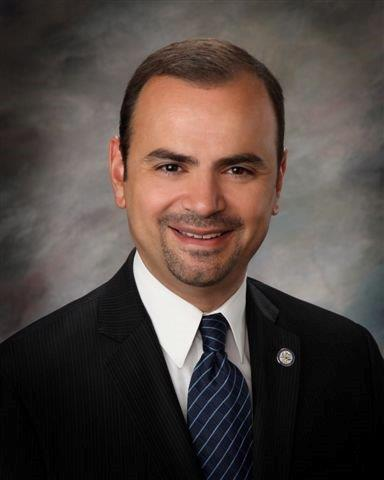
Zareh Sinanyan (politician)

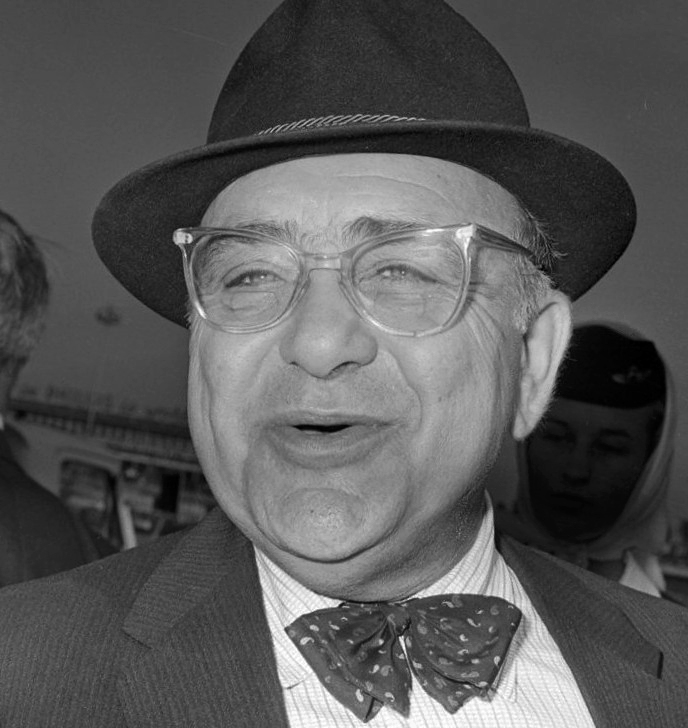
Akim Tamiroff, actor

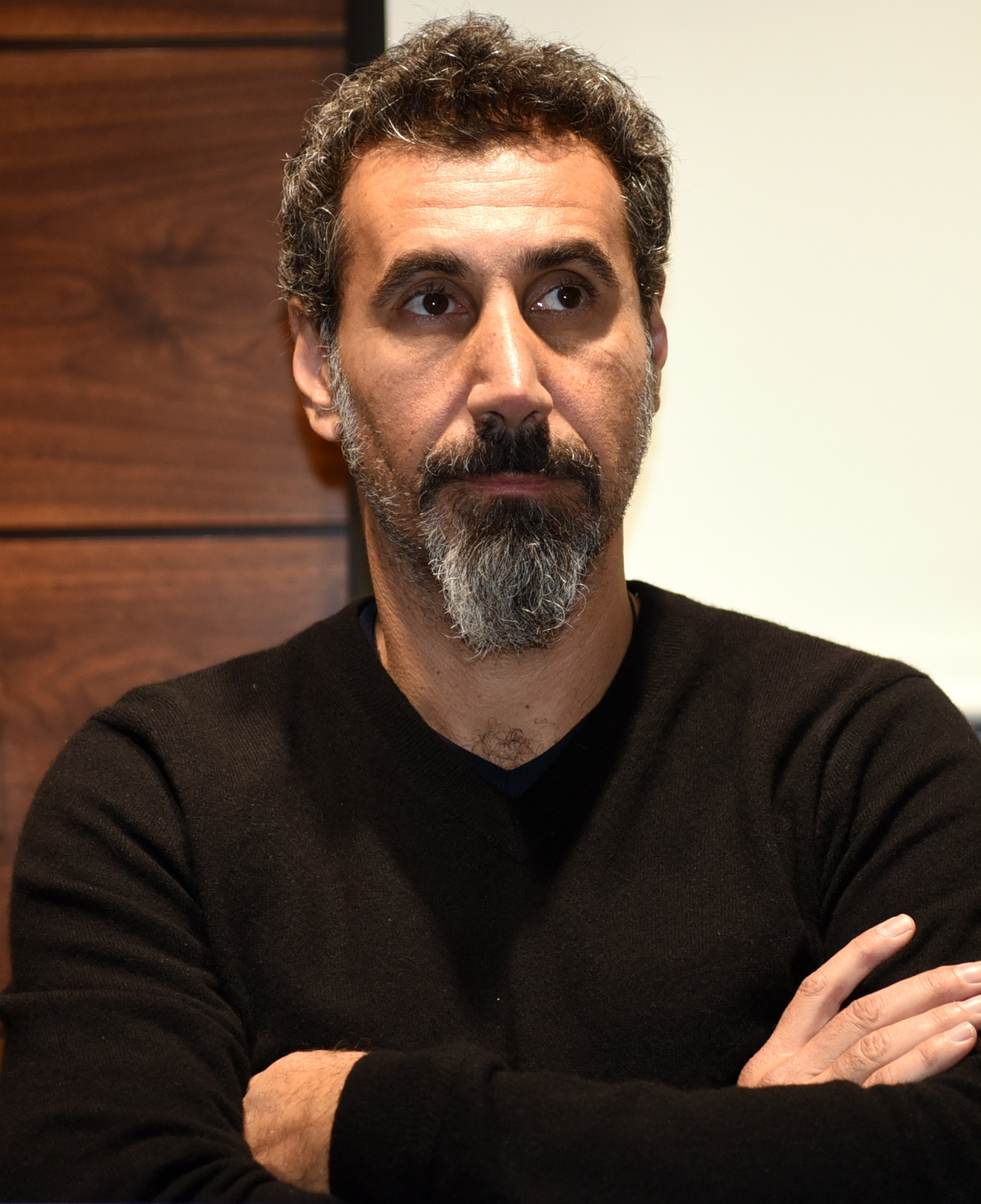
Serj Tankian (singer for System of a Down)

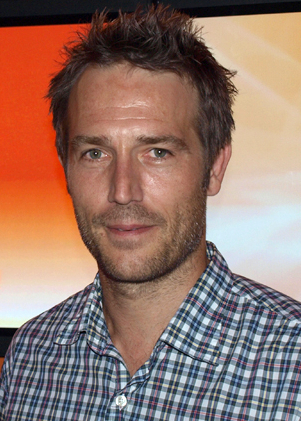
Michael Vartan (actor)

== See also ==
- Bibliography of California history
- Bibliography of Los Angeles
- Outline of the history of Los Angeles
