= Bob Yousefian =

American politician

Mayor of Glendale, California
- In office April 2004 – April 2005
- Preceded by: Frank Quintero
- Succeeded by: Rafi Manoukian

Personal details
- Born: December 24, 1957 (age 68) Sanandaj, Iran
- Spouse: Sue Yousefian
- Occupation: Businessman, politician

Bob Yousefian is the former mayor of Glendale, California.

== Biography ==
Bob Yousefian was born in Iran, moved to Lebanon as a teenager and later followed his family to the United States.

On April 3, 2001, Yousefian won the election and became a member of city council in Glendale, California. Yousefian received 14.53% of the votes. In April 2004, Yousefian became the mayor of Glendale, California, until April 2005.

In August 2007, Yousefian was arrested.

== See also ==
- History of the Armenian Americans in Los Angeles
- History of the Iranian Americans in Los Angeles
