= List of Armenian schools in the United States =

The table below lists the Armenian schools in the United States.

School	Location	State	Administration	Founded	Grades	Enrollment	Website
Saint Stephen's Armenian Elementary School	Watertown, MA	MA	Eastern Prelacy	1984	PreK-5	175	www.ssaes.org
Holy Martyrs Armenian Day School	Bayside, NY	NY	Eastern Diocese	1967	PreK-6	87	www.hmads.org
Hovnanian School	New Milford, NJ	NJ	Independent	1976	Childcare-8	153	www.hovnanianschool.org
Armenian Sisters' Academy	Radnor, PA	PA	Armenian Catholic	1967	PreK-8	140	www.asaphila.org
AGBU Alex & Marie Manoogian School	Southfield, MI	MI	AGBU	1969	K-12	414	www.manoogian.org
Krouzian-Zekarian Vasbouragan School	San Francisco, CA	CA	Western Prelacy	1980	PreK-8	138	www.kzv.org
Charlie Keyan Armenian Community School	Clovis, CA	CA	Independent (Apostolic)	1977	K-6	112	www.ckacs.org
AGBU Alex & Marie Manoogian and Sarkis & Seta Demirdjian School	Canoga Park, CA	CA	AGBU	1976	PreK-12	712	www.agbumds.org
Ferrahian Armenian School	Encino, CA	CA	Western Prelacy	1964	PreK-12	684	www.ferrahian.com
Charlotte & Elise Merdinian Armenian Evangelical School	Sherman Oaks, CA	CA	Armenian Evangelical	1982	PreK-8	232	merdinianschool.org//
Rose and Alex Pilibos Armenian School	Hollywood, CA	CA	Western Prelacy	1969	PreK-12	858	www.pilibos.org
Mekhitarist Fathers' Armenian School	Sunland-Tujunga, CA	CA	Armenian Catholic	1979	PreK-K**	50	
Armenian Sisters' Academy	La Crescenta-Montrose, CA	CA	Armenian Catholic	1985	PreK-8	286	asamontrose.com
Vahan & Anoush Chamlian Armenian School	Glendale, CA	CA	Western Prelacy	1975	1-8	519	www.chamlian.org
Saint Mary's Richard Tufenkian PreSchool	Glendale, CA	CA	Western Prelacy	1975	PreK-K	165	www.tufenkianpreschool.com
Sahag-Mesrob Armenian Christian School	Altadena, CA	CA	Armenian Evangelical	1980	PreK-8***	191	sahagmesrobschool.org
Saint Sarkis' Levon & Hasmig Tufenkian PreSchool	Pasadena, CA	CA	Western Prelacy	1991	PreK-K	39	www.tavlianpreschool.org
Saint Gregory's Alfred & Marguerite Hovsepian School	Pasadena, CA	CA	Western Diocese	1984	PreK-8	262	www.hovsepianschool.org
Armenian Mesrobian School	Pico Rivera, CA	CA	Western Prelacy	1965	PreK-12	215	www.mesrobian.org
Ari Guiragos Minassian Armenian School	Santa Ana, CA	CA	Western Prelacy	1986	PreK-6	116	www.agmschool.org

**The Mekhitarist Fathers' Armenian School operated as a PreK-8 up until 2011.
***Sahag Mesrob Armenian Christian School operated as a PreK-12 up until 2011.

The table below lists the closed Armenian schools in the United States.

School	Location	State	Administration	Founded	Closed	Grades	Enrollment at Closing	Website
AGBU Elementary School	Watertown, MA	MA	AGBU	1970	1990s	PreK-6	117	
Armenian Sisters' Academy	Lexington, MA	MA	Armenian Catholic	1979	2015	PreK-8	98	www.asalexington.org
Saint Illuminator's Armenian Day School	Woodside, NY	NY	Eastern Prelacy	1977	2018	PreK-6	23	stilluminatorschool.org
TCA Arshag Dickranian Armenian School	Hollywood, CA	CA	Tekeyan Cultural Association	1981	2015	PreK-12	208	www.dickranianschool.org
AGBU Vatche & Tamar Manoukian High School	Pasadena, CA	CA	AGBU	2006	2020	9-12	168	www.agbumhs.org

== See also ==
- Armenian American
