= Armenian-language schools outside Armenia =

== Armenian Sunday schools ==
- K Tahta Armenian community Sunday school of London (London, UK)
- Veratsnund Armenian Sunday School of Moscow (Moscow, Russia)
- Mesrob Mashtots Sunday School of Perm (Perm, Russia)
- Armat School of Krasnodar (Krasnodar, Russia)

== Armenian K-12 schools ==
- AGBU Manoogian-Demirdjian School (Granada Hills, CA)
- Armenian Mesrobian School (Pico Rivera, CA)
- Rose and Alex Pilibos Armenian School (Los Angeles, CA)
- Holy Martyrs Armenian Elementary and Ferrahian High School (North Hills, Los Angeles, CA)
- TCA Arshag Dickranian Armenian School (Hollywood, Los Angeles, CA) (closed)

== Armenian K-8 schools ==
- Armenian Sisters Academy (Montrose, CA)
- Armenian Sisters Academy (Radnor, PA)
- Krouzian-Zekarian-Vasbouragan Armenian School (San Francisco, CA)
- Chamlian Armenian School (Glendale, CA)
- Hovnanian School (New Milford, NJ)

== Armenian high schools ==
- Melkonian Educational Institute (Cyprus)
- Armenian Public High School Number 104 (located on the former property of Vank Monastery, Tiflis) (Tbilisi, Georgia)

== Armenian colleges and universities ==
The Armenian Virtual College is a new learning institutes of the Armenian General Benevolent Union (AGBU). It gives some certificate programs and credit-bearing courses in Armenian education at the college level. The AVC has three departments: Language, History, and Culture. The programme is available in 5 languages: Armenian (Eastern & Western), English, Russian, French and Spanish.

- (Website)
- Haigazian University (Beirut, Lebanon)
- St. Nersess Armenian Seminary (Armonk, NY USA)

== Armenian Studies Programs at Other Institutions ==
- University of Southern California
- University of California, Los Angeles
- University of California, Berkeley
- University of California, Irvine
- California State University, Northridge
- Glendale Community College
- Harvard University
- University of Michigan
- Oxford University
- University of São Paulo
- Rutgers University
- University of Chicago
