= List of Armenian schools =

== Schools and universities in Armenia ==
List of universities in Armenia:

- American University of Armenia
- Yerevan State University
- Yerevan State Medical University
- Russian-Armenian State University Yerevan, Armenia
- Université Française en Arménie Yerevan, Armenia
- State Engineering University of Armenia Yerevan, Armenia
- Yerevan Physics Institute Yerevan, Armenia
- Yerevan State Academy of Fine Arts Yerevan, Armenia
- Yerevan State Linguistic University Yerevan, Armenia
- National Academy of Sciences of Armenia
- Yerevan State Institute of Economy
- Armenian State Pedagogical University

== Schools outside Armenia ==
=== Armenian elementary schools ===
Greece

*Artaki Kalpakian School AGBU

P.FALIRO - GREECE

- Zavarian Elementary School , (Nikaia-Pireos, Greece)

Turkey

- Ortakoy Tarkmancas Elementary School (Ortakoy, Istanbul, Turkey)
- Aramyan Uncuyan Elementary School (Kadikoy, Istanbul, Turkey)
- Karagozyan Orphanage for Boys and Elementary School (Sisli, Istanbul, Turkey)
- Ferikoy Merametciyan Elementary School (Sisli, Istanbul, Turkey)
- Pangalti Mihitaryan Elementary and High School (Sisli, Istanbul, Turkey)
- Bomonti Mihitaryan Elementary School (Sisli, Istanbul, Turkey)
- Bezciyan Elementary School (Kumkapi, Istanbul, Turkey)
- Anarad Higutyun Elementary School (Kocamustafapasa, Istanbul, Turkey)
- Sahakyan Nunyan Elementary and High School (Kocamustafapasa, Istanbul, Turkey)
- Levon Vartuhyan Elementary School (Topkapi, Istanbul, Turkey)
- Dadyan Elementary School (Bakirkoy, Istanbul, Turkey
- Kalfayan Orhanage for Girls and Elementary School (Uskudar, Istanbul, Turkey)
- Yesilkoy Armenian Elementary School (Yesilkoy, Istanbul, Turkey)
- Esayan Elementary and High School (Beyoglu, Istanbul, Turkey)

Middle East

Lebanon

- Forty Martyrs National Armenian School (Nor Marash, Bourj Hammoud, Lebanon)
- Aksor Kassarjian School (Ashrafieh, Lebanon)
- AGBU Levon G. Nazarian School Horsh Tabet (Sin El Fil, Lebanon)
- Apkarian School (Nor Adana, Bourj Hammoud, Lebanon)

Other Middle East

- Sts. Tarkmanchatz Armenian School of Jerusalem 1929 (Jerusalem)
- Sahagian Armenian School of Aleppo (Aleppo, Syria)
- AGBU Gullabi Gulbenkian School (Damascus, Syria)
- Yuzbashian-Gulbenkian Elementary School (Amman, Jordan)
- École Arménienne Catholique Saint Sahag et Saint Mesrob (Amman, Jordan)
- Nubarian Armenian School (Cairo, Egypt)
- AGBU Marie Manoogian School (Tehran, Iran)
- AGBU Nevart Gulbenkian School (Tehran, Iran)
- http://baghdadarmenianschool.com/ Baghdad United Armenian School (Baghdad, Iraq)

United States

- Ari Guiragos Minassian Armenian School (Santa Ana, CA)
- AGBU Manoogian-Demirdjian School (Canoga Park, CA)
- Armenian Mesrobian Elementary & High School (Pico Rivera, CA)
- Armenian Sisters Academy (Montrose, CA)
- Chamlian Armenian School (Glendale, CA)
- Holy Martyrs Armenian Elementary and Ferrahian High School (North Hills, CA)
- Krouzian-Zekarian-Vasbouragan Armenian School (San Francisco, CA)
- Rose and Alex Pilibos Armenian School (Hollywood, CA)
- TCA Arshag Dickranian Armenian School (Hollywood, CA)
- Charlie Keyan Armenian Community School (Fresno, CA)
- St. Gregory's Alfred & Marguerite Hovsepian School (Pasadena, CA)
- Mekhitarist Fathers' Armenian School (Tujunga, CA)
- Sahag-Mesrob Armenian Christian School (Altadena, CA)
- C & E Merdinian Armenian Evangelical School (Sherman Oaks, CA)
- Armenian Sisters Academy (Boston / Lexington, MA)
- St. Stephens Armenian Elementary School (Watertown, MA)
- St. Illuminator's Armenian Day School (Woodside, NY)
- Holy Martyrs Armenian Day School (Bayside, NY)
- The Hovnanian School (New Milford, NJ)
- Armenian Sisters Academy (Radnor, PA)
- AGBU Alex & Marie Manoogian School (Southfield, MI)
- Taniel Varoujan Armenian School (Glenview, IL)

Canada

- École Arménienne Sourp Hagop (Montreal, Quebec, Canada)
- AGBU École Alex Manoogian (Montreal, Quebec, Canada)
- École Notre-Dame-de-Nareg (Laval, Quebec, Canada)
- A.R.S. Kololian Armenian School (Toronto, Ontario, Canada)
- AGBU Zaroukian School (Toronto, Ontario, Canada)

Europe

- École Barsamian (Nice, France)
- Collège Privé Hamaskaïne (Marseilles, France]
- École Franco-Arménienne Tebrotzassere (Le Raincy, France)
- École Arménienne Markarian-Papazian (Lyon, France)
- École Arménienne Tarkmanchatz (Issy-les-Moulineaux, France)
- École Notre-Dame-du-Sacré-Coeur (Marseille, France)
- École Saint Mesrob (Alfortville, France)
- École Bilingue Hrant Dink (Arnouville-lès-Gonesse, France)
- AGBU Artaki Kalpakian School (Athens, Greece)

Latin America

- Escuela Armenia Sahag Mesrob (Cordoba, Argentina)
- AGBU Instituto Marie Manoogian (Buenos Aires, Argentina)
- Colegio Armenio de Vicente López (Buenos Aires, Argentina)
- Escuela Armenio Argentina N°8 D.E. 9 (Buenos Aires) Public School, named by law in 1968
- Colegio Mekhitarista (Buenos Aires, Argentina)
- Instituto Isaac Backchellian (Buenos Aires, Argentina)
- Instituto Educativo San Gregorio El Iluminador (Buenos Aires, Argentina)
- Colegio Arzruní (Buenos Aires, Argentina)
- Colegio Armenio Jrimian ( Valentin Alsina, Buenos Aires, Argentina)
- AGBU Colegio Nubarian (Montevideo, Uruguay)
- Instituto Educacional Nersesian (Montevideo, Uruguay)
- Esc N° 156 “Armenia” (Montevideo, Uruguay) Public School, named by law in 1965
- Esc N° 16 “República de Armenia” (Salto, Uruguay) Public School, named by law in 1998
- AGBU Paren and Regina Bazarian School (São Paulo, Brazil)
- Pré-escola Gregório Mavian (São Paulo, Brazil)

Australia

- AGBU Alexander Primary School (Sydney, NSW, Australia)
- Galstaun College (Ingleside, NSW, Australia)
- St. Gregory's Armenian School (Beaumont Hills, NSW, Australia)

India

- Armenian College and Philanthropic Academy

=== Armenian intermediate schools ===
- Sahakian Levon Meguerditchian College (Sin el Fil, Lebanon)
- AGBU Boghos K. Garmirian School (Antelias, Lebanon)
- Armenian Evangelical Peter and Elizabeth Torosian School (Amanos, Lebanon)
- Armenian National Haratch-Gulbengian School (Ainjar, Lebanon)
- AGBU Alex & Marie Manoogian School (Southfield, MI)
- AGBU Manoogian-Demirdjian School (Canoga Park, CA)
- Armenian Mesrobian Elementary & High School (Pico Rivera, CA)
- Armenian Sisters Academy (Montrose, CA)
- Armenian Sisters Academy (Radnor, PA)
- Armenian Sisters Academy (Boston / Lexington, MA)
- Chamlian Armenian School (Glendale, CA)
- Holy Martyrs Armenian Elementary and Ferrahian High School (Encino, CA)
- Krouzian-Zekarian-Vasbouragan Armenian School (San Francisco, CA)
- Rose and Alex Pilibos Armenian School (Hollywood, CA)
- TCA Arshag Dickranian Armenian School (Hollywood, CA)
- Collège Privé Hamaskaïne (Marseilles, France]
- École Franco-Arménienne Tebrotzassere (Le Raincy, France)
- St. Gregory's Armenian School (Beaumont Hills, NSW, Australia)
- Mekhitarist Fathers' Armenian School (Tujunga, CA)
- Sahag-Mesrob Armenian Christian School (Pasadena, CA)
- C & E Merdinian Evangelical School (Sherman Oaks, CA)
- Armenian College and Philanthropic Academy (Kolkata, India)

=== Armenian high schools ===
- St. Tarkmanchatz High School (Damascus, Syria)
- Armenian Evangelical Central High School (Ashrafieh, Lebanon)
- Yeprem and Martha Philibosian Armenian Evangelical College (Beirut, Lebanon)
- Armenian Evangelical Secondary School of Anjar (Anjar, Lebanon)
- Sahakian Levon Meguerditchian College (Sin el Fil, Lebanon)
- Sts. Tarkmanchatz Armenian School of Jerusalem 1929 (Jerusalem)
- Levon & Sophia Hagopian Armenian National College (Bourj Hamoud, Beirut-Lebanon)
- Caloust Gulbengian Armenian National College(Ainjar, Lebanon)
- AGBU Alex & Marie Manoogian School (Southfield, MI)
- AGBU The Lazar Najarian - Calouste Gulbenkian Armenian Central High School (Aleppo, Syria)
- AGBU Manoogian-Demirdjian School (Canoga Park, CA)
- AGBU Instituto Marie Manoogian (Buenos Aires, Argentina)
- AGBU Tarouhi-Hovagimian Secondary School Horsh Tabet (Sin El Fil, Lebanon)
- AGBU Vatche and Tamar Manoukian High School (Pasadena, CA)
- Armenian Catholic Mesrobian High School & Technical College (Bourj Hammoud, Lebanon)
- Armenian Mesrobian Elementary & High School (Pico Rivera, CA)
- Holy Martyrs Armenian Elementary and Ferrahian High School (Encino, CA)
- Rose and Alex Pilibos Armenian School (Hollywood, CA)
- TCA Arshag Dickranian Armenian School (Hollywood, CA)
- Hay Azkayin Turian Varjaran - Externato José Bonifácio (São Paulo, Brazil)
- Melkonian Educational Institute (Cyprus)
- Armenian Evangelical Shamlian Tatikian School (Bourj Hammoud, Lebanon)
- Armenian Evangelical Central High School (Ashrafieh, Lebanon)
- Armenian Evangelical College (Beirut, Lebanon)
- Armenian Evangelical Secondary School Anjar (Anjar, Lebanon)
- École Arménienne Sourp Hagop (Montreal, Quebec, Canada)
- Collège Privé Hamaskaïne (Marseilles, France]
- Hamazkaine Arshak & Sophie Galstaun School (Ingleside, NSW, Australia)
- Djemaran (Beirut, Lebanon)
- Lycée Nevarte Gulbenkian (Le Raincy, France)
- Getronagan Armenian High School (Karaköy/Istanbul, Turkey)
- Surp Hac High School (Uskudar, Istanbul, Turkey)
- Colegio Jrimian (Buenos Aires, Argentina)http://jrimian.edu.ar/
- Instituto Privado Terizakian (Buenos Aires, Argentina)
- Colegio Mekhitarista (Buenos Aires, Argentina)
- Colegio Arzruní (Buenos Aires, Argentina)
- Alishan School (Tehran, Iran)
- Armenian College (Calcutta, India)
- Sahag-Mesrob Armenian Christian School (Pasadena, CA)
- Karen Jeppe Gemaran (Aleppo, Syria)
- Yeghishe Manoukian College (Dbayyeh, Lebanon)
- Melankton & Haig Arslanian Djemaran (Mezher, Lebanon)

=== Armenian colleges and universities ===
- Haigazian University (Beirut, Lebanon)
- Mashdots College (Glendale, CA)

== Virtual schools ==
- Armenian Virtual College of AGBU

== Armenian studies programs ==
- Armenian Research Center University of Michigan - Dearborn, Dearborn, MI
- Armenian Studies UCLA
- Armenian Studies Harvard University
- Armenian Studies Program California State University, Fresno
- Armenian Studies Hebrew University, Jerusalem, Israel
- Armenian University of Oxford, U.K.
- Armenian Studies Program U.C. Berkeley
- Armenian Language and Culture Summer Intensive Course Ca' Foscari University of Venice, Venice, Italy
- USC Institute of Armenian Studies Los Angeles, California
- Section d'arménien de l'Université de Provence à Aix-en-Provence Aix-en-Provence, France
- Études Arméniennes Université de Genève, Geneva, Switzerland
- Arménien Institut National des Langues et Civilisations Orientales (INALCO) Paris, France
- Armenian Studies Courses Glendale Community College, Glendale, California
- Charles K. and Elisabeth M. Kenosian Professor in Modern Armenian History and Literature Boston University
