= World Scholar's Cup =

International team academic program

- Logo displaying the WSC's mascot, the alpaca.
- Type: International Educational Program
- Founded: 2007
- Founder: Daniel Berdichevsky
- Headquarters: Los Angeles, California
- Managing Director: Jeremy Chumley
- Lead Programmer: Tom Brazee
- Director of Curriculum: Josephine Richstad
- Website: http://scholarscup.org

The World Scholar’s Cup (often abbreviated as WSC) is an annual international academic program that features essay writing, debates and quizzes to address real world scenarios. More than 50,000 students from over 67 countries participate every year.

The program was founded by DemiDec in early 2006. The first WSC round took place in South Korea in 2007 at the Hankuk Academy of Foreign Studies.

== Tournament format ==
=== Teams and points system ===
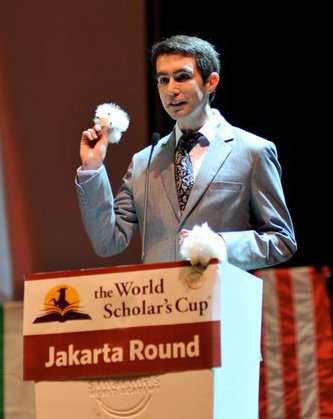
Founder Daniel Berdichevsky showing off the World Scholar's Cup's mascot, the alpaca, at the 2011 regional Jakarta Round.

Each team participating in the World Scholar's Cup is generally composed of three students, from the same school or different schools. Teams of two are permitted but face a scoring disadvantage. Teams within a country or region may participate in any regional round, which usually takes place in a participating school, hall, or both.

=== Age divisions ===
The tournament is divided into junior and senior divisions, with eligibility determined by the ages of team members. Participants who are 14 years of age or older on 1 January of the competition year are classified in the Senior Division. In most regional rounds, all divisions compete separately but concurrently. At Global Rounds, however, events for each division are typically scheduled on different days, with junior division events generally taking place one day before their senior counterparts. Closing ceremonies are also usually conducted separately for each division.

The two main divisions are Senior and Junior. In larger regional and global events, scholars may be divided into further age groups, such as Cria, Skittles, Lpaca and Super Junior. Additionally, scholars may be divided into different waves, as seen in the Kuala Lumpur Global Rounds in 2024, 2025 and 2026.

== Events ==
Each Regional Round consists of four main events: the Scholar's Challenge, Collaborative Writing, Team Debate, and the Scholar's Bowl. In addition to these four events, non-competitive social activities take place in select tournaments. The academic activities each require knowledge of a curriculum made at the start of each season, which consists of questions about subjects like history, social studies, art and music, literature and media, science and technology, and a special area.

=== Team events ===
Events which are scored for performance are referred to as Team Events. These include the Scholar's Challenge, Team Debate, Scholar's Scavenge and the Debate Showcase. The award for the highest score in the Scholar's Challenge for an event was formerly known as the Asimov Award, but in 2022, it was renamed to the Jac Khor Award in honor of the World Scholar's Cup team member who used to write the questions for the event but passed away during the COVID-19 pandemic. Before the end of the debate, the competing teams are required to give positive and constructive feedback to the opposing team for 90 seconds, before the judge(s) announce a winning team. The winning team will then proceed to a designated room and the non-winning team to a different designated room, where each will face another team with the same number of wins and non-wins (pops). There is no point bonus for winning a debate.

== Curriculum ==
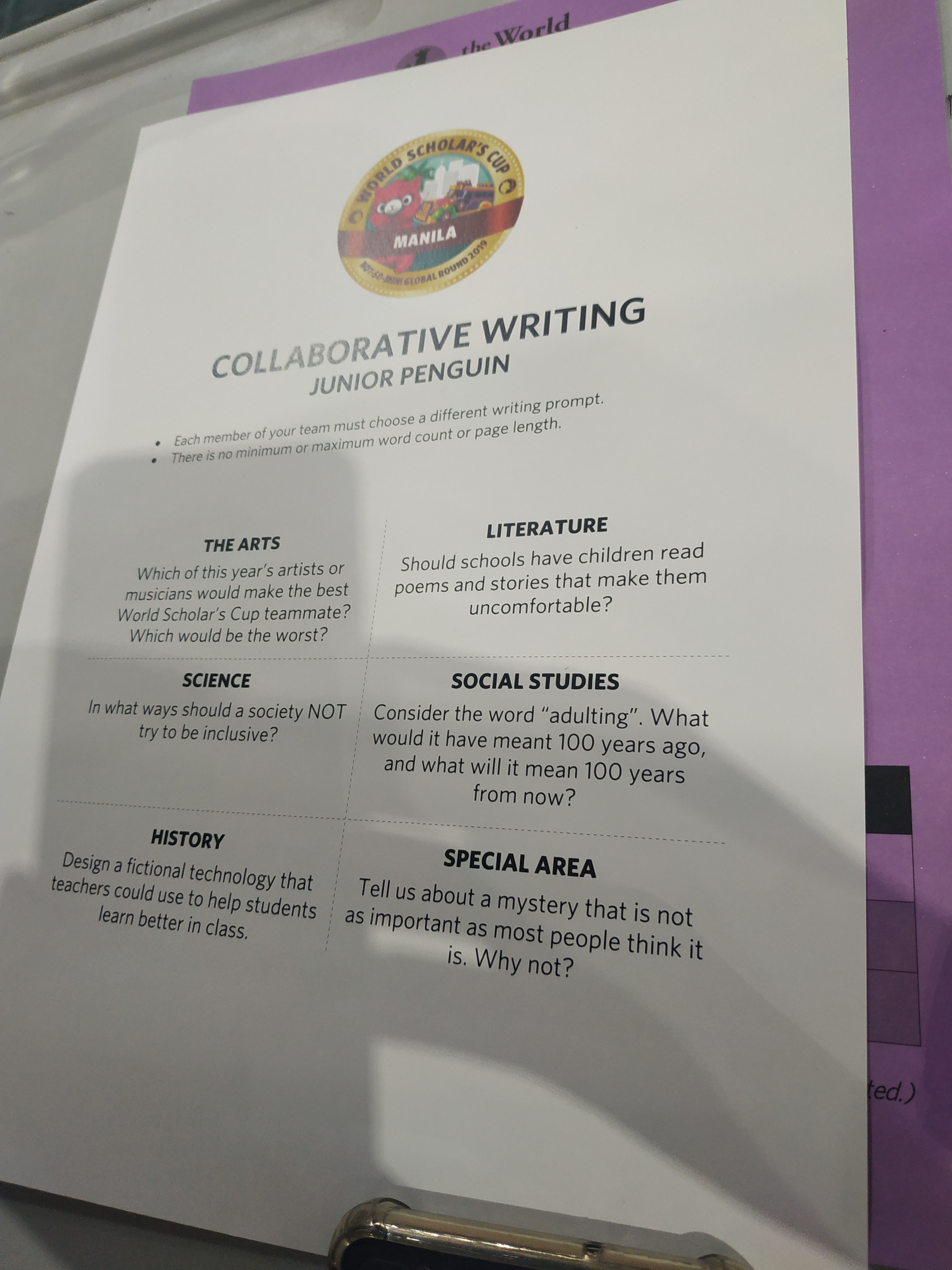
A Collaborative Writing prompt sheet in the Manila Global Round in 2019; students can choose one from the six subjects; however, each teammate must choose a different subject.

The World Scholar's Cup curriculum has six subjects. The theme changes annually. Students are often given questions that require critical thinking skills as well as their basic knowledge to come to a conclusion rather than focusing on memorization. For instance, instead of asking "On which date was an experiment performed?", the question would ask, "Which artist would be most likely to oppose this experiment?"

The subjects are, in order,

- Art & Music
- Social Studies
- History
- Literature & Media
- Science & Technology
- Special Area (custom each year)

Until 2009, mathematics, economics, and trigonometry were included in the curriculum. However, in 2010 it was eliminated in order to better address the goals of the competition since the subjects were considered inflexible and difficult to debate. In 2008, the World Scholar's Cup added a 'film' category to its visual arts section, and in 2010 added a "music" category to its art section.

Until 2013, the World Scholar's Cup released curriculum guides each year—one for each subject. The guides were available free of charge on its official website. Starting in 2013, topic outlines and theme-relevant material were made freely available to students through their website. The World Scholar's Cup recommends connecting each section of the outline to the given theme and how they connect or impact society.

Until 2014, there was a Current Affairs section, which was replaced by Social Studies.

Until 2023, the World Scholar's Cup program organized its syllabus into their 6 main subjects. Currently, the curriculum is listed in one document broken down into non-subject based subsections. The change made categorizing subjects more challenging, however it also allowed for any article to appear in multiple subjects.

In 2025, the World Scholar's Cup briefly removed the history subject in regional rounds in order to transition between 2024 and 2025 content. In its typical fashion, the earliest regional rounds of a year feature the syllabus from the previous year.

== Records ==
The all-time record for the highest individual score was achieved by Sol Swea at the 2019 Penang Regional Round, with a score of 9,116. The highest-ever individual score in the junior division is Thorin Thompson's score of 9,015 at the 2025 Montreal Regional Round. The individual with the most award placements overall is Đào Chi Mai, with 68 award placements between 2015–2019. Đào Chi Mai also has the most award placements in Debate (9), Writing (8), Challenge (34) and Overall (11), above Ethan Wang and Penelope Ortiz (10), Aindra Tan and Dylan Kroft (6).

The team score record was set by Aindra Tan, Lily Zhang, and Stephanie Liu at the 2024 Dalian Global Round, with a score of 35,140.2. The highest Tournament of Champions team score is 34,450.8, set by Aindra Tan, Lily Zhang, and Stephanie Liu in 2024. The all-time highest regional round team score is 34,797, set by Thorin Thompson, Ethan Wang, and Hanson Wu at the 2025 Montreal Regional Round.

The season with the most amount of rounds is the 2019 season, with 156 rounds. The season with the most amount of scholars is the 2025 season, with 59,130 scholars. The 2025 season is also the season with the most amount of countries represented, with 70 countries. The season with the most amount of schools represented is the 2026 season, with 3,346 schools.

The round with the most amount of scholars is the 2018 Kuala Lumpur Global Round, with 4,080 scholars. Houston and Beijing have hosted the most rounds, with both cities hosting 15.

The country that has sent the most scholars is India, with 31,165 scholars sent. India has also won the most award placements in Challenge, with 6,988 award placements. China has won the most award placements in Debate (5,714), Writing (5,787), Bowl (2,719) and Overall (5,739).

The school that has sent the most scholars is Oshwal Academy Nairobi, with 1,897 scholars sent. The school that has participated in the most seasons in GEMS Modern Academy, with 17 seasons between 2009–2026. North London Collegiate School Jeju has the most award placements in Debate (318), Writing (328), Bowl (165) and Overall (311). Tran Dai Nghia High School for the Gifted has the most award placements in Challenge, with 681 award placements.

== Events in China ==
World Scholar's Cup events in China are hosted by ASDAN China, a Chinese subsidiary of ASDAN. Participants are required to apply through a third-party Mini Program in WeChat. Chinese event information as well as results are sometimes not provided on the World Scholar's Cup official website, but instead on ASDAN China's. This has been changed due to the new results page of World Scholar's Cup.

== See also ==
- Mediated intercultural communication
- United States Academic Decathlon
