= DemiDec =

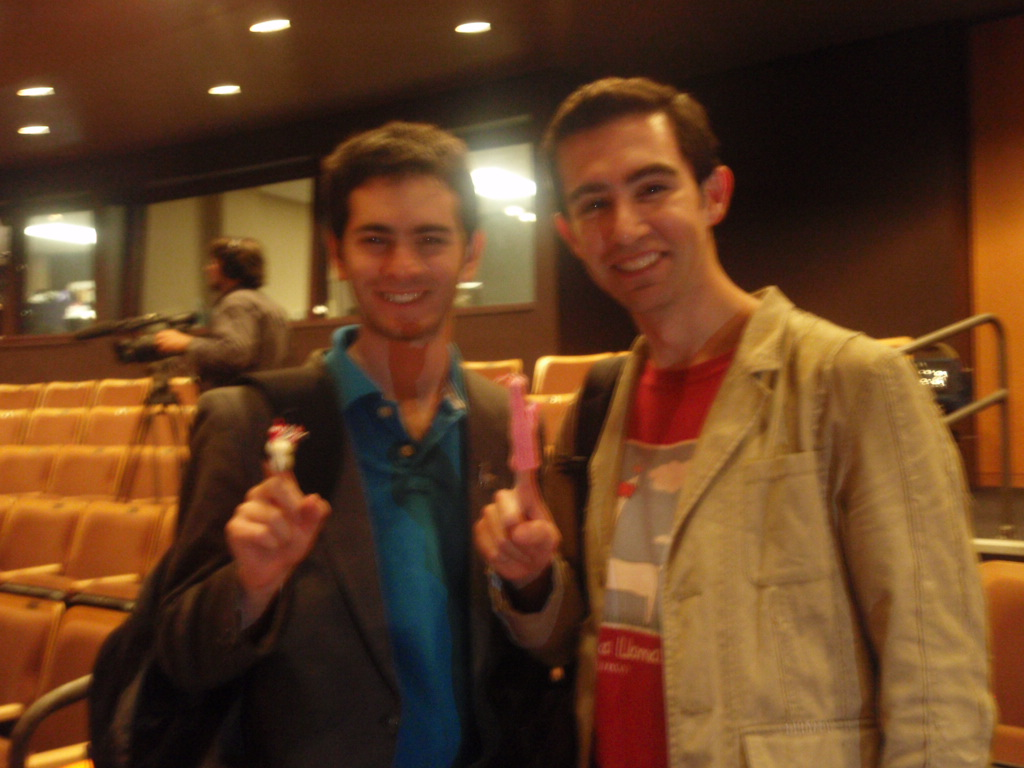
Dean Schaffer (left), a director at DemiDec, along with Daniel Berdichevsky (right) at the 2009 United States Academic Decathlon National Championship

DemiDec Resources produces study materials for participants in the United States Academic Decathlon, hosts the World Scholar's Cup, and co-operates several study academies around the world. A private company, it was founded in 1994 by now-CEO Daniel Berdichevsky.

== History ==
In the 1980s and early 1990s, the United States Academic Decathlon had few third-party companies that produced study materials for students, and individual teams had to do most of the research themselves. After setting an individual scoring record in the 1993–94 season and winning the National Championship, Berdichevsky along with teammate Andrew Salter decided to address this vacuum by creating study guides and practice examinations for the next season.

Berdichevsky had been part of the Taft High School Academic Decathlon program in the 1992–93 season, but had felt "too scared of giving a speech" that year to compete. The following year, he assumed the role of team captain and joined his teammates in winning the National Championship under the leadership of their coach Art Berchin. The individual scoring record Berdichevsky set that year remained unbroken until 2008, when Isabel Salovaara of Whitney Young High School in Illinois earned 9,300 points, surpassing Berdichevsky's record by a small margin of three points.

The study guides and resources Berdichevsky and Salter developed in their first year were limited, but enthusiasm for the venture was evidenced by the fact that it earned $20,000 in 5 months. When their coach Berchin joined them the following year, DemiDec gained more stability and determined to continue the project.

Within two years' time, the company had largely evolved into its current form, relying on "a network of former Decathletes, curriculum experts and experienced writers" to create a study course that includes both content and assessment materials and is known for its student-centered and engaging style. The company annually releases a host of materials for Academic Decathlon competitors and coaches, including "Resource Guides," "Power Guides," "Cram Kits," flashcards, quizzes, and sequenced examinations. The materials are generally released in the summer after having been approved by "Beta testers," usually experienced Decathletes.

== World Scholar's Cup ==
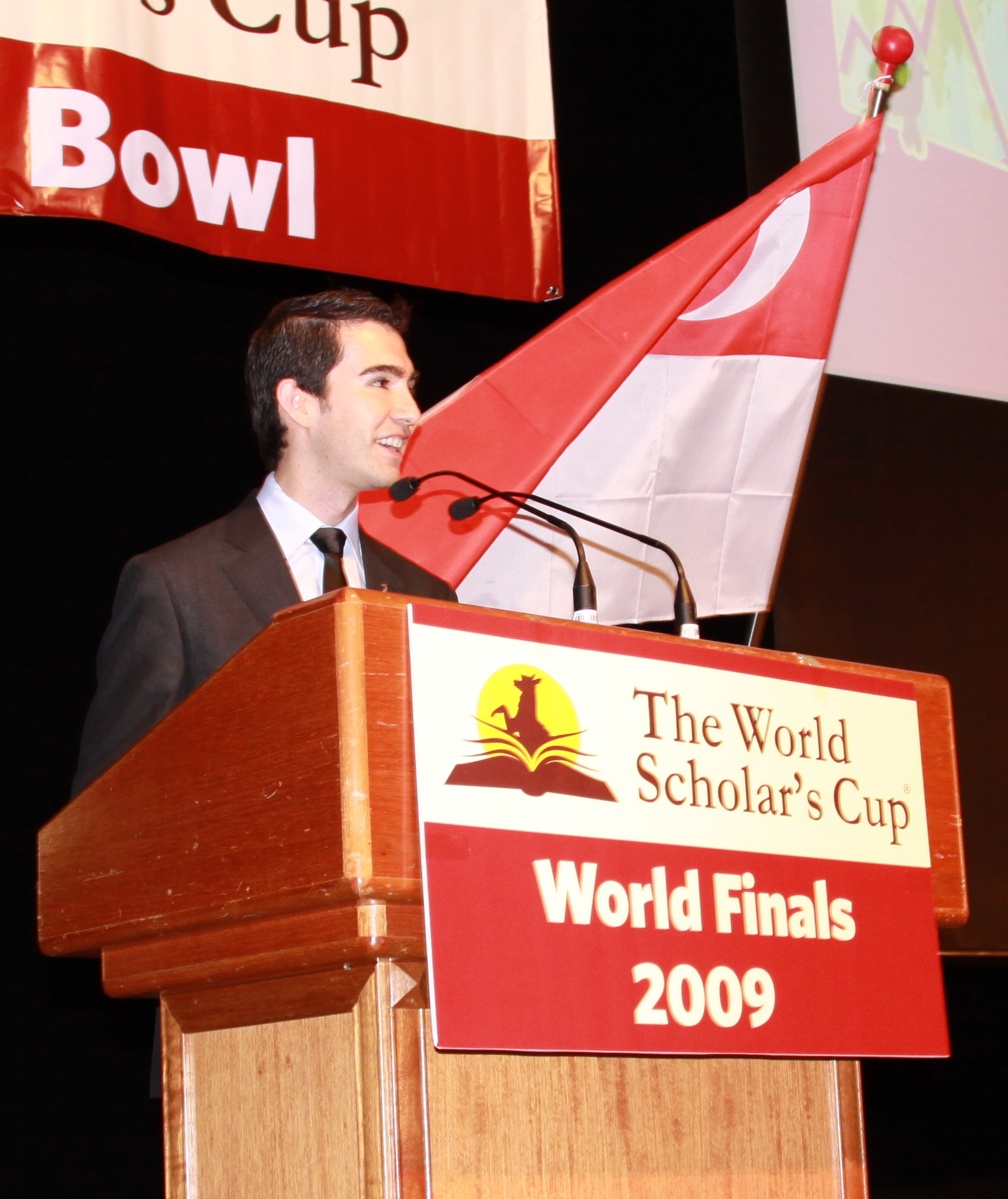
Daniel Berdichevsky speaking at the 2009 World Scholar's Cup finals

In 2006, citing disappointment that the United States Academic Decathlon ended at just a national level, Berdichevsky created the global academic competition the World Scholar's Cup.

The World Scholar's Cup spans six subjects: science, history, literature, art/music, social studies, and a special area. At the competition, students participate in four events that encompass all six subjects: a curriculum-based debate, an essay, a multiple-choice test, and the "Scholar's Bowl," a live tournament in which team members collaborate to answer questions.

Teams consist of either two or three students and can represent their school, multiple schools, or even whole countries. The culmination of the annual competition is held in one of the competing countries. Besides DemiDec, companies that sponsor the World Scholar's Cup include FunnelBrain and iRespond.

== Study Academies ==
DemiDec also operates a number of academies in South Korea. Their programs prepare students in variety of subjects, with a special focus on SAT Preparation for Korean students interested in studying in America.
