= Holy Martyrs Armenian School =

Holy Martyrs Armenian School can refer to:

- Ferrahian Armenian School (includes Holy Martyrs Armenian Elementary School) in Los Angeles
- Holy Martyrs Armenian Day School in Bayside, New York
