= Izabel E. T. de V. Souza =

Izabel E. T. de V. Souza is an Australian-born Brazilian American scholar specializing in intercultural mediation and communication, with a focus on healthcare interpreting and language access. She has served as president of the International Medical Interpreters Association (IMIA) and as secretary general of the International Federation of Translators (FIT). She was also the founder of the National Board of Certification for Medical Interpreters (NBCMI), which developed the first national medical interpreter certification program in the United States.

== Early life and education ==
She earned a Certificate of Translation from the University of Cambridge, a Bachelor's degree in Management from Cambridge College, a Master of Education (M.Ed.), and a Doctor of Philosophy (Ph.D.) from the University of Osaka in Japan, where her doctoral research focused on medical interpreting and intercultural mediation.

== Career ==
In 2007, Souza became executive director of the International Medical Interpreters Association (IMIA) and later served as its president. She also held the position of secretary general of the International Federation of Translators (FIT). She has collaborated with national and international organizations on interpreter education and quality standards. Souza chaired the Health Committee of the National Language Access Coalition and served as project manager for the development of ISO 21998:2020, a standard for healthcare interpreting.

== Research and publications ==
Souza is the author of Intercultural Mediation in Healthcare: From the Professional Medical Interpreters' Perspective (2016), based on a study of more than 400 interpreters from 25 countries. In 2020, she co-edited the Handbook of Research on Medical Interpreting, a collection of international studies in healthcare interpreting. Her peer-reviewed research includes "The Medical Interpreter Mediation Role: Through the Lens of Therapeutic Communication," which examines therapeutic aspects of interpreting.

== Selected works ==
- Intercultural Mediation in Healthcare: From the Professional Medical Interpreters' Perspective (2016)
- Handbook of Research on Medical Interpreting (co-editor, 2020)
- "The Medical Interpreter Mediation Role: Through the Lens of Therapeutic Communication" (peer-reviewed article)
