= Armenian College (Kolkata) =

College in Kolkata, India

Armenian College, Kolkata
- Established: 1821; 205 years ago
- Location: 56b Mirza Ghalib St, Kolkata, India
- Coordinates: 22.55488°N 88.35336°E
- Type: School
- Collection size: Araratian Library (now lost)
- Website: www.armeniancollege.edu.in

Armenian College and Philanthropic Academy (ACPA) is an Armenian school in Kolkata, India. As of 2015, it is the sole Armenian-centred school in the eastern section of the world, and has been so throughout its history. It is commonly known as the Armenian College. It serves students from Class I, until Class X.

== Operations ==
It has no tuition and provides free room and board due to the funds donated by Kolkata-born ethnic Armenian Sir Catchick Paul Chater.

== Student body ==
The majority of the student body originates from the country of Armenia while that year it also had students from Burma (Myanmar), Iran, Iraq, and Russia. As of 2006 Armenians were the majority with a significant number from Iran; two of the students in total were locals from Kolkata and one was from Iraq. many students come to the school to improve their English abilities as the English-language environments of their home countries are not as robust as India's.
