= AGBU Alex and Marie Manoogian School =

American K-12 School

Coordinates: 42°27′15.4″N 83°13′03.7″W

- Armenian: Ալեք Մանուկյան վարժարան

Information
- School type: Charter school
- Established: 1969; 57 years ago
- Employees: c.55
- Grades: K-12
- Enrollment: 400 (2009)
- Affiliation: Armenian General Benevolent Union; Central Michigan University

AGBU Alex and Marie Manoogian School (Armenian: Ալեք Մանուկյան վարժարան) is a charter K-12 Armenian school in Southfield, Michigan in Metro Detroit. It is affiliated with Armenian General Benevolent Union (AGBU).

Central Michigan University is the charter overseer.

== History ==
In 1969 it was established in as a private school. Its initial student body was 20, and it had two teachers. It was named for Alex and Marie Manoogian.

It included a high school program, with the first graduating class in 1978, but suspended its high school in 1991 due to an enrollment decline. In 1995 it became a charter school; that year it had 170 students. At the time Nadya Sarafian was the principal.

The Southfield Observer & Eccentric stated that the school re-established its high school after receiving "overwhelming demand" to do so, with the first new high school class graduating in 2000.

In 1995 and 2001, the Governor of Michigan awarded the school the Golden Apple Award for Academic Excellence. As of 2004 Manoogian had 370 students.

Louise Manoogian Simone and Richard Manoogian, the children of Alex and Marie Manoogian, donated funds for an expansion and renovation in 2004 and later donated additional funds when the project found additional expenses. A new high school facility opened in 2009. As of 2009 it had about 55 employees and more than 400 students.

In 2009 principal Hosep Torossian stated that the school had a budget, almost entirely sourced from funds from the State of Michigan, of fewer than $3,000,000.
