= Alex Pilibos =

Alex Pilibos (Armenian: Ալեքս Փիլիպոս; November 15, 1888 in Kharpert – December 1966, in Fresno) was a prominent philanthropist, businessman, large-scale grower of melons and founder of the Rose and Alex Pilibos Armenian School. He was believed to be one of the largest producers of cantaloupe in California.

== Life ==
Of Armenian descent, Alex Pilibos was born in Kharpert, Mamuret-ul-Aziz Vilayet, Ottoman Empire in 1888. In 1905 Pilibos settled in Fresno, California. Alex Pilibos was asked by his father to buy land in the San Joaquin Valley. After buying land and starting a farm, Pilibos studied engineering at the University of Southern California in Los Angeles. He also attended law school at USC, where his roommate was William Saroyan's uncle Aram Saroyan. Pilibos went into the farming business in the Imperial Valley with partners Arpaxad Setrakian and Harry Karian, both of whom later became large landowners on their own (Karian in the Coachella Valley and Setrakian in the San Joaquin Valley). In the late 1940s, Pilibos and his younger brother Stephen established a successful melon production and packaging company in the Mendota area. His farm was located near El Centro, California and was 400 acres.

The brothers introduced new varieties of melons from seeds they brought from Syria. They developed new packaging for melons and made improvements in both melon varieties and the packaging to meet market demands. Stephen Pilibos, developed grading and sorting machinery to improve the packing process.

He was a committee member of the Western Growers Association.

An avid deep sea fisherman and power boat enthusiast, he maintained a house on Lido Isle, in Newport Beach, Calif.

He died in Fresno, California in 1966.

== Philanthropy ==
Alex Pilibos was a philanthropist who established the Armenian Educational Foundation and also supported the California Armenian Home and Armenian orphanages in Syria, Cyprus and Greece.

After the death of Alex Pilibos, his wife, Rose provided the funds for the establishment of the Rose and Alex Pilibos Armenian School in 1969. His brother Stephen and sister-in-law Lucille have both supported the school.
