= Rose and Alex Pilibos Armenian School =

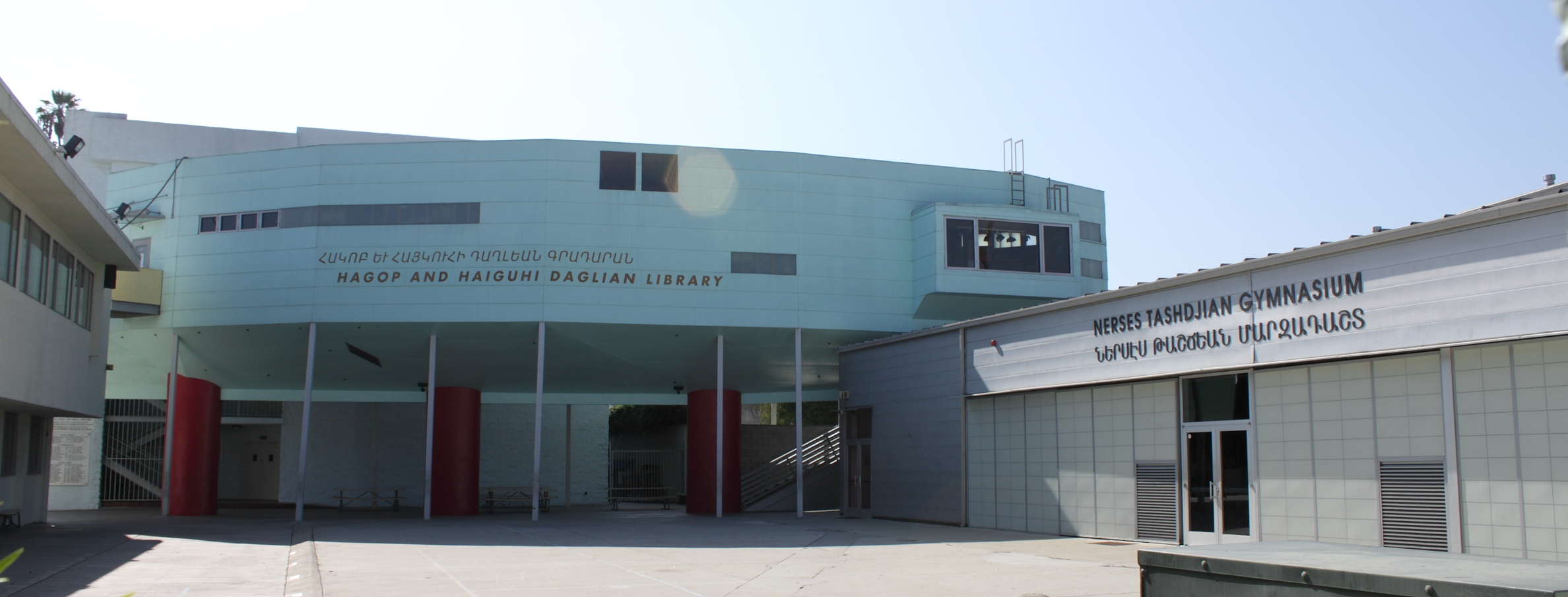

Location
- 1615 North Alexandria Avenue; Los Angeles, United States 90027; 34°6′1.25″N 118°17′55.68″W

Information
- Type: Private
- Established: 1969
- Principal: Dr. Souzy Ohanian
- Enrollment: 801+ students
- Website: www.pilibos.org

Rose and Alex Pilibos Armenian School (Armenian: Լոս Անջելեսի Ռոզ և Ալեքս Փիլիպոս ազգային վարժարան, romanized: Los Anjelesi Rroz yev Alek's P'ilipos azgayin varzharan) is a K-12 Armenian school in the neighborhood of Little Armenia in Los Angeles, California. It was founded by Alex and Rose Pilibos in 1969. History and religion classes are taught in the Armenian language, and the rest of the classes are taught in English. The school is part of St. Garabed Armenian Apostolic Church.

== Notable alumni ==
- Serj Tankian, Daron Malakian and Shavo Odadjian of System of a Down attended the school at different times during the 1970s and '80s
- Sarah Leah Whitson, director of the Middle East and North Africa division of Human Rights Watch.

== Academics ==
The Rose and Alex Pilibos Armenian school, one of several academic institutions under the auspices of the Western Prelacy of the Armenian Apostolic Church of America, is a college-oriented school accredited by the Western Association of Schools and Colleges (WASC).

The school offers Advanced Placement and honors courses, as well as courses certified by the Regents of the University of California. Students at Rose and Alex Pilibos Armenian School are required to maintain a minimum academic standard (delineated below) in order to remain in the student body.

=== New Students ===
Incoming students from other institutions must fulfill the following requirements in order to be accepted to the middle and high school.

- A minimum GPA of 2.0 for the last academic year at the former school.
- Satisfactory performances on a grade-level English language test administered by the school.
- No history of major disciplinary infractions.

==== Probation Policy ====
If, at the end of the semester, a students failing to meet any aspect of the criteria delineated above will be placed on academic probation during the following semester. The student's probationary status will be fully explained to the parents. After the second semester, students failing to achieve the minimum academic criteria required by the school and if retention or other alternatives are deemed inappropriate will not be readmitted to the school.

== Programs ==
=== Athletics ===
Pilibos is a member of CIF (California Interscholastic Federation).

Pilibos offers training and teams in basketball, soccer, volleyball, and track at the elementary, junior high, and high school levels. The school participates with other Armenian schools in the annual KAHAM games, organized by Homenetmen and in various inter-school tournaments with other Armenian and non-Armenian schools.

=== Arts ===
The Rose and Alex Pilibos Art Department provides the opportunity for its Kindergarten to 12th grade students to involve themselves with theatre arts, photography, drawing, sculpting, design, painting, videography, advertising, and many other mediums of expression. The intention of the art program is to continuously develop while introducing creative approaches, perspectives, and techniques to their students.

==== Elementary school ====
Students in each grade take one music class, one performing arts class, and one visual arts class. Some of the various forms of art students are exposed to are:

- Drawing
- Painting
- Collage
- Design
- Sculpting
- Photography
- Theatre
- Music
- Script writing
- Art history
- Armenian History

==== Middle School ====
- Theatre Arts
- Creative Writing
- Speech & Debate
- Design Work 6
- Design Works 7
- Design Works 8

==== High School ====
Sources:

- AP Studio Art
- Visual and Performing Arts

=== Technology ===
At the start of the 2012 – 2013 Academic Year, Pilibos aims to increase the presence and usage of technology in the classrooms to aid in the day to day lessons, more progressive and innovative projects, and collaborative work among students.

==== Elementary school ====
- Keyboarding
- Input/Output Devices
- Graphic Application

==== Middle school ====
- Animation
- Digital Media
- Google Docs
- Programming
- File Management
- Video Game Design
- Web/Graphic Design
- Microsoft Office Suites
- Online Collaborative Tools
- Digital Imaging/Photography
- Digital Citizenship & Acceptable Use Policy
- E-mail & Electronic Communication Etiquette

==== High school ====
- Robotics
- Engineering

=== Extra-Curricular ===
==== Students Clubs ====
Some of the various student organized clubs at Pilibos are:

- Armenian Club
- Book Club
- Chess Club
- Creative Writing Club
- Entrepreneur Club
- Make A Wish Club
- My Artsakh Club
- Philanthropy Club
- Publications' Club
- Rhythm and Poetry Club
- Saving the Sea (Pilibos Chapter)
- Stand Up To Cancer Club

==== Student Academic Organizations ====
- JSA
- Mock Trial
- Model UN
- Academic Pentathlon
- Academic Decathlon

==== Competitions ====
Students at Pilibos are also encouraged to participate in various academic competitions. These include:

- Spelling Bee
- Geography Bee
- Armenian Quiz Bowl
- Science Quiz Bowl
- LA County Science Fair
- CA State Science Fair
- Academic Pentathlon
- Academic Decathlon
- Mock Trial
- Model United Nations
- Junior State of America

=== Community Service ===
The high school curriculum requires that students fulfill 100 hours of community service.

Students participate in various community service activities and organizations, such as:

- Vaghoohas Library Project
- Armenia Orphanage
- Hospitals
- Counselor In Training
- Political/Election Offices
- Armenian National Committee of America
- Armenian Youth Federation

== Gallery ==
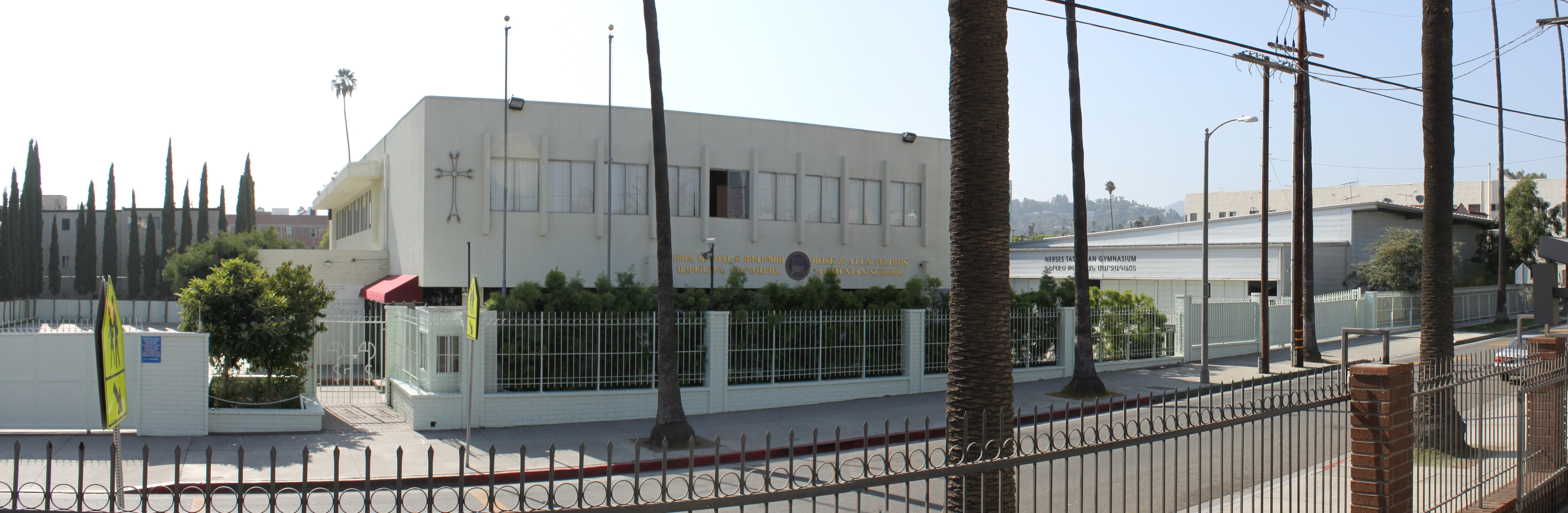
View of the school from Saint Garabed Armenian church

== See also ==
- History of the Armenian Americans in Los Angeles
