= United States Academic Pentathlon =

USAD five subject competition for middle schools

The Academic Pentathlon (USAP) is an academic competition involving five academic fields of study (math, social sciences, science, literature, and fine arts). It is run by the USAD (United States Academic Decathlon). The exact topics involved vary from year to year, but typically include topics from both the sciences and humanities. At the national Academic Pentathlon competitions, schools from both the United States and China compete, but in different divisions. In 2014 and 2015, Austin Academy from Garland, Texas were gold and silver overall in the 8th and 7th grade divisions respectively, and in 2024 both teams won silver. In 2016, Fairmont Private Schools of Anaheim, California, won 1st and 2nd place. In 2017, 2018, and 2019, Rio Calaveras Elementary School from Stockton, California, won gold in both the 7th and 8th grade divisions.

== See also ==
- Academic administration
- Academic Decathlon
- Academic Games
- International Mathematical Olympiad
- International Science Olympiad
