= Armenian Evangelical Central High School =

Location
- Ashrafieh, Beirut; Lebanon; 33.896346869760926°N 35.52783489763718°E

Information
- Type: Private
- Established: 1922
- Principal: Maral Deyirmenjian
- Grades: Kindergarten - Elementary - Secondary
- Religious Affiliation: Armenian Evangelical Church
- Website: http://www.aechs.com

The Armenian Evangelical Central High School (Armenian: Հայ Աւետարանական Կեդրոնական Բարձրագոյն) is an Armenian school in Lebanon. It was founded in 1922 in an Armenian refugee camp and moved ten years later to Ashrafieh, eastern Beirut.
