= Chamlian Armenian School =

Private school in Glendale, California

Coordinates: 34°14′19.12″N 118°15′55.83″W

Location
- 444 Lowel Ave; Glendale, CA 91214

Information
- Other names: Vahan and Anoush Chamlian Armenian School
- School type: Private
- Religious affiliation: Armenian Apostolic Church
- Established: 1975
- Founders: Vahan and Anoush Chamlian
- School district: Glendale Unified School District
- Principal: Talin P. Kargodorian
- Enrollment: 670-700
- Website: www.chamlian.org

Chamlian Armenian School (Armenian: Շամլեան Ազգային Վարժարան) is an Armenian elementary school in Glendale, California. Chamlian Armenian School teaches grades from kindergarten through 8.

== History ==
The school was launched as an Armenian school in 1975. In 1983, it was purchased by husband and wife Vahan and Anoush Chamlian and renamed to Chamlian Armenian School. The school has been fully accredited by WASC since 1983.

Initially the school was offered from 1st to 4th grade. In 1985, the school expanded to 8th grade.

In 1991, Vazken Madenlian was appointed as the principal.

In 2011, the school got approval for the addition of a gymnasium. In 2018, kindergarten was also added.

In 2014, it won approval from the City of Glendale to expand from 500 to 700 students.

Talin P. Kargodorian was appointed to principal in 2014, replacing Vazken Madenlian.

In February 2023, announced the purchase of church and property across the street and plans on expansion of the school. In the same month the school also received a donation of $1.5 million from Baghdassarian Family, who will become the benefactors of pre-school to be built in the newly purchased property.

In April 2026, governor candidate Tony Thurmond visited the school.

== School ==
The classes are taught in English except for the Armenian Language, Armenian History, and Religion classes. It has about 670-700 students.

The school is governed by the Board of Regents of the Western Prelacy of the Armenian Apostolic Church.
