= Sahag-Mesrob Armenian Christian School =

Coordinates: 34.1892°N 118.1292°W

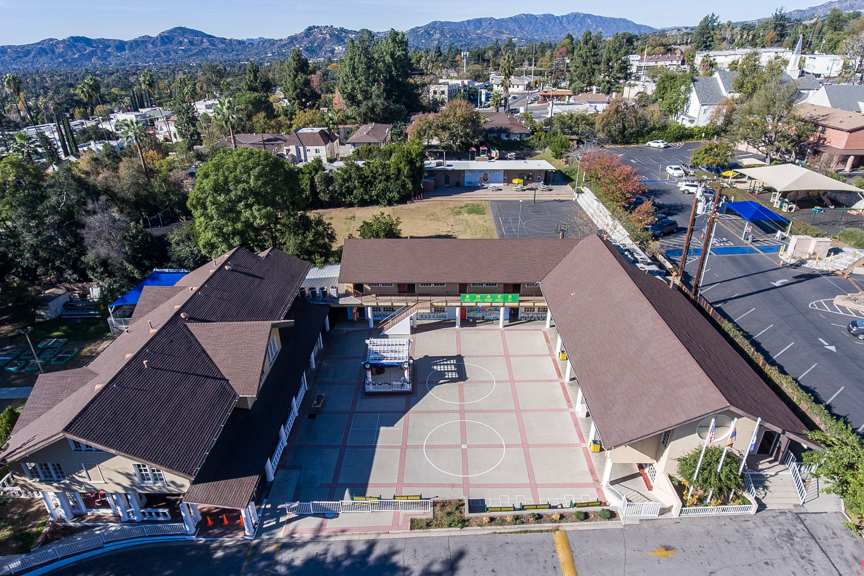
- Sahag-Mesrob Armenian Christian School in 2012

Location
- 2501 Maiden Lane, Altadena, California, United States (temporarily relocated to 2495 East Mountain Street, Pasadena, California United States)

Information
- Type: Private Christian School
- Established: 1980
- Principal: Maral Boyadjian
- Grades: Preschool to 8th grade
- Mascot: Lions
- Website: www.sahagmesrobschool.org

Sahag-Mesrob Armenian Christian School (SMACS) is a private Armenian Christian school currently located in Pasadena, California, after the school’s campus in Altadena, California was destroyed in 2025. Founded in 1980, it provides a Christ-centered education with a focus on Armenian cultural heritage for students from preschool to eighth grade.

== History ==
The school was established in 1980 by a group of concerned Christians recognizing the need for an Armenian Christian institution. Initially located in the basement of a church in Pasadena, the school moved to Altadena in 1983, with significant financial help from John Sheen. In 1987, the school completed the construction of a new building.

In April 2008, Sahag-Mesrob Armenian Christian School purchased the 183–205 East Palm Street property from Bienvenidos Children's Center for $7.1 million with plans to establish a second campus for students in preschool to 5th grade. The school opened the campus in September 2008, but failed to obtain the required Conditional Use Permit (CUP) from the Los Angeles County Department of Regional Planning. This led to complaints from nearby residents, particularly regarding increased traffic, and the school was issued a notice of violation. The school's failure to comply with the permit led to a lawsuit. In June 2009, the school closed the Palm Street campus after facing legal pressure, and it relocated students to other facilities. The property was eventually sold. Meanwhile, the school maintained its original 6th–12th grade campus at Maiden Lane.

On the night of January 7th 2025, the school's entire Altadena campus was destroyed by the Eaton Fire. Students were due to return on January 8th. Despite this, the school community rallied to temporarily relocate to the AGBU Vatche and Tamar Manoukian Cultural Center in Pasadena, which had previously been AGBU Vatche and Tamar Manoukian High School.

== Accreditation ==
Sahag-Mesrob Armenian Christian School is accredited by both the Western Association of Schools and Colleges (WASC) and the Association of Christian Schools International (ACSI).
