= St. Stephen's Armenian Elementary School =

Location
- 47 Nichols Avenue; Watertown, Massachusetts
- 42°22′6″N 71°9′30″W

Information
- Religious affiliation: Armenian Apostolic
- Established: 1985
- Principal: Dr. Garine Palandjian (2023–Present)
- Enrollment: 150 (2008–2009)
- Colors: Gold, Navy
- Uniform: Pants and Blazer
- Website: http://www.ssaes.org/

St. Stephen's Armenian Elementary School (Armenian: Սուրբ Ստեփանոս հայկական տարրական դպրոց), commonly known as SSAES, is a private, bilingual, coeducational elementary school located at 47 Nichols Avenue in Watertown, Massachusetts. Founded in 1984, it is affiliated with the St. Stephen's Armenian Apostolic Church of Greater Boston and is the only Armenian elementary day school in New England. The school serves students from preschool (age 2 years, 9 months) through Grade 5 and is accredited by the Association of Independent Schools in New England (AISNE).

== History ==
The school was founded to provide the Armenian Community of the Greater Boston Area with a place where children could learn to read, write and speak Armenian. The school is associated with the St. Stephen's Armenian Apostolic Church.

Watertown, Massachusetts has historically been home to one of the largest concentrations of Armenian Americans in the United States. Immigration from Armenia and the broader Armenian diaspora accelerated significantly in the 1970s and 1980s following the Lebanese Civil War (1975) and political upheaval in Iran, which caused many Armenian families to resettle in the Greater Boston area.

In response to community demand, St. Stephen's Armenian Elementary School was established in 1984 as a private, non-profit bilingual preschool. Its founding mission was to give the children of the Armenian diaspora an awareness of their language, culture, and heritage while also providing a rigorous American academic education. The school is associated with St. Stephen's Armenian Apostolic Church of Greater Boston and is located within the Armenian Cultural and Educational Center (ACEC) in Watertown.

== Sources ==
- SSAES.org: official school website
- Armenian Weekly: St Stephen's Armenian Elementary School to Celebrate 35 Years (October 22, 2019)
- St. Stephen's Armenian Apostolic Church of Greater Boston: SSAES
- ANCA.org (Armenian National Committee of America) St Stephen's Armenian Elementary School to Celebrate 30 Years (March 22, 2016)
