= United States Academic Decathlon National Championship =

High school academic competition

The United States Academic Decathlon (USAD) is an American academic competition for high school students. The United States Academic Decathlon National Championship, first held in 1982, pits winners at the state level against each other for a national title. The Academic Decathlon consists of 10 events: art, economics, essay, interview, language and literature, math, music, science, social science, and speech. The Super Quiz replaces one of the seven objective events; since 2003, it has alternated between replacing science and social science. The Academic Decathlon requires participation from students of all levels of academic ability; teams generally consist of nine members, who are divided into three divisions based on grade point average: Honors (3.80–4.00 GPA), Scholastic (3.20–3.79 GPA), and Varsity (0.00–3.19 GPA). Though teams consist of nine members (three from each category), only the top two individuals from each category are counted in the final team score. Each student has the possibility of scoring up to 10,000 points, for a combined team score of 60,000.

At the national competition, Schools compete based on size and are divided into three divisions (I, II, and III). However, this separation is only limited to overall team score and overall individual score. Nine overall team medals are awarded: gold, silver and bronze for each division. Similarly, 27 overall individual medals are awarded: gold, silver and bronze for Honors, Scholastic, and Varsity in each division. The rest of the medals—for example, gold in art for Honors, or silver in math for Varsity—are awarded to the top scoring persons regardless of division. In addition, winning teams have often been invited to meet the President of the United States.

In April 1982, the first Nationals was held at Loyola Marymount University in California—16 states and the District of Columbia participated. However, the competition's founder, Dr. Robert Peterson, was inspired by the 1984 Summer Olympics in Los Angeles. He hoped to make Academic Decathlon an international event, and so at the 1984 Nationals, Canada, Mexico, and New Zealand fielded teams in addition to teams from 32 U.S. states. The inclusion of foreign countries did not become a regular occurrence, however. There was no more international participation until 1989, when teams from Northern Ireland and Rio de Janeiro competed. Since then, no more than a few teams a year have competed at Nationals. Since the first national event in 1982, only three states have ever won the National Competition: California, Texas, and Wisconsin, with California having won the majority of the National Competitions. The current National Champion is El Camino Real Charter High School from Woodland Hills, Los Angeles.

In 2006, the small school virtual competition was created for schools with 650 or fewer students. Two years later, the medium school virtual competition was added to accommodate schools with a student population between 650 and 1300. In 2010, the virtual competition was expanded to include large schools by allowing the second-highest performing school in each state to compete in a large school e-Nationals. These contests are held via the internet and as such, the interview and speech events are excluded. The remaining eight tests are completed on the computer and results are submitted electronically to USAD for scoring. Because only the seven multiple choice tests and essay are used, team scores are out of 48,000 points instead of 60,000. Despite it being a virtual competition, winning schools are awarded trophies and medals for their efforts. According to USAD, the goal of the small and medium school competitions is to "enhance learning, growth and recognition" for more schools participating in Academic Decathlon.

== National winners ==
^{†} New team record

Year	Location	Winner School	Score	Notes	Reference
1982	Los Angeles, California	Palo Alto, California	—	The District of Columbia and 17 states participated at the inaugural competition.	
1983	Los Angeles, California	Palo Alto, California	—	—	
1984	Los Angeles, California	J.J. Pearce, Texas	—	This is the first year that drew competitors from other countries. Canada, Mexico, New Zealand and South Korea all participated.	
1985	Los Angeles, California	J.J. Pearce, Texas	46,976	—	
1986	Los Angeles, California	J.J. Pearce, Texas	46,435	—	
1987^{†}	Irving, Texas	John Marshall, California	49,369	Varsity David Florey of John Marshall records an individual score of 8,936 points, the highest score of that year's competition.	
1988	San Antonio, Texas	J.J. Pearce, Texas	46,669	—	
1989	Providence, Rhode Island	W.H. Taft, California	45,857	—	
1990	Des Moines, Iowa	Lake Highlands, Texas	46,627	—	
1991	Los Angeles, California	J.J. Pearce, Texas	48,946	—	
1992	Boise, Idaho	J. Frank Dobie, Texas	49,710	Tyson Rogers, an Honors from Mountain View Mesa, scores 9,100 points and is the first individual to break the 9,000 point barrier.	
1993	Phoenix, Arizona	Plano East, Texas	47,485	—	
1994	Newark, New Jersey	W.H. Taft, California	49,372	—	
1995	Chicago, Illinois	John Marshall, California	49,935	—	
1996	Atlanta, Georgia	J. Frank Dobie, Texas	49,835	—	
1997^{†}	St. George, Utah	James E. Taylor, Texas	52,260	—	
1998	Providence, Rhode Island	El Camino Real, California	52,131	—	
1999	Orange County, California	Moorpark, California	50,225	—	
2000^{†}	San Antonio, Texas	James E. Taylor, Texas	52,470	—	
2001	Anchorage, Alaska	El Camino Real, California	46,547	—	
2002	Phoenix, Arizona	Waukesha West, Wisconsin	48,871	—	
2003	Erie, Pennsylvania	Moorpark, California	51,423.5	—	
2004	Boise, Idaho	El Camino Real, California	50,656.8	—	
2005	Chicago, Illinois	El Camino Real, California	49,009.4	—	
2006	San Antonio, Texas	W.H. Taft, California	51,659.7	—	
2007	Honolulu, Hawaii	El Camino Real, California	52,148.4	—	
2008^{†}	Garden Grove, California	Moorpark, California	53,119.4	Moorpark records the highest team score ever and beats the Wisconsin team, Waukesha West, by 23 points. Additionally, Alli Blonski of Waukesha West scores 9,321, then the highest individual score in the National Competition's history.	
2009	Memphis, Tennessee	Moorpark, California	51,289.5	—	
2010	Omaha, Nebraska	El Camino Real, California	49,951.7	—	
2011	Charlotte, North Carolina	Granada Hills Charter, California	52,113.5	—	
2012^{†}	Albuquerque, New Mexico	Granada Hills Charter, California	54,081	Granada Hills wins for the second year in a row, breaking 54,000 points for the first time. Jimmy Wu of Granada Hills is the first Varsity student to break the 9,000 point barrier. His teammate Sean Wejebe scores 9,441, a new record for the National Competition.	
2013	Minneapolis, Minnesota	Granada Hills Charter, California	51,319.6	Granada Hills wins for the third year in a row. They are the second public school (after JJ Pearce from Richardson, TX in 1984–1986) to win the national title three years in a row.	
2014	Honolulu, Hawaii	El Camino Real, California	52,601.1	El Camino Real's 7th title.	
2015^{†}	Garden Grove, California	Granada Hills Charter, California	53,592.30	Granada Hills's fourth title in five years.	
2016^{†}	Anchorage, Alaska	Granada Hills Charter, California	54,195.1	Granada Hills Charter wins fifth title in six years, and beats all-time record for highest score in the National Championship. Team member Melissa Santos also beats the record for highest individual score in the National Competition, with 9,511.3 points out of 10,000.	
2017^{†}	Madison, Wisconsin	Granada Hills Charter, California	54,507.7	Granada Hills Charter wins sixth title in seven years. Team member Melissa Santos beats her own record for highest individual score in the National Competition, with 9,551.4 points out of 10,000.	
2018^{†}	Frisco, Texas	El Camino Real, California	54,531.1	El Camino Real wins their eighth title with the highest ever team score.	
2019^{†}	Bloomington, Minnesota	Granada Hills Charter, California	53,108.5	Granada Hills Charter High School wins their seventh title.	
2020	Cancelled (Originally Anchorage, Alaska)	N/A	N/A	N/A	
2021	Online (Originally Des Moines, Iowa)	Granada Hills Charter, California	52,656.7	Granada Hills Charter High School wins their eighth title.	
2022	Online (Originally Pittsburgh, Pennsylvania)	Granada Hills Charter, California	52,383.2	Granada Hills Charter High School wins their ninth title.	
2023	Frisco, Texas	El Camino Real, California	49,121.6	El Camino Real wins their ninth title.	
2024	Pittsburgh, Pennsylvania	El Camino Real, California	51,068.4	El Camino Real wins their tenth title.	
2025	Des Moines, Iowa	El Camino Real, California	52,987.3	El Camino Real wins their eleventh title.	
