= Armenian Mesrobian School =

Coordinates: 34.010995°N 118.090698°W

- Pico Rivera, United States

Information
- Type: Private
- Established: 1965
- Enrollment: 239 students
- Website: www.mesrobian.org

The Armenian Mesrobian School is a K-12 Armenian school located in Pico Rivera, California, in the Los Angeles metropolitan area. It is the first Armenian American Institution as it started as a Saturday School in the early 1950's.

The School Board includes parents and community members from the school community. Armenian Mesrobian School is directly tied to the Holy Cross Armenian Apostolic Cathedral in Montebello. The school serves the Armenian community east of Downtown Los Angeles, including those in Pico Rivera, Montebello, Whittier, Pasadena and Orange County.

Mesrobian offers a comprehensive educational program, accredited by the Western Association of Schools and Colleges, to students ranging from early childhood education through twelfth grade. The college preparatory high school classes are certified to the University of California, and honors or Advanced Placement classes are offered in Armenian, English, mathematics, science, and social sciences. Nareg keshishian is the school's principal.

== Academics and curriculum ==
Armenian current events, history, and literature are elements of the classes taught at this school. Current events and history classes are taught in the Armenian language. Even students not of Armenian origins are required to take Armenian classes.

== Athletics ==
Mesrobian Varsity teams have been recognized for their athletic prominence. Mesrobian is a member of the California Interscholastic Federation (CIF) and plays in the International League of the CIF Southern Section. Before joining the International League in 1999, Mesrobian played in the Valley League. Mesrobian has won league championships in boys' and girls' basketball, girls' volleyball, and boys' soccer. Mesrobian, the first Armenian High School in the United States, has won dozens of academic and sportsmanship accolades since its opening in 1965. In fall of 2024, Armenian Mesrobian School had their first Varsity Boys' Basketball Game of the Season against Montebello High in the brand new Gymnasium. On January 23, 2025, Mesrobian saw twin brothers get local and national records in a blowout 119–25 win against Pasadena's Waverly High School with Nicholas Khatchikian scoring 102 points from 48/60 shooting before sitting out with two minutes left in the third quarter (a record previously set by former alumnus and current assistant coach, Tigran Gregorian) and Dylan Khatchikian recording a triple-double without scoring a single point with 35 assists, 15 rebounds, and 13 steals.

The school's physical education program includes Armenian folk dance.

== See also ==
- History of the Armenian Americans in Los Angeles
