= Mediated intercultural communication =

Type of communication

Mediated intercultural communication is digital communication between people of different cultural backgrounds. Media include social networks, blogs and conferencing services. Digital communication is distinct from traditional media, creating new avenues for intercultural communication. User take online classes; post, consume and comment on others content; and play multi-player video games. This creates spaces to form virtual communities that can ease communication across boundaries of space, time and culture.

New media technologies can change culture in positive ways or become a tool of repression.

== History ==
Intercultural communication is as ancient as human movement in search of food sources.

The systematic study of intercultural communication began with Edward Hall's labor at the Foreign Service Institute, and the publication of his The Silent Language (1959). Later research, primarily focused on face-to-face communication in various areas such as interpersonal, group, and organizational and cultural identity.

International and development media have been studied under the umbrella of international communication. Media imperialism, cultural imperialism and dependency theories inform this research.

Mediated intercultural communication examines the bidirectional relationships between media and intercultural communication.
