= Armenian Sisters Academy =

Location
- Upper Merion Township, Pennsylvania, United States (Radnor postal address)
- 40°03′41″N 75°21′13″W

Information
- Type: Private
- Motto: Hye Qyooreroo Varjaran
- Established: 1967
- Head of school: Sr. Emma Moussayan
- Faculty: 20 full-time
- Enrollment: 180 students
- Colors: Blue and Gold
- Website: https://asaphila.org/

The Armenian Sisters Academy (ASA; Armenian: Հայ քույրերի վարժարան) is a Pre-K through eighth grade institution located in the Philadelphia, Pennsylvania suburb of Upper Merion Township, Pennsylvania, with a Radnor postal address. It is in proximity to Radnor Township. Its campus is a former estate.

The name is also shared by two sister schools founded later in Boston and Los Angeles. The Armenian Sisters Academy is run by Sister Emma and Sister Hovanna who teach Armenian and religion classes, while a mostly American faculty teach homeroom classes.

== History ==
In 1963, at the request of Msgr. Stephen Stepanian, then pastor of St. Mark's Armenian Catholic Church in Philadelphia, three nuns, Sister Valentine, Sister Hripsime and Sister Arousiag, were sent from Rome to establish an Armenian day school. All three originated from Lebanon. After four years of preparation, the first Armenian day school on the East Coast was started in a two-room facility, a rowhouse, with an initial enrollment of 16 children, in 1967. The school was initially in Southwest Philadelphia.

The Board of Directors was formed in 1968 made up of Armenian-Americans of the Philadelphia area community. Generous financial and moral support of the Armenian community assisted the Board and the Sisters in their efforts to establish this school. Between 1967 and 1975 a grade was added each year, and the enrollment grew to 165. The school was relocated three times to accommodate its growing needs. At one time it was in Newtown Square.

In October 1975, after eight years of moving from one facility to another, the first students of the new school building moved into the current hilltop campus in the Radnor area. Thanks to the financial generosity of the Philadelphia Armenian community it has been able to keep tuition low in order to provide an education to any Armenian child that desires it. It received an expansion in 2004. In 2005 the Academy doubled in size when it added a new state-of-the-art educational wing and gymnasium. The Radnor location was renamed the Armenian Sisters Academy- Vosbikian Campus in honor of Peter and Irene Vosbikian for their great support of the expansion project and the school itself throughout the years. In 2002 the enrollment was about 225.

In 2012-2013, the school added smartboards to all the classrooms which significantly helped teachers have the resources they needed to maintain the students' education.

The eighth grade class of 2012 visited Armenia as their class trip after graduating, and the eighth grade class of 2014 did the same. These two grades were able to visit many historical Armenian sites and give them a true vision of what they had been learning while at the Academy. By 2012 the enrollment was down to 135. Kristin E. Holmes of The Philadelphia Inquirer wrote that by 2012 area parents were more cautious about spending money and the public schools in the area were considered to be of high quality. It was scheduled to begin a program for children aged 1 1/2-2 1/2 in September 2012. During the 2020 COVID-19 pandemic in Pennsylvania, the school has remained open for in-person classes.

== Curriculum ==
It has a Montessori education curriculum for preschool.

== Demographics ==
People of at least partial Armenian origins, in 2012, were about 90% of the student body.

== See also ==
- List of Armenian schools
