= United States Academic Decathlon =

Annual high school academic competition

- Official logo
- Founded: 1968 as Academic Decathlon; 1981 as USAD
- Founder: Dr. Robert Peterson
- Founded at: Orange County, California
- Type: Non-profit, public-benefit corporation
- Headquarters: Mankato, Minnesota
- Website: www.usad.org

The Academic Decathlon (also called AcDec, AcaDeca or AcaDec) is an annual high school academic competition organized by the non-profit United States Academic Decathlon (USAD). The competition consists of seven objective multiple choice tests, two subjective performance events, and an essay. Academic Decathlon was created by Robert Peterson in 1968 for local schools in Orange County, California, and was expanded nationally in 1981 by Robert Peterson, William Patton, first President of the new USAD Board; and Phillip Bardos, Chairman of the new USAD Board. That year, 17 states and the District of Columbia participated, a number that has grown to include most of the United States and some international schools. In 2015 Academic Decathlon held its first ever International competition in Shanghai, China. Once known as United States Academic Decathlon, on March 1, 2013, it began operating as the Academic Decathlon.

Academic Decathlon is designed to include students from all achievement levels. Teams generally consist of nine members, who are divided into three divisions based on a custom calculated grade point average: Honors (3.8–4.00 GPA), Scholastic (3.20–3.79 GPA), and Varsity (0.00–3.19 GPA). Each team member competes in all ten events against other students in their division, and team scores are calculated using the top two overall individual scores from each team in all three divisions. Gold, silver, and bronze medals are awarded for individual events and for overall scores. To earn a spot at the national competition in April, teams must advance through local, regional, and state competitions, though some levels of competition may be bypassed for smaller states. Online competitions, separated into small, medium, and large categories, are also offered. USAD has expanded to include an International Academic Decathlon and has created an Academic Pentathlon for middle schools.

The ten events require knowledge in art, economics, language and literature, math, music, science and social science. These topics, with the exception of math, are thematically linked each year. One of the multiple choice events, alternating between science and social science, is chosen for the Super Quiz. In addition to the seven objective events, there are three subjective events graded by judges: essay, interview and speech.

Over the years, there have been various small controversies, the most infamous being the scandal involving the Steinmetz High School team, which was caught cheating at the 1995 Illinois state finals. This event was later dramatized in the 2000 film Cheaters. Academic Decathlon has been criticized by educators for the amount of time it requires students to spend on the material, as it constitutes an entire curriculum beyond the one provided by the school. Around the turn of the millennium, several coaches protested the USAD's decision to publish error-ridden Resource Guides rather than provide topics for students to research.

== History ==
Dr. Robert Dea Peterson, left, receives an award from the Orange County Department of Education for the "originality" of the Academic Decathlon concept.

Academic Decathlon was founded in 1968 by Robert Peterson, the superintendent of schools in Orange County, California. Marvin Cobb, the executive director of the California Academic Decathlon in 2003, said after Peterson's death that Peterson intended the competition to encourage not only the highest-level students who already competed in academic competitions ("[adding] a little glory," as President of the Orange County Academic Decathlon Association put it in 1970), but also to "change C students' lives". The inaugural competition, held in December 1968, hosted 103 students from 20 local high schools. At first only regional contests were held, organized by the Orange County Academic Decathlon Corporation (OCAD) with the assistance of the Orange County Department of Education. In 1971, when the grand jury recommended that the Orange County Department of Education should no longer play a part in the competition, full control was handed over to the OCAD.

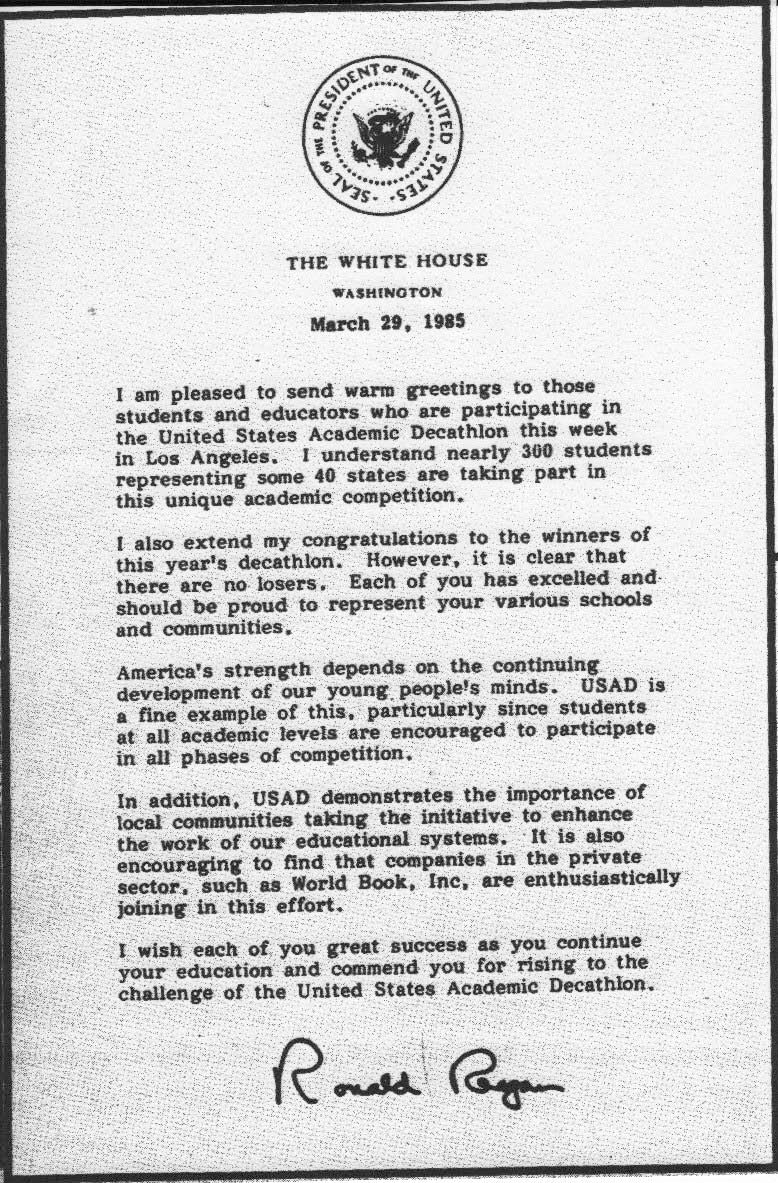
A letter from President Ronald Reagan to the competitors at the 1981 United States Academic Decathlon. Reagan had been Governor of California when Academic Decathlon was originally formed and had met with the winners of the 1970 Orange County Academic Decathlon.

In 1979, the first statewide competition was held, and just over two years later, the newly formed United States Academic Decathlon Association held the first national competition in April 1982 at Loyola Marymount University in California—200 high schools from 16 states and the District of Columbia competed for the chance to attend. Peterson, inspired by the 1984 Summer Olympics in Los Angeles, hoped to make Academic Decathlon an international event. At the 1984 Nationals, 32 states as well as Canada, Mexico, New Zealand and South Korea fielded teams. The inclusion of foreign countries did not become a regular occurrence, however. There was no more international participation until 1989, when teams from Northern Ireland and Rio de Janeiro competed. Since then, only a handful of international schools have competed.

After a 1986 trial competition, Dr. Peterson founded an "International Decathlon for Academics" in 1990. Competitions were held in 1990, 1991 and 1992, but for a number of reasons the competition did not continue. In April 2009, USAD announced that it would be regularly hosting an online international competition, the International Academic Decathlon, after a successful trial event in 2008; however, all 2009 participants but Southbank opted out, leading USAD to issue Southbank an invitation to attend the 2009 U.S. National Competition instead.

Academic Decathlon was originally organized differently than the current competition. The original ten events were aesthetics (music and visual arts), conversation, essay writing, mathematics, practical arts, formal speech, physical science, social science, current events, extracurricular activities, and English literature, grammar, and reading. Over time, those events evolved into: economics, essay, fine arts, interview, language and literature, math, science, social sciences, speech and Super Quiz. It was not until 1998 that fine arts was split into its two constituent tests: art and music. Due to this division, the Super Quiz took the place of one of the other subjects each year. In 1998, Super Quiz replaced economics; from 1999 until 2012, it replaced either science or social science and alternated replacing the two from 2003 to 2012. Beginning with the 2013 season, the Super Quiz consisted of a relay portion only, encompassing questions from the respective year's Science, Language and Literature, Music, Social Science, Art, and Economics curriculum.

More than just the events were changed during the 1998–99 season—the style of study required of students changed. Prior to that season, students had performed their own research for each event, and test writers did not have to base their questions on material USAD published. However, after a policy change at the beginning of the 1999–2000 competition year, test writers were required to base the tests on official USAD materials. After the change in policy, scores vastly increased across the country. That year at Nationals, James E. Taylor High School had the highest team score yet seen at the competition. The following season, USAD once again altered their testing policies; 50% of test questions were to come from USAD published "Resource Guides" and 50% were to come from unspecified sources. Economics focused on business organizations and profiles in individual enterprise rather than macroeconomics and microeconomics as it had for the previous 19 years. A decrease in scores followed these changes; the national winner that year, El Camino Real High School, scored 5,923 fewer points than James E. Taylor High School had the previous year. The following year, USAD settled on an organization of test materials that it would use for almost a full decade, with a mixture of questions from the provided material and independent research. A number of curriculum changes were reversed.

Though the events finally stabilized during the 2000–01 season, the USAD administration changed dramatically that year when the program's executive director, James Alvino, resigned. Alvino had written a religious article that had been included in that year's Super Quiz Resource Guide. His critics and the USAD Board regarded the inclusion as a conflict of interest, as the material was a persuasive essay that heavily pushed Alvino's point of view. The season was also significant in that it was the first year that states were allowed to send both their large and small school champions to the national competition. (Small schools are currently classified as those schools with fewer than 650 students.) However, this practice was short-lived and was discontinued after the 2002 season. Instead, a small school e-Nationals was introduced during the 2005–06 school year. The medium school e-Nationals was established two years later for those schools with between 650 and 1,300 students. In 2010, California Academic Decathlon announced that a large school e-Nationals would be held for the second-highest performing school in each state.

In 2009, USAD announced the launch of an "Online Middle School Pentathlon Program", a competition similar to Academic Decathlon, with only essay, language and literature, mathematics, geography or social science, and science as events. Either science or social science would be designated as the Super Quiz topic.

In 2010, it was announced that high school students who don't have access to a school team or whose team has been eliminated in an earlier round can participate in an online individual competition.

== Participation ==
=== Team makeup and eligibility ===
The USAD requires a diversity of achievement within each team; teams must have students who fall into three categories determined by GPA. The Honors category is composed of students with GPAs between 3.80 and 4.0. The Scholastic category consists of students with GPAs between 3.20 and 3.799. The final group, the Varsity category, contains students whose GPA ranges from 0.00 to 3.19 (effective for the 2020-2021 competition year). USAD uses a modified GPA scale in which performance-based classes such as music, art or physical education are omitted from the GPA calculation. A grade counts for face value regardless of whether it is from an advanced placement, honors, regular or remedial class. An A is counted as a 4.0, a B as a 3.0, a C as a 2.0, a D as a 1.0, and a F as a 0. Only final grades taken from the previous two complete school years are used to calculate GPA.

A team typically consists of nine competitors: three honors, three scholastic and three varsity. However, since only the top two scores from each category count towards the team's total score, a team can compete with as few as six students without any point deduction. Students may compete in a higher category than the one they are assigned to, but generally it is to the students' advantage to compete in the lowest category they can. Scores in Varsity are typically lower than those in Scholastic, and those in Scholastic are typically lower than those in Honors.

=== Levels of competition ===
There are four official levels of competition: local/scrimmage, regional, state, and national (Rounds 1, 2, 3, and 4 respectively). With the exception of Round 1, only the top finishers in each round advance to the next level. California, the state with the largest Academic Decathlon, holds local scrimmages using the Round 1 tests, which are largely for practice and do not determine whether a team can compete at the regional level, which uses Round 2 tests. In the 2008–09 season, 43 states participated in statewide Academic Decathlons, though only 35 and an international school participated in the national competition.

== Events ==
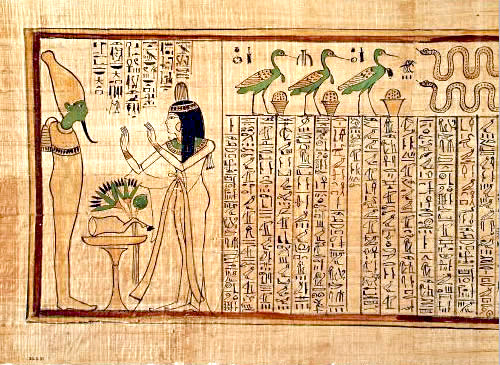
Section from the Book of the Dead of Nany from 2004 to 2005. Students were to learn facts such as the length of the scroll, whom Nany was a singer for, and whom her coffin was a sculpture of.

Like an athletic decathlon, the Academic Decathlon has ten events: art, economics, essay, interview, language and literature, math, music, science, social science, and speech. Prior to 2013, the Super Quiz replaced one of the seven objective events each year; from 2003 to 2012, it alternated between replacing science and social science. USAD releases the topics and theme of the following year's competition in early March, giving students time to prepare for a competition season that runs from November to April. The curriculum is developed by a ten-member panel of former USAD coaches known as the USAD Curriculum Advisory Group. The group contracts with "curriculum developers", who must have at least a bachelor's degree in their respective subject, to create the subject area outlines, Resource Guides, and Notebook Dividers. The Super Quiz Resource Guide was formed mostly from articles from peer reviewed journals, but also includes non-peer reviewed articles, which are looked over by a panel of five reviewers and then checked for accuracy by another reviewer. Use of this format was continued for the Science packet in the 2012–2013 season.

The events are split up into two groups: the seven objective tests (art, economics, language and literature, math, music, science and social science) and the three subjective events (essay (which most often pertains to the annual theme), interview, and speech). In addition, there is a Super Quiz relay event. The former seven are given as half-hour multiple choice tests, whereas the latter three are graded by judges. The multiple choice exams consist of 50 questions each, with the exception of math, which has 35 questions. Beginning in the 2012–2013 season, the Super Quiz written test was dropped and the oral relay was changed to include questions from six of the objective subjects: art, economics, language and literature, music, science, and social science.

=== Objective events ===
In general, the objective events follow a set organizational outline from year to year. Language and literature focuses on a single novel or a set of plays in addition to multiple short literary selections which tend to be poems or excerpts from short stories. The art and music sections include several selections with which students must familiarize themselves in addition to historical information. Economics remains fairly static; 85% of the material focuses on a standard course of macroeconomics and microeconomics and the remaining 15% focuses on the year's topic. For example, in 2005, the themed material covered the economics of ancient Egypt and Rome. Science and social science reflect the season's theme. Unlike the other events, there is no basic information that carries over. The math curriculum has varied as well, occasionally dropping and adding new subjects or shifting the weight of particular subjects.

Year	Theme
1994–1995	Health, Wellness, and Biotechnology
1995–1996	Competition and Cooperation
1996–1997	Communication and Culture
1997–1998	Looking Outward: Forces Shaping Society
1998–1999	Looking Inward: Developing a Sense of Meaning
1999–2000	Looking Forward: Creating the Future
2000–2001	Understanding the Self
2001–2002	Understanding Others
2002–2003	Understanding the Natural World
2003–2004	America: The Growth of a Nation
2004–2005	Exploring the Ancient World
2005–2006	The European Renaissance: Renewal and Reform
2006–2007	China & its Influence on the World
2007–2008	History of the Civil War
2008–2009	Latin America with a focus on Mexico
2009–2010	The French Revolution
2010–2011	The Great Depression
2011–2012	The Age of Empire
2012–2013	Russia
2013–2014	World War I
2014–2015	New Alternatives in Energy: Ingenuity & Innovation
2015–2016	India
2016–2017	World War II
2017–2018	Africa
2018–2019	America in the 1960s
2019–2020	In Sickness and in Health: An Exploration of Illness and Wellness
2020–2021	The Cold War
2021-2022	Water: A Most Essential Resource
2022-2023	The American Revolution and the New Nation
2023–2024	Technology and Humanity
2024-2025	Our Changing Climate
2025–2026	The Roaring Twenties
2026-2027	Journeys of Transformation

==== Super Quiz ====
The format of the Super Quiz differs from that of the other subject areas. Added in 1969, it offers a culminating championship event. The Super Quiz consisted of a forty-question multiple choice test as well as a relay around until 2013. In 2013, the multiple-choice portion was eliminated and the relay portion expanded to include six of the objective subjects. Generally referred to as the Super Quiz Relay, it is the only event viewable by the general public. The relay starts with the Varsity students, followed by the Scholastic and the Honors students. Each group is given 10 or 15 questions, depending on the format decided by the state coordinator. These questions are read aloud to the audience and are printed or projected for the competitors. After the questions and answers are read, the students are allowed seven seconds to select the correct answer. The answer is checked on the spot by a judge and scores are immediately displayed to the audience.

=== Subjective events ===
The subjective events allow students more creativity than the objective events. The speech event is divided into prepared and impromptu sections. A three-and-a-half to four-minute long prepared speech is delivered. The student is then given one minute to read three prompts and deliver a one-and-a-half to two-minute impromptu speech. Example prompts have included: "It has been said about our modern times that, 'Necessity is the mother of invention' Please discuss.", "Math has been described as the universal language. Discuss." and "Why is light, light and dark, dark?" In the interview, the students are asked a wide variety of questions in a formal environment. Questions range from: "Who is your role model?" to "How would you alert someone that their zipper is down?" In both the speech and interview, the competitor is not allowed to reveal his or her school or hometown to ensure neutrality by the judges. In the essay event, students are given 50 minutes to write an essay responding to one of three prompts derived from the language and literature or the Super Quiz curriculum.

=== Themes and topics ===
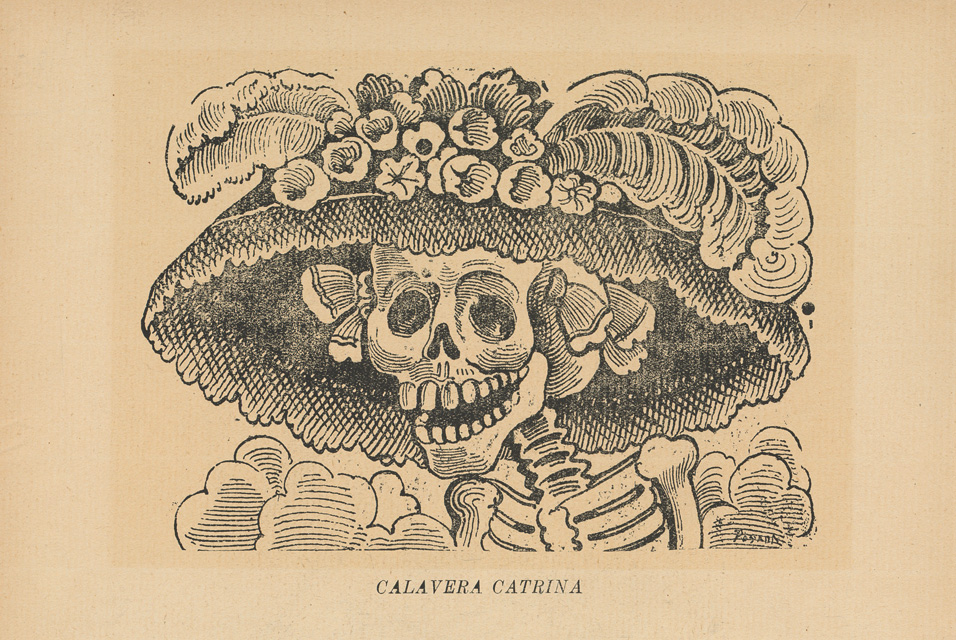
La Calavera Catrina, by José Guadalupe Posada, was one of the selections chosen for the art event during the 2008–2009 competition season.

As the competition has evolved, more of the events have been tied into a central theme. For example, the 2008–2009 theme was "Latin America with a focus on Mexico". Language and literature was based on six short selections of literature as well as the novel Bless Me, Ultima by Rudolfo Anaya. Art focused on the art of Mexico and featured several pieces of work, ranging from Olmec earthenware to José Guadalupe Posada's La Calavera Catrina. The music event included questions on Latin American music and included works by musicians as varied as Manuel de Zumaya, Silvestre Revueltas, Ástor Piazzolla and Xavier Cugat. Social science and economics focused on the history and economy of Mexico respectively. The Super Quiz covered an introduction to evolutionary biology, the historical development of the theory of evolution, natural selection, speciation, mutation, gene flow, genetic drift, and evolutionary developmental biology. Information was also included on Charles Darwin's voyage aboard HMS Beagle.

== Study materials ==
The United States Academic Decathlon publishes a variety of study materials for the objective events, the profits from which support the program. The Resource Guides and the Basic Guides constitute the majority of the USAD corpus. An art reproduction booklet and music CD contain a particular year's relevant pieces and are issued separately from the Resource Guides. Study guides are also published and contain detailed topical outlines for each objective subject. These outlines specifically indicate which topics will require independent research beyond the material included in the Resource Guides. USAD also offered Research Guides until 2010, which outlined the basics of what students ought to research. However, in the 2010–2011 competition season, USAD announced that it would be eliminating independent research-based questions from the competitions.

Resource Guides are offered for the art, economics, language and literature, music, science/social science, and Super Quiz events. The Super Quiz Resource Guide is a compendium of previously published articles, whereas the other Resource Guides are composed by individual writers under contract with USAD. The aim of the Resource Guide is to assist students in their study of the topics listed in the subject area outlines. As an example, in 2003 the music topic was Romantic music. Subsequently, the Music Resource Guide focused on the development of Romantic music, its characteristics and the influence of the Classical era on the Romantic era. A large part of the guide focused on information about that year's composers: Beethoven, Berlioz, Rossini, Chopin, Mendelssohn, Verdi, Mussorgsky, Wagner, Bizet, Brahms, Tchaikovsky, Mahler and Strauss. Similarly, the art topic assigned was Romantic art in the European tradition. The Art Resource Guide included sections detailing the lives and works of relevant artists such as Joseph Mallord William Turner, Claude Monet, Albert Bierstadt, and Camille Pissarro.

In the 1990s, various companies were established to research subjects and provide practice tests to teams. Two of the major ones were Acalon Cards and Exams and DemiDec, formed by former coach Dan Spetner and former Decathlete Daniel Berdichevsky, respectively. The two offer exams and study guides that can augment or replace USAD's official materials. USAD explicitly discouraged teams from ordering materials from third-party companies in the late 1998, though it later removed their discouragement from the curriculum page. USAD republished their discouragement just a few weeks after removing it, but did not publish such a warning in 2002.

In 2000, several coaches who had led their teams to Nationals during the 1990s resigned in protest over Academic Decathlon's decision to sell nearly $1,000 of study materials rather than simply providing topics for students to independently research. Teams felt obligated to buy the guides because USAD based the official tests on them. Teams also denounced the hundreds of errors they found in the official guides; coaches were sometimes forced to instruct their students to deliberately give the wrong answer in the official competition. Richard Golenko, coach of the 1996 J. Frank Dobie High School team that won the national competition, said that the decision to market guides shifted Academic Decathlon's emphasis to memorization over critical thinking. Coach Jim Hatem of Los Angeles and Coach Mark Johnson of El Camino's 1998 winning team fumed over esoteric "trick" questions that USAD had begun asking. James Alvino, USAD's executive director at that time, argued that the expensive study materials were necessary to continue funding nearly 75% of the program's $1,750,000 operating budget and to provide a fairer playing field for less wealthy schools, but did acknowledge that USAD would attempt to reduce prices, remove the more trivial questions, and base smaller portions of the tests on the official Resource Guide.

Basic Guides were formerly issued for students which, unlike the Resource Guides, remained the same from year to year. The Art Basic Guide focuses on art fundamentals, such as the elements of art, principles of composition, and different 2-D and 3-D techniques. Additionally, a brief introduction to art history is included. The Economics Basic Guide reviews fundamental economic concepts in addition to the basics of macroeconomics and microeconomics. The Language and Literature Basic Guide provides students with a basic grounding in the analysis of literature and introduces key terms such as synecdoche, metonymy, assonance, and aphorism. The Math Basic Guide offers a general overview of major topics in high school math, including algebra, geometry, trigonometry, calculus, and statistics. The Music Basic Guide begins by introducing the student to topics in music theory such as harmonics, rhythm, tempo, and the circle of fifths. It also includes information on a wide variety of instruments and a brief history of Western music. However, beginning in the 2010–2011 competition season, the Basic Guides were incorporated into the year's Resource Guides.

The National Association of Secondary School Principals (NASSP) has criticized the intense amount of studying required by students as "excess fact-mongering". In the 1980s, the Association did not endorse Academic Decathlon, citing what it believes was an excessive amount of time involved with the studying necessary to win. It stated that while it is not opposed to the academic portion of the competition, it disliked the "national dimension" of it. However, beginning in 2008, the Association placed USAD on their "National Advisory List of Student Contests and Activities". The list consists of programs that a NASSP committee believes meets their requisite quality standards.

== Scoring and winning ==
Bronze, silver, and gold medals from the e-Nationals competition, which are the same as those of the National competition

Each of the ten events is worth 1,000 points, for a possible 10,000-point individual total. Only the top two scores from the Honors, Scholastic and Varsity divisions are counted for the team score. Until 2013, 60,000 was the maximum possible team score. In 2013, Super Quiz became a 10,000 point event that only counts for the team score, making the maximum possible team score 70,000. With the exception of math and Super Quiz, the objective tests each have 50 questions worth 20 points a piece. The math test is weighted more heavily, with 35 questions worth approximately 28.6 points per question. Until 2013, the Super Quiz written test contained 40 questions, each worth 15 points. Depending on the state director, the relay component of Super Quiz contained either 5 or 10 questions, each worth 80 or 40 points respectively. Starting in 2013, the Super Quiz contained only the relay component with 5 or 10 questions, each worth approximately 333.3 or 166.7 points respectively. The written test was sometimes omitted at the state level even before 2013 if a state director wished to weigh the Super Quiz Relay more heavily. Perfect scores of 1,000 in events are recorded regularly, and there have been cases of dozens of medal winners for a single event because of perfect and near-perfect scores. Gold, silver and bronze medals are awarded in each event and for each division (Honors, Scholastic, and Varsity). All tying participants are awarded medals.

The medals' design is the "AD" portion of the official USAD logo, encircled by "United States" at the top, "Academic Decathlon" at the bottom, and four stars of increasing size on either side. Though the medals are given out only to winners of the competitions, teams can order them along with other study materials. The medals given at state and local competitions are of a different design than those given at Nationals.

The interview and speech events are graded by two to three judges. The scores from the judges are averaged to give a maximum of 1,000 points per event. The essay is graded with a rubric and is read by two different judges whose scores are then averaged. If the difference between the judges' scores differs by 200 points or more, then a third reader is asked to grade the student's essay. The two scores that are closest in value are averaged to give the final score.

A benchmark for the Decathlon elite is obtaining an individual score of over 9,000 points. It was not until 1992, 24 years after the program's inception, that Tyson Rogers achieved this feat at the national competition. Since then, numerous students have broken the 9,000 point barrier. The current highest individual score is 9,707.9, achieved by Hannah Lee from Wakeland High School at the 2019 Texas state competition. State champion scores vary greatly from year to year. As an example, for the 2002–03 season, scores ranged from 24,785 to 49,910 points. National champion scores have been as low as 45,857.0 points and as high as 54,531.2 points. The 54,531.2 score produced by the 2018 El Camino Real Charter High School team at the National Championship stands as the record for the highest team score.

=== Controversies ===
Three days before the 1995 Illinois state competition, Steinmetz High School obtained copies of the tests from the DeVry Institute of Technology, where the state finals were being held. The team was therefore able to look up and memorize the answers. The cheating allowed Steinmetz to beat perennial powerhouse Whitney Young Magnet High School, who had won the Illinois state finals in 22 of the previous 23 years. Six of the twelve students in the nation who scored over 900 points on the math test came from Steinmetz High School, prompting the Illinois state Academic Decathlon to suspect cheating. The Steinmetz team was disqualified after team members refused to take an alternate version of the test, and its coach eventually resigned. The incident was dramatized in the movie Cheaters.

Catholic Memorial High School coach John Burke was at the center of a dispute over the results of the 2003 Wisconsin state final. Confusion arose over a Catholic Memorial student's essay after the results of the competition were released. The essay had only received 390 points out of a possible 1000, and Burke contended that it had been scored improperly. He was well within his rights to contest the score; however, Gerhard Fischer, President of Wisconsin Academic Decathlon, said that the way Burke handled the appeal was "highly questionable" and inflammatory. Though Burke was reprimanded, parents of Catholic Memorial students believed the punishment, a three-year suspension for Burke and a one-year suspension for Catholic Memorial, was due to personality differences between Burke and Wisconsin Academic Decathlon officials. The controversy eventually led to a more thorough investigation of previous issues involving Burke. The Wisconsin Academic Decathlon Board discovered that Burke had previously been accused of "[m]ore than a year of repeated 'attacks' on another school's pupils, including allegations of cheating on tests and ineligibility."

== National championship ==
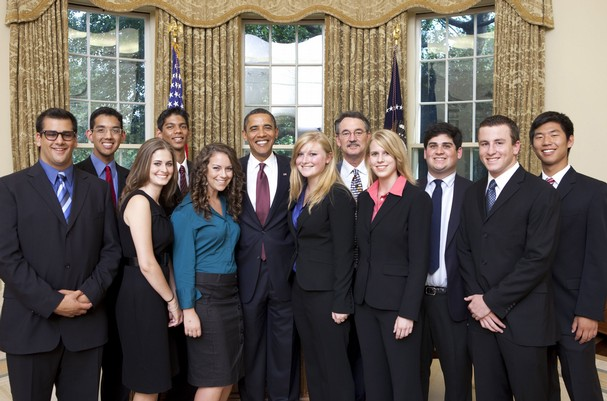
President Barack Obama with the Academic Decathlon team from Moorpark High School, the 2009 National Champions. Winning teams have often been invited to meet the President of the United States.

The National Championship pits the winning school from each state against all the others for an overall title. Occasionally, a number of international schools compete as well. Schools compete based on size and are divided into three divisions (I, II, III, and IV). However, this separation is limited to overall team score and overall individual score. Nine overall team medals are awarded: gold, silver and bronze for each division. Similarly, 27 overall individual medals are awarded: gold, silver and bronze for Honors, Scholastic and Varsity in each division. The top prepared speeches are honored at the Speech Showcase, while the rest of the medals—for example, gold in art for Honors, or silver in math for Varsity—are awarded to the top scoring persons during the awards banquet regardless of division. Other awards given out include the Kristin Caperton Award for overcoming personal or physical challenges, among others. Certain awards occasionally come with monetary prizes; these often vary from year to year. Since the first national event in 1982, all National Championship winners have come from three states: California, Texas and Wisconsin. As of 2024, El Camino Real Charter High School has won 10 national titles.

=== Virtual competition ===
In 2006, the small school virtual competition was created for schools with 650 or fewer students. Two years later, the medium school virtual competition was added to accommodate schools with a student population between 650 and 1,300. These two separate contests are held via the Internet and, as such, the interview and speech events are excluded. The remaining eight tests are completed on the computer and results are submitted electronically to USAD for scoring. Because only the seven multiple choice tests and essay are used, team scores are out of 48,000 points instead of 60,000. Although it is only a virtual competition, winning schools are awarded trophies and medals for their efforts. University High School, from Fresno, California, has won 6 of 7 Small School National Championships. Coached by Sean Canfield, the team has won both the California and National Small School titles for the past 6 years. UHS has a current enrollment of 465 students, yet placed eighth overall at the 2013 California State, competing against schools several times its size. According to USAD, the goal of the small and medium school competitions is to "enhance learning, growth and recognition". In 2010, the United States Academic Decathlon announced the beginning of a large school e-Nationals for the second-highest performing large school in each state.

== In popular culture ==
Depictions of the Academic Decathlon have been featured in some films, including:

- Cheaters, 2000
- Better Luck Tomorrow, 2002
- The Day After Tomorrow, 2004
- High School Musical, 2006
- Spider-Man: Homecoming, 2017
