= AGBU Vatche and Tamar Manoukian High School =

AGBU Vatche & Tamar Manoukian High School

Location
- 2495 East Mountain Street; Pasadena, California 91104; United States
- 34°08′52″N 118°08′40″W

Information
- Type: High School
- Motto: Unmatched Commitment, Unparalleled Success
- Established: 2006
- Closed: 2020
- Oversight: Armenian General Benevolent Union
- Grades: 9–12
- Enrollment: Approx. 150
- Language: English, Armenian
- Sports: Basketball, Volleyball, Soccer
- Mascot: Spartan
- Nickname: Spartans
- Accreditation: Western Association of Schools and Colleges (WASC)
- Newspaper: Corner
- Affiliation: Armenian General Benevolent Union
- Website: www.agbumhs.org

AGBU Vatche and Tamar Manoukian High School (AGBU MHS) was a private Armenian-American high school located in Pasadena, California, United States. Established in September 2006, the school operated under the auspices of the Armenian General Benevolent Union (AGBU), the largest Armenian non-profit organization in the Armenian diaspora. It officially closed in 2020 due to declining enrollment and financial constraints. Although the high school closed, the campus continues to function as an Armenian cultural and community center under AGBU.

The school maintained administrative and academic affiliation with the AGBU Manoogian-Demirdjian School, a college preparatory institution located in the San Fernando Valley region of Los Angeles. The Pasadena campus featured facilities including a science laboratory, library, indoor gymnasium, computer lab, assembly hall, and cafeteria.

== History ==
In the early 2000s, the Armenian General Benevolent Union (AGBU) purchased the former Living Bible Church property in Pasadena, California, with the goal of expanding its educational and cultural programs in the region. The site was developed into a high school campus, and in September 2006, AGBU Pasadena High School officially opened its doors to students.

In 2009, philanthropists Vatche and Tamar Manoukian donated $11 million to the AGBU Pasadena Center and High School. This generous contribution led to the renaming of the school to AGBU Vatche and Tamar Manoukian High School in their honor. The donation also helped enhance the campus infrastructure and support academic and cultural programming.

During the 2013 academic year, the school expanded its curriculum by introducing new electives such as International Issues, Globalization, and Public Policy. Classrooms were upgraded with smartboard technology, and a wider range of student clubs was established to promote engagement and leadership.

The campus featured a theatre, originally part of the former church, which served as the primary venue for theatrical performances and cultural events until 2015. In 2015, AGBU began a major renovation of the theatre, which took four years to complete. In 2019, the renovated theatre was reopened as the Vatche and Tamar Manoukian Performing Arts Center. The extensive renovation included the creation of dressing rooms and the installation of high-tech lighting, transforming the venue into a modern, state-of-the-art facility for a variety of cultural performances and events.

While the opening of the Performing Arts Center enhanced the campus, it is assumed that the significant financial investment required for the renovation, combined with declining enrollment, contributed to the school's closure. However, the exact cause of the closure has not been officially confirmed. In October 2019, AGBU announced that the high school would close at the end of the 2019–2020 academic year and merge its operations with the AGBU Manoogian-Demirdjian School in Canoga Park, Los Angeles.

In 2025, following the Eaton Fire, which destroyed the original Sahag-Mesrob Armenian Christian School campus in Altadena, AGBU reopened its Pasadena campus to temporarily house displaced students. These students continue their education at the AGBU campus while Sahag-Mesrob rebuilds its campus.

Although the high school ceased operations, the campus remains active as a cultural and community center under AGBU to this day, hosting various programs and events that serve the Armenian community and the broader public.

== Closure ==
In October 2019, the Armenian General Benevolent Union (AGBU) announced the closure of AGBU Vatche and Tamar Manoukian High School at the end of the 2019–2020 academic year. The decision was made after extensive consideration of several factors, including declining enrollment and growing financial deficits.

AGBU released an official statement addressing the closure, explaining that despite the best efforts of the school community, enrollment had been stagnant, and demand for private Armenian education had decreased. The school had been heavily subsidized by AGBU and the Manoukian Foundation, with these subsidies growing significantly each year to cover deficits. For the 2019–2020 year alone, these subsidies had reached nearly $2 million, as the $7,980 tuition per student covered only about one-third of the actual cost of $20,000 per student. Despite focused marketing and outreach efforts, the decline in enrollment led to an untenable financial situation.

The statement outlined that the decision to close the high school was made with the best interests of students in mind. AGBU emphasized that the goal was to merge the school with its sister institution, the AGBU Manoogian-Demirdjian School in Canoga Park, Los Angeles. The merger would offer students the same quality education, with MDS providing additional resources, larger class sizes, and more opportunities for advanced coursework, such as AP and Honors classes.

However, the merger with MDS posed challenges for many families, particularly since the majority of students attending MHS were from the Pasadena area. The distance between the two campuses, approximately 30 miles apart, created difficulties for families who would need to commute to Canoga Park. Although AGBU pledged to provide transportation support and financial assistance to ease the transition, the commute was a significant concern for many.

This announcement was met with widespread condemnation from Armenian students across Southern California. Students from the school, joined by peers from other Armenian schools such as St. Gregory A. & M. Hovsepian School and Sahag-Mesrob Armenian Christian School, organized protests both on campus and at the Western Diocese of the Armenian Church. In a powerful demonstration of their commitment to keeping the school open, students organized a boycott of an event on November 5, 2019, where students could learn about other Armenian high school options in Southern California.

Despite these efforts, the school officially closed its doors at the end of the 2019–2020 academic year, with operations merging into the AGBU Manoogian-Demirdjian School in Canoga Park, Los Angeles. However, due to the COVID-19 pandemic, the final school year was abruptly cut short, as in-person classes were canceled and the remainder of the year moved to remote learning.

The closure was a financial necessity due to the increasing demand for financial aid, which AGBU had been meeting, but which added additional strain on resources. The school’s tuition structure, which kept fees affordable for families, was not sufficient to cover operating costs. AGBU committed to subsidizing the tuition difference for current students at MHS and provided transportation support between the two campuses to ease the transition.

Additionally, AGBU took steps to support current students, particularly the juniors, by offering SAT/ACT prep courses and individualized college counseling services at no cost. This effort was part of a broader plan to ensure the academic success of students as they transitioned to MDS or other institutions.

While the campus had already been serving as both a high school and a community and cultural center, AGBU made the decision to focus entirely on its role as a cultural center following the school's closure. The Pasadena campus was home to the recently completed Vatche and Tamar Manoukian Performing Arts Center and had been offering programs and facilities that benefited the broader community, such as cultural events, performances, and classes in Armenian arts, music, and dance.

Despite the emotional challenges this transition posed, AGBU reaffirmed its commitment to supporting students and families during the transition and maintaining the cultural legacy of the school and community.

== See also ==
- History of the Armenian Americans in Los Angeles
