= TCA Arshag Dickranian Armenian School =

Defunct private school in Los Angeles, California

Coordinates: 34.092811°N 118.328383°W

- Los Angeles, United States

Information
- Type: private
- Established: 1981
- Closed: 2015

Tekeyan Cultural Association Arshag Dickranian Armenian School (Armenian: Արշակ Տիգրանյան վարժարան) was a private K-12 Armenian school in Hollywood, Los Angeles, California.

The board of directors announced in 2015 that the school was closing.

== History ==
TCA Arshag Dickranian Armenian School was founded in 1981, by The Tekeyan Cultural Association, Inc. The aims of the founders were to educate Armenian children using the California State Curriculum, teach them the Armenian language and culture, and prepare them for a productive life in the Armenian and American societies.

The school is named after a prominent Armenian-American philanthropist, Arshag Dickranian, whose contributions enhanced the mission and the activities of numerous organizations in Southern California, including the Arshag Dickranian Armenian School in Hollywood.

On the Inauguration Day of September 10, 1981, there were 44 students enrolled from kindergarten through 4th grade. By adding a class each year, TCA Arshag Dickranian School has enjoyed a steady population growth. The school has also expanded its premises over the years and the two most notable expansions are the new building with its various facilities and the new basketball field.

The school's mission is to prepare students for success in a changing and challenging world by offering them a strong value-centered education, instituting a diverse and comprehensive educational program, offering a well-planned curriculum and bringing forth the student's Armenian identity.

In June 1990, the school presented its first High School Graduating Class of 16 students. The graduates of the school have formed an Alumni Association to support their Alma Mater.

TCA Arshag Dickranian School was accredited by The Western Association of Schools and Colleges (WASC) in 2006.

== Profile ==
Located at 1200 North Cahuenga Blvd., Los Angeles, the TCA Arshag Dickranian Armenian School is a federally tax exempt, Pre-K to 12th grade private educational institution.

The school has two main buildings which contain offices, classrooms, modern science labs for seniors and juniors, a library, a gym, an art studio and a music room. The school has a separate playground for the Pre-K and kindergarten grades equipped with a variety of age appropriate toys and play-sets. The school also has an underground parking garage that fits 110 cars, a basketball field and playgrounds, and a private hall called The Walter & Laurel Karabian Hall.

On June 30, 2015, the school permanently closed its doors.

== Governing bodies ==
The Board of Trustees was the governing body of TCA Arshag Dickranian School. Its members were from various aspects of the Armenian community such as educators, professionals, businessmen and scientists. The Board of Trustees Members met regularly, at least once a month, to address the educational and fiscal needs of the school.

== Principal's office ==
The Principal's office managed the day-to-day administration of the school's educational programs such as staff supervision, effective communication with parents and ensuring the proper implementation of the school's curriculum.

The school principal worked collaboratively with The Board of Trustees and The Educational Committee in curriculum and syllabus development, scheduling, personnel management, emergency procedures, extracurricular activities and facility maintenance.

== See also ==
- History of the Armenian Americans in Los Angeles
