= Krouzian-Zekarian-Vasbouragan Armenian School =

- Գռուզեան-Զաքարեան-Վասպուրական Ազգային վարժարան

Location
- 825 Brotherhood Way, San Francisco, CA; 94132; United States; 37°42′50″N 122°28′42″W

Information
- Type: Non-profit independent school
- Motto: Academic excellence in a multilingual, multicultural setting
- Opened: 1980
- Founders: Mr. and Mrs. Krikor Krouzian; Mr. Carl Zekarian; Mr. Hratch Tarpinian
- Sister school: Pailag Papkenian School, Oshagan, Armenia
- School district: San Francisco County
- Grades: Pre K - 8th
- Gender: coed
- Classes offered: English, Math, Science, Armenian, Art, Coding, Physical Education, Music
- Language: English, Armenian
- Colors: Blue and Yellow
- Team name: Van Cats
- Website: KZV Armenian School's website

Krouzian-Zekarian-Vasbouragan Armenian School (Armenian: Գռուզեան-Զաքարեան-Վասպուրական Ազգային վարժարան) is a bi-lingual private K-8 school in San Francisco, California.

The school is the only Armenian school in the San Francisco Bay Area. St. Gregory the Illuminator Armenian Apostolic Church established it in 1980. The primary school opened with grades preschool through one in September; the building construction had finished the previous month. Initially 34 children were enrolled as students. From August 1985 until 1986 Phase II, which added a second floor, was under construction. Hratch Tarpinian donated the funds used to establish the middle school component, called Vasbouragan Middle School. As of 2022 the school had 122 students, with 35 of them in preschool. The school is one of the oldest bilingual schools in the Bay Area and is accredited by the Western Association of Schools and Colleges and has numerous award winning teachers.

Graduates of the school often feed into the highest regarded and most competitive high schools in the Bay Area, and attend universities such as Stanford, UCLA, UC Berkeley, UC San Diego, UC Davis, New York University, Harvard, Cal Poly San Luis Obispo, Pitzer College, Loyola Marymount, UC Irvine, UC Santa Barbara, Johns Hopkins, University of Chicago and others. The alumni are a group of professionals who often continue to support the school while sending their own children there. The school has had numerous guest visitors, including Coach Steve Kerr of the Warriors who was honored at the school's banquet.

The school is named after its founders Mr. Krikor Krouzian, Mr. Carl Zekarian, and Mr. Hratch Tarpinian (who chose to name the school after his birthplace, Van-Vasbouragan, hence the name Krouzian-Zekarian-Vasbouragan Armenian School. The preschool is called the Ovsanna Misserlian Armenian Preschool.

== Victim of Global Attacks ==
KZV became a target for hate crimes as a part of numerous global attacks on Armenians. On July 24, 2020, the Armenian school was vandalized, reported to be incited by the Azerbaijani government. The school's alumni turned this hate crime into an opportunity for unity and stood together. They raised their flag high, danced for peace and covered the front of the school with a banner that read, "Armenians stand against hate."

Two months after it was vandalized, on September 19, 2020, the school's sign was shot at. Officers have been patrolling the area since the anti-Armenian graffiti, but no suspects were located and there were no injuries reported.
