= AGBU Manoogian-Demirdjian School =

Location
- 6844 Oakdale Avenue; Canoga Park, California 91306; United States; 34.1948°N 118.5649°W

Information
- Type: Toddler, Preschool, Kindergarten, Elementary, Middle-High School
- Motto: In Unity is Strength
- Religious affiliation: Armenian Apostolic
- Established: 1976
- Chairman: Mr. Kevork Zoryan
- Principal: Mrs. Anahid Nalbandian (Middle and High School), Mrs. Zepur Shahoian (Elementary), Mrs. Tagoush Khodabakhshian (Preschool)
- Head of school: Mr. David Ghoogasian
- Gender: Co-educational
- Age range: 2-18
- Enrollment: 0
- Average class size: 22
- Classes offered: AP: Biology, World History, Psychology, Chemistry, Environmental Science, US History, English Language, Calculus AB, Calculus BC, US Government, Physics I, English Literature, Computer Science Principles
- Language: English, Armenian
- Hours in school day: 8
- Campus size: 6.28 acres (2.54 ha)
- Colors: Maroon, gold, and white
- Song: Avedis Hayer
- Sports: Basketball, Volleyball, Soccer, Tennis, Golf, Flag Football, Softball, Table Tennis, Cheer-leading
- Mascot: Titan
- Team name: Titans
- Accreditation: Western Association of Schools and Colleges (WASC)
- Yearbook: Yearbook Inc.
- Website: www.agbumds.org

AGBU Manoogian-Demirdjian School (AGBU MDS) is an Armenian-American private school located in Winnetka, Los Angeles, California, United States. Located in the San Fernando Valley, it was founded in 1976 as Saint Peter-AGBU School on the grounds of Saint Peter Armenian Apostolic Church.

The school is run by the Armenian General Benevolent Union (AGBU) and is financed privately through student tuition, donations, fundraising, and other events. Known for its strong emphasis on Armenian heritage and language, AGBU Manoogian-Demirdjian School aims to preserve Armenian cultural identity while offering a rigorous academic program.

== History ==
As the Armenian community grew in Southern California during the quarter-century following World War II, the need for Armenian schools increased. In 1975, AGBU Life President Mr. Alex Manoogian approved the proposal to establish an AGBU-sponsored school in Southern California. A committee formed by AGBU representatives and members of St. Peter Armenian Apostolic Church laid the foundations for the new school, which opened its doors on the grounds of St. Peter Church in February 1976 with 19 students and 3 teachers.

By 1980, student enrollment had grown to 129 students (preschool through 6th grade), and the faculty had expanded to 11. In June 1981, the school awarded elementary school diplomas to its first graduating class of 10 students. Enrollment surged to 230 students the following year, leading to the introduction of middle school grades.

Due to space limitations, the school moved to a vacant public school facility in Canoga Park for the 1982-1983 academic year. In 1986, with an increasing student population, AGBU purchased a 6.3-acre campus at 6844 Oakdale Avenue in Canoga Park, marking the school's permanent home.

In September 1986, the 11th academic year of St. Peter-AGBU School opened with 414 students as a complete Preschool and Elementary through High School educational institution, about to send its first graduates to college.

In 1987, the school was renamed to AGBU Marie Manoogian School in recognition of Mr. Alex Manoogian’s leadership and contributions that made this milestone possible, and in honor of Mr. Manoogian’s spouse, Mrs. Marie Manoogian.

The seven students of the first graduating senior class were awarded high school diplomas in June 1987, and were followed by classes of 8, 11, 18, 24, and 30 graduates between 1987 and 1992.

The Board of Trustees and the Building Committee began to consider options available to expand the physical capacity of the school. Once again, Mr. Alex Manoogian pledged finance and commissioned Detroit architect Mr. Osep Sarraf to come up with a conceptual design. It consisted of a high school building of twenty classrooms, labs, and faculty rooms; a gymnasium-multi-purpose hall and cafeteria structure; and subterranean and surface parking for 200 cars.

Mr. Sarraf's design was developed into working drawings by the architectural firm of Morris Verger and Associates. Construction of the project began on December 29, 1991.

Philanthropists Mr. & Mrs. Sarkis and Seta Demirdjian of Lebanon made a donation of $1.25 million, which, when added to the original construction fund capital of $2.5 million donated by Mr. Alex Manoogian, was sufficient to bring the high school and parking phase of the expansion project to completion before school reopened in September 1992. In recognition of the donation from the Demirdjians, the middle and upper school division was renamed as Sarkis and Seta Demirdjian High School.

In May 1992, the school received full accreditation by the Western Association of Schools and Colleges (WASC).

The last phase of the expansion project, the gymnasium-cafeteria complex, was completed a year later thanks to the one million dollar donation by AGBU donors, the Nazarian brothers (Nazar, Noubar, and Garbis) of New Jersey and Lebanon.

During the following years, the school went through two more expansions. The elementary division was enlarged by a six-classroom building in 1997 to accommodate small class sizes, and the high school building was enlarged with the construction of the Sinanian Annex in 2006, adding nine classrooms and a faculty lounge.

In 1996, the school celebrated its 20th anniversary, and a permanent School Endowment Fund was established through the donation of $100,000 by the Manoogian Family and the fundraising efforts of the Parent Teacher Organization, which raised an additional $100,000. The Endowment Fund stands at $752,745.

The year 2001 marked the silver anniversary of the establishment of the school. By then, the school had over 500 high school graduates, and enrollment stood at 950 students.

The 30th anniversary in 2006 was the occasion of a fundraising effort for a new addition to the preschool facilities. The project was completed during the following year in the presence of major donors Mr. and Mrs. Nazar and Artemis Nazarian, and the preschool was renamed as AGBU Artemis Nazarian Preschool.

The school's 35th anniversary was celebrated in 2011. Thanks to a fundraising effort, all classrooms were equipped with SMART Boards, in addition to Elmo projector units and computers. A project nearing completion was an internal fiber optics network, enabling the use of a school-wide, high-speed network for internet access.

In 2020, AGBU Vatche and Tamar Manoukian High School, the sister school located in Pasadena, California, closed its doors. The students from this campus were transferred to the main campus in Canoga Park.

== Campus Structure ==
AGBU Manoogian-Demirdjian School has several distinct divisions, each with its own name reflecting the diverse educational levels:

Preschool Division: Known as the AGBU Artemis Nazarian Preschool, it was expanded in 2007 with the support of significant donations from Mr. and Mrs. Nazar and Artemis Nazarian.

Elementary Division: Recognized as Marie Manoogian Elementary School, this division serves students from kindergarten to 5th grade. It has grown over the years, including the construction of a six-classroom building in 1997 to accommodate the rising number of students.

Middle and High School Division: Known as Sarkis and Seta Demirdjian Middle and High School, this division offers a complete education from 6th to 12th grade, including a rigorous curriculum that emphasizes Armenian heritage and language.

== See also ==
- History of the Armenian Americans in Los Angeles
