= Ferrahian Armenian School =

Coordinates: 34.167805°N 118.517789°W

Holy Martyrs Ferrahian Armenian School
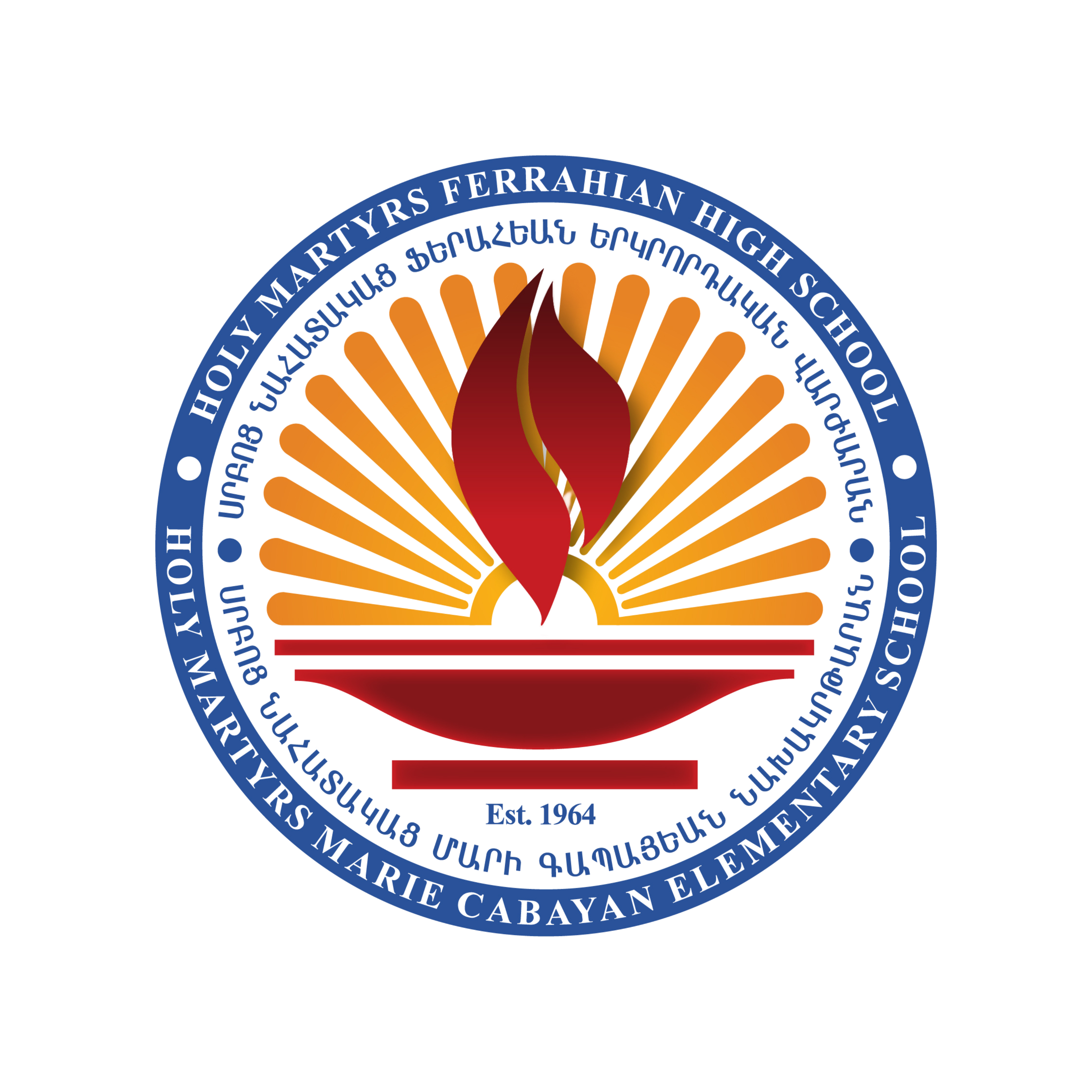

Location
- 5300 White Oak Avenue, Encino, CA 91316 16617 Parthenia Street, North Hills, CA 91343; Encino and North Hills, California, United States

Information
- Type: Private
- Established: 1964
- Head of school: Sossi Shanlian - Ferrahian John Kossakian - Cabayan Vehik Gabrielian - Pilavjian
- Teaching staff: 150
- Enrollment: 1346 students
- Student to teacher ratio: 9:1
- Color
- Athletics: CIF Southern Section
- Mascot: Armens
- Accreditation: Western Association of Schools and Colleges
- Newspaper: Ferrahian Post
- Yearbook: Haghtanag/Յաղթանակ
- Website: https://www.ferrahian.com

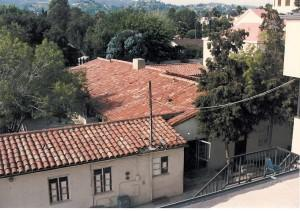

Holy Martyrs Armenian Elementary and Ferrahian High School (Armenian: ՍՐԲՈՑ ՆԱՀԱՏԱԿԱՑ ԱԶԳԱՅԻՆ ՆԱԽԱԿՐԹԱՐԱՆ ՖԵՐԱՀԵԱՆ ԵՐԿՐՈՐԴԱԿԱՆ ՎԱՐԺԱՐԱՆ) is an Armenian-American private school located in the San Fernando Valley of Los Angeles, United States. The school has two campuses: the high school, middle school and main offices, which are located in Encino, and the kindergarten and elementary school, which are located in North Hills. The school is part of the Western Prelacy of Armenian Schools, which seeks to promote bilingual education and cultural growth to the city's Armenian community. Instruction is in Armenian and English. The school is accredited by WASC and earned its most recent six-year accreditation in spring 2025.

Students at Ferrahian High School are encouraged to take advantage of the extracurricular activities available. Some of them include: academic competitions, athletics, student council, student clubs and committees and yearbook editing. The school organizes a yearly trip to Armenia for its junior class.

== History ==
Holy Martyrs Ferrahian School traces its origins to the philanthropic legacy of Mateos Ferrahian, whose bequest laid the foundation for the establishment of the first Armenian high school in the United States. In May 1955, Ferrahian passed away, leaving his residence to be designated for the creation of an Armenian secondary school. His remains were interred at Rosedale Cemetery in Los Angeles.

== Founding and Early Development (1960–1965) ==
In October 1960, the property of Holy Martyrs Armenian Apostolic Church was purchased, aided by an $80,000 donation from Mrs. Satenig Arakelian. On July 17, 1964, the Church Board resolved to establish an Armenian day school on the church premises. The school officially opened on September 14, 1964, with twelve students and Gabriel Injejikian serving as its founding principal. The formal inauguration took place on October 25, 1964, attended by Archbishop Hrant Khachatourian of the Holy See of Cilicia.

In January 1965, the school published its first periodical, Haghtanag, distributing 15,000 copies nationwide. The publication later became the official school yearbook. That same year, the school held its first dinner-dance fundraiser at the Statler Hilton in Los Angeles. To broaden community support, Principal Injejikian traveled extensively across the Midwest, East Coast, and Canada to organize support committees.

== Expansion and Institutionalization (1965–1973) ==
Enrollment increased steadily, reaching forty-three students in the 1965–1966 academic year and sixty-one by the second semester. On November 12, 1965, during the Second Annual Founders Day, Arshag Dickranian—executor of Ferrahian’s will—presented a $235,000 donation, leading to the school’s renaming as Holy Martyrs Ferrahian High School. A permanent endowment fund was established, later divided between Ferrahian School and Mesrobian School in Montebello.

In May 1967, the school’s athletic field was dedicated to Dr. Suren Saroyan. Around this time, the student newspaper Eagle began publication. In January 1968, governance was transferred from the Church Board to an independent Board of Governors, chaired by Dr. Saroyan, who served as president until 1980.

The late 1960s marked significant growth in both finances and programming. The first boys’ basketball team and girls’ cheerleading squad, known as the “Armens,” were established. In April 1969, Khoren I Catholicos visited the school. That June, the school celebrated its first graduating class of seven students.

Between 1969 and 1973, the school expanded its physical footprint through the acquisition of adjacent properties, ultimately totaling approximately 3.5 acres.

== Campus Development and Program Growth (1974–1980) ==
Construction of the school’s first major building wing began in August 1974. The two-story eastern wing was completed and dedicated in May 1976 as the Mihrtad Dickranian Hall, supported by a $25,000 donation from Arshag Dickranian. Further construction followed, including a southern wing with additional classrooms and a library, dedicated in September 1978 in honor of John Garabedian.

By the 1978–1979 academic year, enrollment reached 200 students, supported by a faculty of ten full-time and twenty part-time educators. That same year, the school expanded to include elementary and kindergarten divisions and was renamed Holy Martyrs Armenian Elementary and Ferrahian High School.

Construction concluded in 1979–1980 with the completion of the western and northern wings and the addition of a central gymnasium and hall, dedicated in memory of Arzouman Avedissian through a $100,000 donation from Kevork Arzoumanian.

== Administrative Transitions and Accreditation (1981–1999) ==
In 1981, governance returned to the Holy Martyrs Church Board. The school hosted several notable visits by Catholicos Karekin II, including during its 20th anniversary in 1984. A mortgage-burning ceremony was held in 1987, marking financial milestones.

In 1988, the school acquired a second campus in North Hills, encompassing approximately four acres. Major renovations followed, and by October 1989, upper-grade students relocated to the new campus. After twenty-six years of service, founding principal Gabriel Injejikian resigned in 1990.

The school marked its 25th anniversary in 1990 with the publication of a comprehensive Armenian-language history authored by Anahid Meymarian. During the early 1990s, the school expanded its extracurricular offerings, including Model United Nations and science competitions, reorganized its preschool program, and adopted an official school emblem.

The school began the Western Association of Schools and Colleges (WASC) accreditation process in 1991 and received full accreditation in 1995.

== Modernization and Continued Growth (2000–2015) ==
Throughout the early 2000s, the school underwent further accreditation cycles and administrative development. In 2001, a 5,000-square-foot administrative building was completed and named the Osko and Yeran Karaghossian Building in recognition of their generous donation.

The school celebrated its 40th anniversary in 2004 with a banquet at the Regent Beverly Wilshire Hotel and the release of an updated historical volume. Additional renovations at the North Hills campus were completed in 2005, including new classrooms, a library, and a computer lab. In 2006, the preschool was renamed in honor of Ashkhen Pilavjian.

== Recent History (2016–Present) ==
In 2016, Sossi Shanlian was appointed high school principal at the Encino campus, while John Kossakian continued as elementary school principal at North Hills. The school received renewed WASC accreditation in 2019.

During the COVID-19 pandemic, the school transitioned to full remote learning in March 2020 and resumed hybrid and in-person instruction in April 2021 under public health guidelines.

In April 2022 and May 2024, the school announced significant campus expansions at both the Encino and North Hills locations. In August 2024, Holy Martyrs Ferrahian School began its 60th anniversary year with an enrollment of approximately 1,240 students, becoming the largest pre-university Armenian educational institution in the Armenian diaspora.

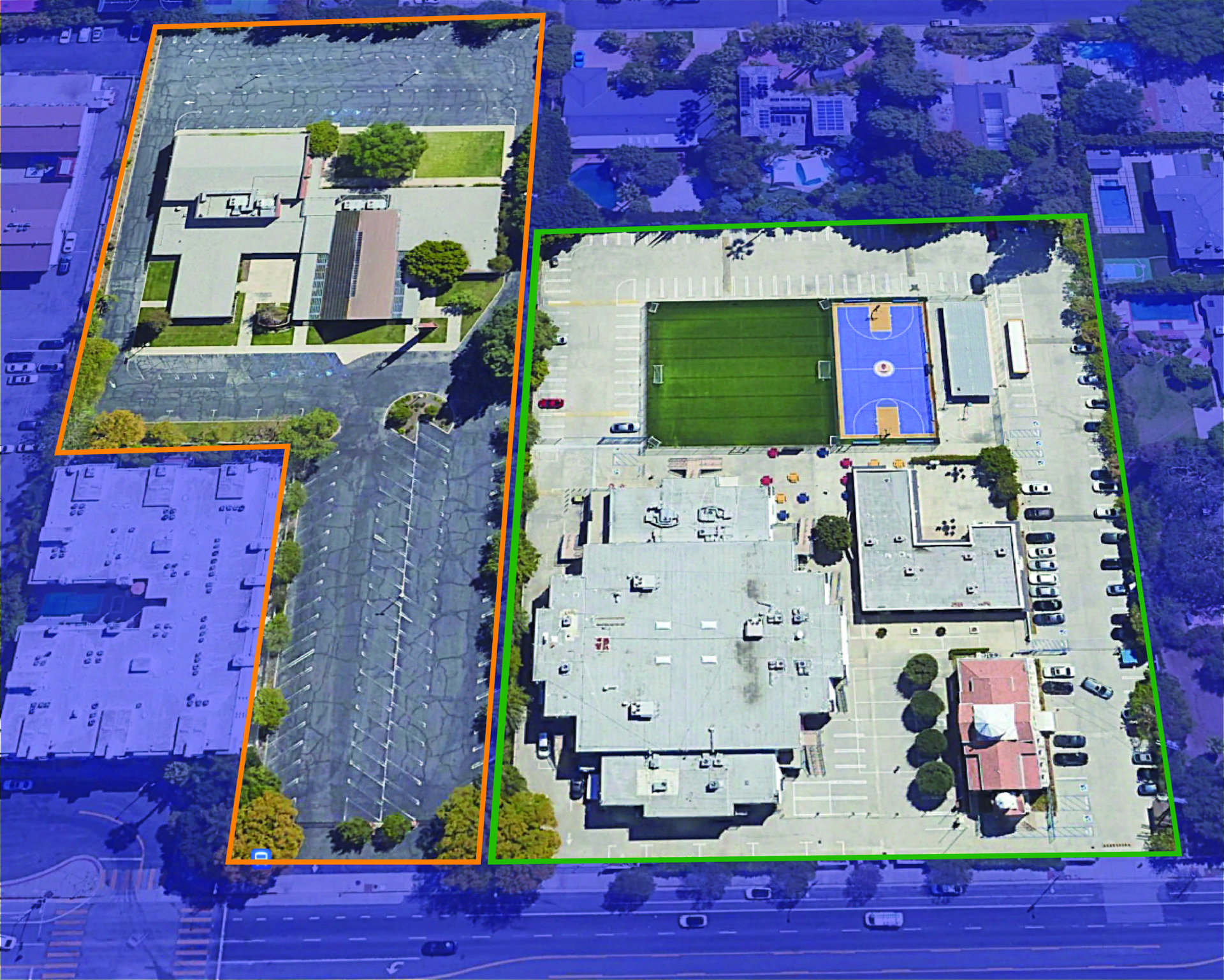

== See also ==
- History of the Armenian Americans in Los Angeles
