= Bolton Hall =

Bolton Hall may refer to:

- Bolton Hall (activist) (1854–1938), American lawyer, author and activist
- Bolton Hall (California), historic American Craftsman era stone building in Tujunga, Los Angeles County, California
- Bolton Hall, North Yorkshire, country house near Preston-under-Scar, Richmondshire, North Yorkshire, England
- Bolton Market Hall, listed building in Bolton, Greater Manchester, England
- Bolton Town Hall, in Bolton, Greater Manchester, England
- Bolton Hall, building on the University of Wisconsin-Milwaukee campus named for historian Herbert Eugene Bolton
