= United Labour =

United Labour or United Labour Party may refer to:

- Grenada United Labour Party, founded in 1950
- South Australian Labor Party, one of South Australia's two major parties, known as the United Labor Party from 1891 until 1917
- United Labour Front, a former political party in Trinidad and Tobago, the main opposition party between 1976 and 1986
- United Labour Party (Armenia)
- United Labor Party (New York), a short lived regional labor political party in New York City that ran in the 1886 New York City mayoral election.
- United Labour Party (New Zealand), an early left-wing political party, representing the more moderate wing of the labour movement
- United Labour Party (Northern Ireland), a minor political party
- United Labour Party (Papua New Guinea)

== See also ==
- Ahdut HaAvoda, a former political party in Israel
- Labour United, a political party in Poland
