= New York Central Labor Union =

Former trade union of the United States

The Central Labor Union of New York, Brooklyn, and New Jersey was an early trade union organization that later broke up into various locals, which are now AFL–CIO members. The establishment of the CLU predates the consolidation of New York City (1897) by nearly two decades and is best known as the organization that created the American Labor Day holiday.

The CLU was established in November 1881, to allow unions in the New York area to coordinate activities.

== Politics ==
Closely linked to the Central Labor Union was the United Labor Party. Henry George was its candidate for Mayor of New York City in 1886 but lost the race by a wide margin.

== See also ==
- Knights of Labor
- May Day
- Peter J. McGuire, 19th century labor leader
- Bolton Hall (activist), opposed War with Spain at Central Labor Union meeting
