= Little Landers =

A little land and a living, SURELY,
is better than desperate struggle and wealth, POSSIBLY.

— Bolton Hall

The Little Landers colonies were attempts at small-scale cooperative agriculture in California, organized by journalist and writer William E. Smythe. The first colony, in San Ysidro, San Diego, California, was inaugurated in early 1909. The colonies were not successful, and by 1925 the last one was almost completely abandoned.

== History ==
Smythe's idea, inspired by Bolton Hall's book, A Little Land and a Living, was that a group of families should have small farms, with one to five acres of land each, and market their produce cooperatively.

The first colony was in the San Diego area. After public meetings, the Little Landers Corporation was incorporated on August 1, 1908. The resulting colony was located on the former Belcher Ranch. It was named San Ysidro, probably after the patron saint of farmers, Isidore the Laborer, and was formally inaugurated on January 11, 1909. It eventually consisted of about 150 acres on the valley floor and 400 on hills. Lack of capital, agricultural knowledge, and water supply caused problems for the colonists, and a new corporation, Little Landers, Incorporated, was formed in December 1910, organized according to the New England town meeting model. By 1912 the colony had about 100 families. In January 1916, there was a flood in the valley floor, destroying many farms and the colony's water pumping plant. A new pumping plant was installed, but the population was much reduced, and Little Landers, Incorporated, was disestablished for failure to pay taxes in 1917. By 1918, the colony was an "evident failure".

Robert C. Hine discusses the Little Landers movement in California's Utopian Colonies (Berkeley, 1953, p. 144-149). Besides San Ysidro, he mentions colonies in the San Fernando Valley, at Runnymede (East Palo Alto), Hayward Heath (Alameda County) and near Cupertino in Santa Clara County. In his account the competition of higher paying war work made a significant impact on these colonies, which otherwise gave some signs of viability. Another colony, called "Los Terrenitos" (English: "The Little Lands"), and established around 1913, was in the valley between the Verdugo and Sierra Madre Mountains, the current site of Tujunga. The soil was rocky and poor for farming. Eventually, most colonists subdivided and sold their lots, and by January 1925 almost all of the original settlers had left.

The last Little Landers colony, called Hayward Heath, was established in the hills above Hayward, California. By the summer of 1916, there were around 60 families of colonists. The soil here was again poor for farming, and the colony was "practically defunct" by 1920. By February 1925 the site of the colony was almost completely abandoned.

== See also ==
- Bolton Hall historical site, operated by the Little Landers Historical Society

32.5528°N 117.0457°W
