= Verdugo Hills Cemetery =

Verdugo Hills of Peace Pioneer Cemetery
- Location within the Los Angeles metropolitan area
- 34°15′42″N 118°17′0″W
- Location: 7000 Parsons Trail, Tujunga, California

History
- Built: 1922

Los Angeles Historic-Cultural Monument
- Designated: 2009
- Reference no.: 948

The Verdugo Hills of Peace Pioneer Cemetery, or Verdugo Hills Cemetery, located in Tujunga, Los Angeles, California, opened in 1922 and closed in 1976.

== History ==
The Los Angeles Office of Historic Resources describes the four-acre cemetery:

Established by Marshall Valentine Hartranft, who also founded the utopian community of Tujunga, the cemetery reflects the early history of its community and holds the remains of many early Tujunga residents. The site is located on hilly terrain, affording a panoramic view of the San Fernando Valley, and is home to several distinctive types of trees.

By the early 1970s the cemetery had fallen into disrepair, according to the Los Angeles Times, and lost its license in 1976.

=== Verdugo Hills Cemetery landslide, 1978 ===
On February 10, 1978, after days of torrential rains, a massive landslide occurred in the San Gabriel Mountains foothills above Tujunga. The result was the unearthing of a large section of the cemetery and corpses being strewn throughout the area. The rain had been pouring into holes made by gophers and saturated the earth. When the slope gave way, rotted caskets broke open, and their contents were carried away.

According to Thomas Noguchi's book Coroner, some 100 bodies were sent plunging into homes, businesses, and city streets. He even states that one such body was wedged into the entrance of a supermarket. The resulting task of trying to identify the remains and rebury them under their correct markers is documented in the book. When they arrived, bodies were everywhere. Some, he states, were "grotesquely standing upright".

The City of Los Angeles repaired the grounds, but heavy rain unearthed more corpses in 1980.

== Restoration ==
Friends of Verdugo Hills Cemetery are volunteering every 3rd Saturday of the month in effort to renew and restore the cemetery.

== See also ==
- List of Los Angeles Historic-Cultural Monuments in the San Fernando Valley
- Bob Ronka, Los Angeles City Council member, 1977–81
