= John Swinton (journalist) =

Scottish-American journalist, newspaper publisher and orator

John Swinton (1829–1901)

John Swinton (1829–1901) was a Scottish-American journalist, newspaper publisher, and orator. Although he arguably gained his greatest influence as the chief editorial writer of The New York Times during the decade of the 1860s, Swinton is best remembered as the namesake of John Swinton's Paper, one of the most prominent American labor newspapers of the 1880s. Swinton would also serve as chief editorialist of the New York Sun during two stints totaling more than a dozen years.

== Biography ==
=== Early years ===
Swinton was born in Saltoun, Scotland, on December 12, 1829. Swinton's father emigrated to America when John was very young, becoming a pioneer settler in the state of Illinois. He died not long after arriving in America, casting his son John into the job market at a very early age.

Swinton became an apprentice to a printer in 1841, when he was just 13 years old. Two years later he moved along, emigrating to Montreal, Lower Canada, where he worked as a journeyman printer. Swinton remained in Canada for the rest of the decade of the 1840s.

Swinton returned to the United States to attend Williston Northampton School in Easthampton, Massachusetts. He did not complete his studies there, instead moving to New York City to enroll at New York Medical College, where once again he did not attain a degree. Swinton was politically radicalized by slavery in the United States and the organized campaign for its abolition. In 1856 he moved to Kansas to participate in the Free Soil movement there, taking a position as manager of the Lawrence Republican, an anti-slavery newspaper.

He later moved to the slave state of South Carolina to take a job as a printing compositor at the state printing office. Swinton secretly taught illegal literacy classes for black South Carolinians in this period.

=== Journalistic career ===
Swinton returned to New York City in 1860, writing an article on medicine for the New York Times which was so well-received that Swinton was offered a post as an editorial writer for the paper. Swinton was no doubt aided in gaining this position by his brother Raymond Swinton, who had joined the Times in 1858 and had himself quickly risen through the managerial ranks. He would remain at the Times for a decade, becoming the chief editorial writer for the paper, including the entire duration of the American Civil War.

From 1870 to 1875, Swinton worked as a free lance journalist, writing extensively for Horace Greeley's New York Tribune.

Swinton became involved in radical labor politics in the spring of 1874, when he addressed a mass meeting at Tompkins Square in New York City — a gathering which was violently dispersed by the police. Swinton's qualities as an effective orator gained notice, however, and in the fall of 1874 he was persuaded to run for Mayor of New York at the top of the ticket of the fledgling Industrial Political Party. Swinton received few votes and saw his candidacy as largely symbolic.

Swinton immersed himself in the New York trade union movement, addressing gatherings of workers and speaking before the New York State Assembly on their behalf. He became active in the affairs of the Cigar Makers' International Union (CMIU) and was instrumental in that union's campaign against the tenement system of cigar production.

Following his stint as a freelancer, Swinton took a permanent position as an editorial writer for the New York Sun in 1875. Before he left the Sun in 1883 to launch a newspaper of his own, he attended a press dinner and allegedly gave what has become his most famous speech today (though he is said to have disputed the account, claiming it was "clumsily reported" and contained no "infamous personal confessions"):

There is no such a thing in America as an independent press, unless it is out in country towns. You are all slaves. You know it, and I know it. There is not one of you who dares to express an honest opinion. If you expressed it, you would know beforehand that it would never appear in print. I am paid $150 for keeping honest opinions out of the paper I am connected with. Others of you are paid similar salaries for doing similar things. If I should allow honest opinions to be printed in one issue of my paper, I would be like Othello before twenty-four hours: my occupation would be gone. The man who would be so foolish as to write honest opinions would be out on the street hunting for another job. The business of a New York journalist is to distort the truth, to lie outright, to pervert, to villify, to fawn at the feet of Mammon, and to sell his country and his race for his daily bread, or for what is about the same — his salary. You know this, and I know it; and what foolery to be toasting an "Independent Press"! We are the tools and vassals of rich men behind the scenes. We are jumping-jacks. They pull the string and we dance. Our time, our talents, our lives, our possibilities, are all the property of other men. We are intellectual prostitutes.

=== John Swinton's Paper ===
The first issue of the eponymous John Swinton's Paper appeared in New York City on October 14, 1883. It was a 4-page broadsheet, split into six vertical columns and appearing once a week. The masthead of each issue declared Swinton's purposes:

1. Boldly upholding the rights of Man in the American Way.
2. Battling against the Accumulating Wrongs of Society and Industry.
3. Striving for the Organization and Interests of Working men and giving the news of the Trades and Unions.
4. Uniting the Political Forces, searching for a common platform, and giving the new of all the Young Bodies in the field.
5. Warning the American people against the treasonable and crushing schemes of Millionaires, Monopolists, and Plutocrats ...
6. Looking toward better times of fair play and Public Welfare.

In this publication, Swinton was free to espouse his own radical ideas about the American labor movement and the publication gained a national readership. Chief among Swinton's targets were the so-called "Robber Barons" of the day, including Jay Gould and William H. Vanderbilt, who were subjected to an unending stream of satirical cartoons, poems, and aggressive editorials. In his pages Swinton opined against the use of exploitative prison labor and contract immigrant labor, casting the perceived menace of Chinese immigration in particularly dark tones.

Swinton's agitation against contract convict labor, launched with a series of articles beginning on October 28, 1883, was credited with moving the New York State Assembly to investigate the issue, culminating in a prohibition of the system in the state beginning in 1885.

Swinton attempted to have a similar effect upon the system of contract immigrant labor. Under this system, imported workers were brought into the country by employers, often to break strikes, and were provided for at a minimum standard of living for a time, saving their money for families at home. Swinton's use of an undercover investigative reporter to reveal the abusive nature of the system in January 1884 resulted in Congressional action on the matter, ending in passage of watered-down amended legislation in 1885. Following passage Swinton continued his crusade against the system, charging the administration of Conservative Democratic President Grover Cleveland with failure to enforce the provisions of the law.

Despite gaining a significant and influential readership in the labor movement, John Swinton's Paper was never a self-supporting business venture. Swinton refused to accept financial gifts for the publication, instead relying exclusively upon subscriptions ($1 per year), newsstand sales (3 cents per copy), and paid advertising (25 cents per column inch). As early as December 1884 losses had begun to mount, a process which accelerated in 1887 when the Knights of Labor began a boycott of the publication over Swinton's perceived antagonism and commitment to the network of rival trade unions which later congealed under the auspices of the American Federation of Labor.

By August 1887, the financial shortfall had become untenable. In his penultimate issue, dated August 7, 1887, Swinton declared that he could no longer subsidize his publication's losses. He wrote:

My means are no longer sufficient to bear any further strain. I have been wrecked by this paper and the labors associated therewith, in which during the past four years, I have sunk tens of thousands of dollars — all of it out of my own pocket.

=== Later life ===
Swinton returned to paid journalism working for others, continuing to maintain a high public profile as an orator on the labor question.

In 1886, Swinton joined the United Labor Party and supported Henry George for mayor of New York City. Following a split between the Georgists and Socialists, Swinton was nominated by the Progressive Labor Party to run for Secretary of State in 1887 against the United Labor candidate (once again Henry George), but declined the nomination and subsequently ran as the Progressive Labor Party's candidate for New York's 7th State Senate district. Swinton made a serious effort to win election in this campaign and received a substantial vote, but was ultimately defeated.

In 1892, Swinton returned to his former position on the editorial staff of the New York Sun, writing editorials for that publication. He would remain at that position until 1897.

=== Death and legacy ===
In 1899, Swinton lost his eyesight, but did his best to remain active as a writer despite this handicap.

Swinton died in Brooklyn Heights, New York on December 15, 1901, just three days after his 72nd birthday. He was buried at Green-Wood Cemetery in Brooklyn, New York, beneath a monument erected by local trade unionists.

== Works ==
=== Books and pamphlets ===
- The New Issue: the Chinese American Question. New York: American News Company, 1870.
- The Tompkins Square Outrage: Appeal of John Swinton, Addressed to the Legislature, through the Committee on Grievances, and Delivered in the Assembly Chamber at Albany, March 25th, 1874. Albany: 1874.
- John Swinton's Travels: Current Views and Notes of Forty Days in France and England. New York: G.W. Carleton & Co., 1880.
- Storm and Stress: Address of John Swinton of New York, Held at the Social Democratic Festival, Ogden's Grove, Chicago, Sunday Afternoon, June 12, 1881. Chicago: n.p., 1881.
- Old Ossawattomie Brown: Speech on the 22nd Anniversary of John Brown's Death, Delivered in ... New York, December 2, 1881. New York: n.p., 1881.
- A Model Factory in a Model City: A Social Study. New York, Press of Brown, Green & Adams, 1888.
- Addresses before the American Federation of Labor Convention at Philadelphia, Pa., Dec., 1892. With William Salter and Amos J. Cummings. Washington, DC: American Federation of Labor, n.d. [1892].
- Striking for Life: Labor's Side of the Labor Question: The Right of the Workingman to a Fair Living. New York?: American Manufacturing and Pub. Co., 1894.
- A Momentous Question: The Respective Attitudes of Labor and Capital. Philadelphia: A.R. Keller Co., 1895.
- 1860 — Lincoln, Debs — 1895: A Remarkable Article Written in 1895 by the Great New York Journalist, John Swinton. Terre Haute, IN: Anchor Co., n.d. [1895].

=== Articles ===
- "The New Slave Trade," In Bruce Shapiro (ed.), Shaking the Foundations: 200 Years of Investigative Journalism in America. New York: Nation Books, 2003; pp. 40–44.
