= Sunland Boulevard =

Street in Los Angeles

Sunland Boulevard is a major thoroughfare in the Crescenta and San Fernando Valleys.

== Geography ==
Sunland Boulevard splits off of Foothill Boulevard in the Sunland area of the Crescenta Valley. It runs for about 5 miles (8 kilometers) before changing to Vineland Avenue directly south of San Fernando Road in Sun Valley. It also crosses intersection with Interstate 210 near its northern terminus and Interstate 5 near its southern terminus.

== Transportation ==
Sunland Boulevard is served by Metro Local line 90.
