= Monte Vista Hotel =

Former hotel in Los Angeles, California

Coordinates: 34°15′41″N 118°19′4″W

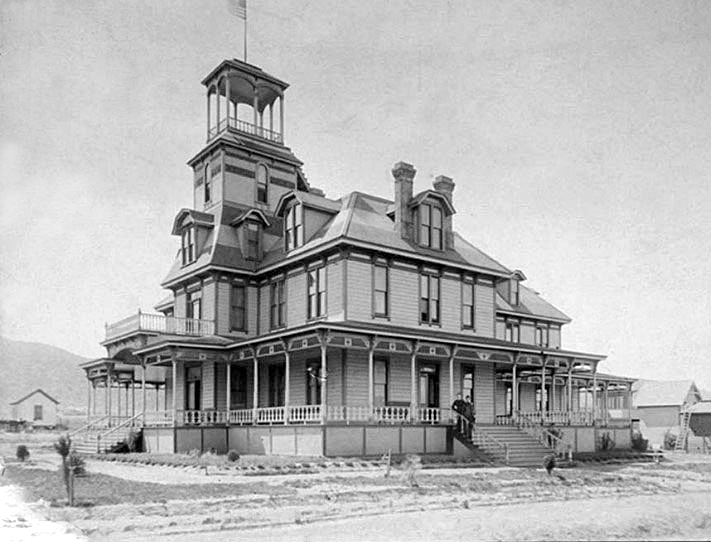
The Monte Vista Hotel in the late 19th century

The Monte Vista Hotel was a building which had been formerly located at the intersection of what today are Fenwick Street and Floralita Avenue in the Sunland-Tujunga district of Los Angeles. It was considered the first structure built in the district as well as the last surviving structure of a larger, pre-existing facility known as the Monte Vista Lodge.

== History ==
The Monte Vista Hotel was constructed in 1885 (or 1887) by Frank H. Barclay, who had previously inaugurated a health colony upon the site. In its early years it served as a luxury hotel and lodge for wealthy hunters who visited the area, which in those times was renowned for its game. It also helped to attract potential developers and homesteaders to Sunland, where Barclay owned most of the land. During this period the Monte Vista Hotel was recognized for its French chef and personal fireplaces equipped in each room. The Depression of 1882–1885 caused a downturn in the Monte Vista Hotel's fortunes, forcing Barclay to let go of the property. It was acquired by Quentin Rowley, whose family would later construct the Rowley House, a homestead with a natural stone façade which survives to the present day. In 1903, Rowley sold the Monte Vista.

In 1898, the Monte Vista Hotel briefly became involved in a local scandal involving Harry Clark, the young scion of a local wealthy family. After murdering a Chinese immigrant, Clark fled into the foothills of La Crescenta whereupon he came across Philip Begue, a local off-duty police officer, and asked him for directions to the Monte Vista Hotel. Begue, who had been warned to stay alert for Clark's presence, arrested the fugitive without incident.

Subsequently, the Monte Vista Hotel changed hands several times, becoming over the course of the decades a private home, a hotel again, a rooming house, and finally a retirement home. In its final guise, the facility was renamed Cypress Manor. Although the interior had remained mostly intact, by the 1960s the exterior had been extensively remodeled to the point where the original structure was difficult to discern.

In 1960, the owner of the Cypress Manor, Robert Christopher, proposed the construction of a 50-bed hospital upon the site. After failing to accomplish this, the building was abandoned in 1961. Two years later, ownership passed to Duncan Rimmer, a developer from Brentwood. After having been vacated, the structure became much vandalized, deteriorating to the point that local residents petitioned the city to have it demolished. In 1964, the Monte Vista Hotel was razed.
