= W. E. Smythe =

American writer (1861–1922)

William Ellsworth Smythe
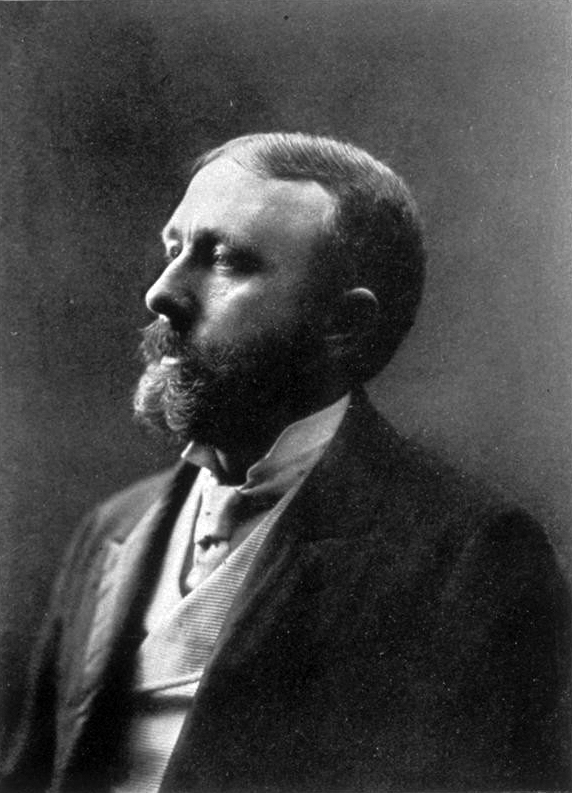
- W. E. Smythe
- Born: December 24, 1861; Worcester, Massachusetts, U.S.
- Died: October 6, 1922 (aged 60); New York City, New York, U.S.
- Occupations: Journalist, writer, social reformer
- Known for: Founder of the Little Landers movement
- Spouse: Harriet Bridge
- Children: 3

William Ellsworth Smythe, known as W. E. Smythe (1861–1922), was a journalist, writer and founder of the Little Landers movement, which aimed to settle small suburban lots with people who would farm their own properties, live off the land and sell or trade the surplus for needed income. In 1908 he set up such a colony in the Tijuana River valley (now San Ysidro, California), and in 1913 he joined in developing a similar venture in Tujunga, California. Smythe described the basic structure of the Little Land philosophy as colonies that "would provide low priced land, a public irrigation system and a cooperative market for the colony's products."

== Personal life ==
Smythe was born December 24, 1861, in Worcester, Massachusetts, to William Augustus Smythe, a wealthy shoe manufacturer, and Abbie Bailey Smythe. In 1882 he and Harriet Bridge were married. They had three children. Smythe died at the age of 61 on October 6, 1922, in his apartment on Fifth Avenue in New York City. He was survived by his son, W.E. Smythe Jr.

== Journalism ==
In high school he was editor of the school newspaper and later, in 1881, at the age of twenty, he tried to establish a printing business, but failed. Between 1888 and 1890 he published the Kearney Enterprise in Kearney, Nebraska. In 1889 a feisty Nebraska newspaper publisher named Edward Rosewater made Smythe the editor of the Omaha Bee.

"The next year a terrible draught [sic] gripped the Great plains. Smythe saw farmers abandoning their land and, within sight of creeks that had carried water a year before, shoot their livestock because they couldn't prevent the beasts from dying of thirst."

Smythe obtained the publisher's approval for a series of articles about the importance of irrigation. He researched the subject carefully, going back to the times of ancient Egypt, and published articles daily. He wrote for national magazines. He spoke at public meetings and became chairman of the influential National Irrigation Congress. Eventually he traveled the breadth of the country to drive home his message. He founded a magazine, Irrigation Age, which he edited until 1896.

== Settlements ==
Smythe organized a cooperative settlement called New Plymouth in Idaho and advised developers near Sacramento, California, and in Lassen County, where he founded the town of Standish. He moved to San Diego in 1902 and promptly ran unsuccessfully for Congress in the newly created Eighth District, as a Democrat, garnering 40.8 percent of the vote.

== Imperial Valley ==
In 1904 he traveled to Washington, D.C., to lobby for Imperial Valley farmers who wanted public ownership of the irrigation system in their valley. This trip earned him the scorn of Harrison Gray Otis's Los Angeles Times, which wrote

Investigation shows that the Imperial Water Users' Association has paid Smythe $2000 cash. Whether he presented an itemized bill showing all this to have been used as "expense money" was not learned. If so, Mr. Smythe likely lived very well, and could on as much style as the most fastidious ambassador.

== Little Landers ==
In 1908 he formed a corporation that bought 700 acres of the Belcher Ranch on the U.S. side of the Tijuana River, which is shared with Mexico, and immediately changed the name of the entire community to San Ysidro, after the patron saint of farmers in Spain.This was the first Little Landers colony, which attracted some 300 families to its promise. Smythe lived there from 1909 to 1911, overseeing a market that the farmers set up in San Diego to sell their produce.

Smythe began writing editorials in 1912 for the Scripps newspapers, whose publisher, E.W. Scripps, lived in San Diego, and he published a Little Landers magazine. He opened a Little Landers colony called Runnymede.

In 1913, M.V. Hartranft, a Glendale, California, land developer with utopianist ideas, joined with Smythe in forming a Little Landers colony in Tujunga, just north of the Verdugo Mountains in Los Angeles County.

The two men believed that anyone could be independent on a small acreage irrigated and lovingly farmed ... [They] joined together in their business ventures. Smythe was the idealist of the two and Hartrantf was the businessman who could make the ideas work.

== Government service ==
After World War I, Smythe was appointed U.S. assistant secretary of the interior for veterans land settlement.

== Bibliography ==
Smythe's most famous work was The Conquest of Arid America (New York: Harper & Brothers, 1900). Writing two books occupied his time between 1902 and 1907. They were Constructive Democracy and History of San Diego. He published a third book as well, in 1921, City Homes on Country Lanes, and another, Reclamation of Arid America.
