= Maja Trochimczyk =

American poet

Maja Trochimczyk (born Maria Anna Trochimczyk; 30 December 1957 in Warsaw, Poland, other name: Maria Anna Harley) is an American music historian, writer, and poet of Polish descent. She published six poetry books: Rose Always – A Love Story, 2017; Miriam's Iris, or Angels in the Garden, 2008; Slicing the Bread: Children's Survival Manual in 25 Poems (Finishing Line Press, 2014); Into Light: Poems and Incantations; The Rainy Bread – Poems from Exile, 2016; an anthology Chopin with Cherries, 2010), and a multi-faith anthology Meditations on Divine Names.

== Career ==
Her poems and photographs appear in numerous journals and anthologies, including Clockwise Cat, "Ekphrasis, Epiphany Magazine," The Lily Review, Loch Raven Review, Magnapoets, Quill and Parchment, Phantom Seed, poetic diversity, Sage Trail, San Gabriel Valley Poetry Quarterly, The Original Van Gogh's Ear Anthology, Poetry Super Highway, The Scream Online, The Houston Literary Review, and other venues. She may be heard discussing her poetry on KPFK's Poets' Cafe, where Lois P. Jones interviewed her in 2011. Video recordings of Trochimczyk's poetry are found on the YouTube channel of Moonrise Press and Poetry LA.

As a music historian, she published six books of music studies and essays: After Chopin: Essays in Polish Music (USC, 2000); The Music of Louis Andriessen (Routledge, 2002) including interviews with the composer and analyses of his music; Polish Dance in California (Columbia UP, East European Monographs, 2007); A Romantic Century in Polish Music,; Frédéric Chopin: A Research and Information Guide. Co-edited with William Smialek in the series Routledge Music Bibliographies (New York: Routledge, 2015). and Lutoslawski: Music and Legacy, a collection of essays about Witold Lutoslawski, co-edited with Stanislaw Latek and published jointly by the Polish Institute of Arts and Sciences in Canada (Montreal) and the Polska Akademia Umiejetnosci (Krakow, Poland) in 2014., ISBN 978-0-986-88514-3

In 2001, she created a site on Polish folk dance at the USC Polish Music Center, with entries about various Polish dance types and folk-dance groups active in California. An article in the Cosmopolitan Review shows the unwitting dependence of the folk-dance movement in America on Stalinist aesthetics and ideology.

Trochimczyk wrote 18 book chapters and 27 peer-reviewed articles on music and culture, listed on her website with publication details; publications before 2000 appeared under the name of Maria Anna Harley. Her study of Gorecki's ideas of motherhood and his Third Symphony was published in The Musical Quarterly in 1998 and reprinted in a special issue of the Polish Music Journal dedicated to Gorecki in 2003. Her work on spatial music and its composers, such as Henry Brant or Iannis Xenakis, appeared in American Music, Computer Music Journal, Her doctoral dissertation: Trochimczyk, Maja (June 1994). "Space and spatialization in contemporary music: history and analysis, ideas and implementations".

The Journal of Musicological Research issued an article on Grazyna Bacewicz and Picasso. Trochimczyk's work on Bartok's concept of nature and his birdsong portrayals appeared in Studia Musicologica and Tempo. Zbigniew Skowron's book Lutoslawski Studies included her chapter on Witold Lutoslawski's musical symbols of death. At the same time, Halina Goldberg's The Age of Chopin featured a study of extreme nationalism in the reception of Chopin, associated with the concept of the "Polish race." A presenter at the Second and Third International Chopin Congresses in Warsaw, Poland (1999 and 2010, respectively), she published articles in their proceedings. She maintains a popular Chopin blog, Chopin with Cherries. Trochimczyk also wrote about Chopin's reception by women composers in the Polish Review (2000), and by poets in Polish-American Studies. The latter journal issued her study of the image of Paderewski explored earlier in the Polish Music Journal. A recent research interest is the immigration of Polish composers to America, discussed in a chapter in Anna Mazurkiewicz's East Central Europe in Exile, vol. 1, and Polin, vol. 19, Polish-Jewish Relations in North America. She also edited the proceedings of the first conference on Polish Jewish Music held in 1998 at USC for the Polish Music Journal. Eva Mantzouriani's Polish Music after 1945 included Trochimczyk's chapter on the events of 1968.

== Recognition ==
A recipient of fellowships/awards from McGill University, Social Sciences and Humanities Research Council of Canada, University of Southern California, Polish American Historical Association, and American Council of Learned Societies, Dr. Trochimczyk served as poet laureate of Sunland-Tujunga, Los Angeles, in 2010–2012, and as the President of the Helena Modjeska Arts and Culture Club in Los Angeles in 2010–2012. For the Club, she organized over 30 events (lectures, concerts, film screenings, and receptions) during her tenure, documented on the blog modjeskaclub.blogspot.com. Among other activities, she presented the Modjeska Prizes to eminent Polish actors Jan Nowicki, Barbara Krafftowna, and Anna Dymna. As the Poet Laureate of Sunland-Tujunga, she wrote a monthly column for a community paper, The Voice of the Village. She continued poetic activities in the local community as a member of the Planning Committee of the Village Poets of Sunland-Tujunga as well as the owner of the Moonrise Press. Simultaneously, she has been an officer and newsletter editor of the Polish American Historical Association since 2009. In 2011, she became a member of the editorial board of the Ecomusicology Newsletter of the Ecomusicology Study Group of the American Musicological Society.

In 2012, Trochimczyk received a medal from the Ministry of Culture and the Arts of Poland for the promotion of Polish culture. Her volunteer work has also been recognized by the City and County of Los Angeles. In 2013, she was nominated as Chair of the Culture Committee in the Polonia Advisory Board for the Consulate General of the Republic of Poland in Los Angeles. In 2015, she received the Distinguished Service Award from the Polish American Historical Association, and in 2016, the Creative Arts Prize from the same organization for her poetry volumes about the Polish civilian experience in WWII and its aftermath, Slicing the Bread and The Rainy Bread.

== Books ==
- Into Light: Poems and Incantations. Collection of spiritual poems and meditations. (Los Angeles: Moonrise Press, 2016). Color paperback. ISBN 978-1-945-93803-0.
- Frédéric Chopin: A Research and Information Guide. Co-edited with William Smialek. Series Routledge Music Bibliographies (New York: Routledge, 2015). ISBN 978-0-8153-2180-4.
- The Rainy Bread - Poems from Exile. (Los Angeles: Moonrise Press, 2016). Poetry Collection – poems about the Polish experience during WWII and its aftermath, mainly civilian deportations to Siberia, life under Soviet and German occupation, and exile. ISBN 978-1-945-93800-9 – Paperback. ISBN 978-1-945-93801-6 – Ebook.
- Slicing the Bread. (Finishing Line Press, 2014). ISBN 978-1-62229-687-3
- Meditations on Divine Names. Poetry anthology (Los Angeles: Moonrise Press, 2012). ISBN 978-0-9819693-8-1.
- Chopin with Cherries: A Tribute in Verse. Poetry anthology (Los Angeles: Moonrise Press, 2010). ISBN 978-0-9819693-0-5.
- A Romantic Century in Polish Music. An edited volume of music studies. (Los Angeles: Moonrise Press, 2009). ISBN 978-0-9819693-3-6 (paperback).
- Rose Always – A Love Story. Poetry collection. (Los Angeles: Moonrise Press, 2017). Color paperback with rose photographs ISBN 978-1-945-93817-7.
- Miriam's Iris, or Angels in the Garden. Poetry collection. (Los Angeles: Moonrise Press, 2008). ISBN 978-0-9819693-2-9 (with color photographs), ISBN 978-0-578-00166-1 (paperback).
- Polish Dance in Southern California. In the East European Monographs series. (New York: Columbia University Press, 2007). ISBN 978-0-88033-593-5.
- The Music of Louis Andriessen. An edited volume of music studies and interviews. (New York and London: Routledge, 2002). ISBN 978-0-8153-3789-8.
- After Chopin: Essays in Polish Music. An edited volume of music studies and translations. (Los Angeles: Polish Music Center at USC, 2000). ISBN 0-916545-05-9.
