= Labor Day (United States) =

Federal holiday in the United States

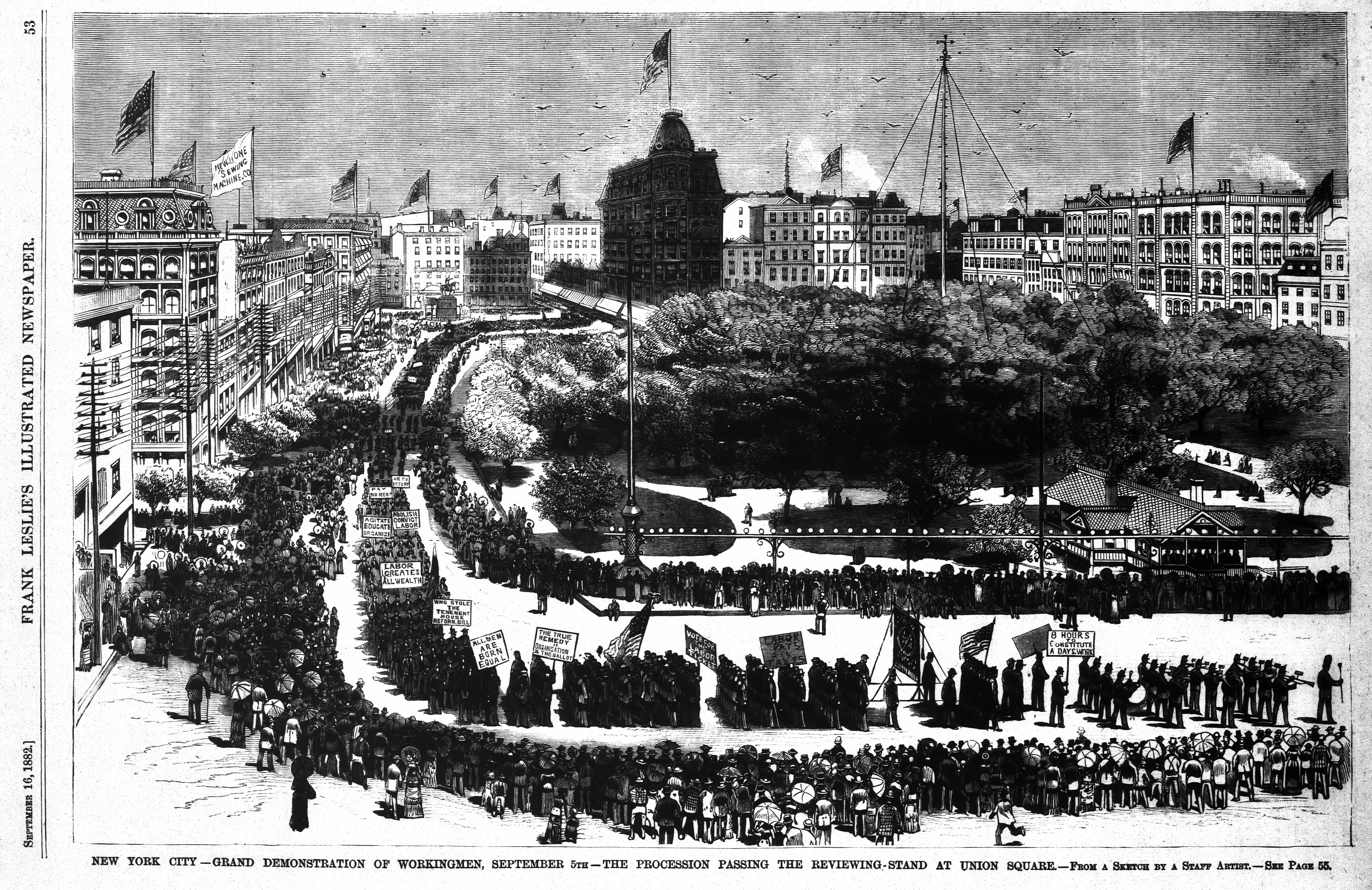
- Labor Day Parade in New York's Union Square, 1882
- Observed by: United States
- Type: National
- Celebrations: Parades, banquets, paid time off work
- Date: First Monday in September
- 2025 date: September 1
- 2026 date: September 7
- 2027 date: September 6
- 2028 date: September 4
- Frequency: Annual
- Related to: Labour Day in Canada

Labor Day is a federal holiday in the United States celebrated on the first Monday of September to honor and recognize the American labor movement and the works and contributions of laborers to the development and achievements in the United States.

Beginning in the late 19th century, as the trade union and labor movements grew, trade unionists proposed that a day be set aside to celebrate labor. "Labor Day" was promoted by the Central Labor Union and the Knights of Labor, which organized the first parade in New York City. By the time it became an official federal holiday in 1894, thirty states in the U.S. officially celebrated Labor Day.

Canada's Labour Day is also celebrated on the first Monday of September. More than 150 other countries celebrate a similar holiday, International Workers' Day, on May 1.

== History ==
=== Origin ===
P. J. McGuire, Vice President of the American Federation of Labor, is frequently credited as the father of Labor Day in the United States.

Beginning in the late 19th century, as the trade union and labor movements grew, diverse groups of trade unionists chose a variety of days on which to celebrate labor. In the United States, a September holiday called Labor Day was first proposed in the early 1880s.

Alternative accounts of the event's origin exist. Descendants of two men with similar last names claim their great-grandfather was the true father of the holiday.

According to one early history of Labor Day, the event originated in connection with a General Assembly of the Knights of Labor convened in New York City in September 1882. In connection with this clandestine Knights assembly, a public parade of various labor organizations was held on September 5 under the auspices of the Central Labor Union (CLU) of New York. Secretary of the CLU Matthew Maguire is credited for first proposing that a national Labor Day holiday subsequently be held on the first Monday of each September in the aftermath of this successful public demonstration.

An alternative theory maintains that the idea of Labor Day was the brainchild of Peter J. McGuire, a vice president of the Federation of Organized Trades and Labor Unions, which was a predecessor of the American Federation of Labor. After a visit to Toronto where he saw parades celebrating labor that May, he put forward the initial proposal in spring 1882. According to McGuire, on May 8, 1882, he made a proposition to the fledgling Central Labor Union in New York City that a day be set aside for a "general holiday for the laboring classes". He recommended that the event should begin with a street parade as a public demonstration of organized labor's solidarity and strength, with the march followed by a picnic, to which participating local unions could sell tickets as a fundraiser. He suggested the first Monday in September as an ideal date for such a public celebration, owing to optimum weather and the date's place on the calendar, sitting midway between the Fourth of July and Thanksgiving public holidays.

Labor Day picnics and other public gatherings frequently featured speeches by prominent labor leaders.

In 1909, the American Federation of Labor convention designated the Sunday preceding Labor Day as "Labor Sunday", to be dedicated to the spiritual and educational aspects of the labor movement. This secondary date failed to gain significant traction in popular culture, although some churches continue to acknowledge it.

=== Legal recognition ===
The popularity of the event spread across the country. In 1887, Oregon became the first state of the United States to make Labor Day an official public holiday. By 1894, thirty U.S. states were already officially celebrating Labor Day. In that year, shortly after the Pullman Strike, the Congress passed a bill recognizing the first Monday of September as Labor Day and making it an official federal holiday. President Grover Cleveland signed the bill into law on June 28.

The federal law only made it a holiday for federal workers. As late as the 1930s, unions were encouraging workers to strike to make sure they got the day off. All U.S. states, the District of Columbia, and the United States territories have subsequently made Labor Day a statutory holiday.

== Labor Day versus May Day ==
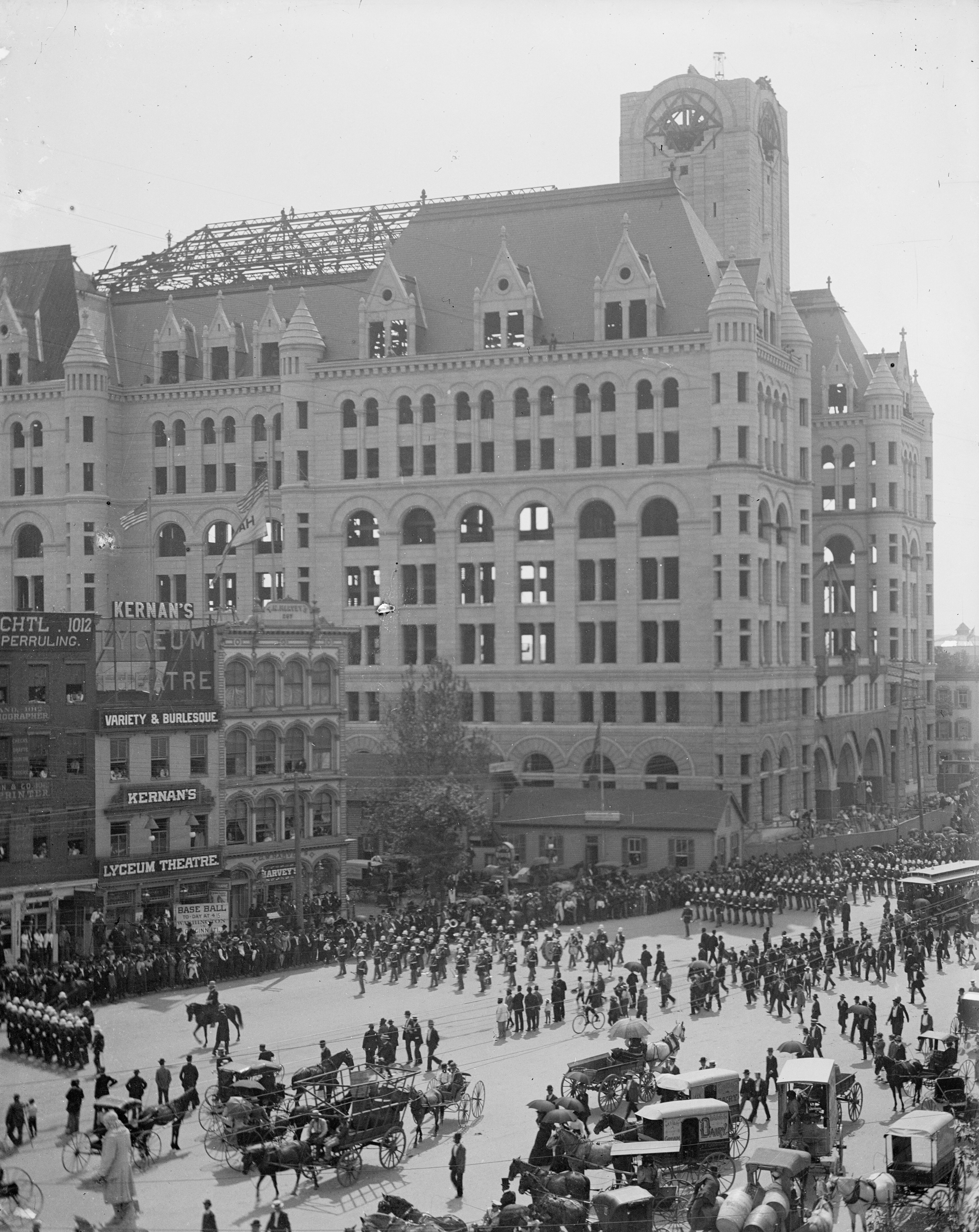
The 1894 Labor Day parade on Pennsylvania Avenue in Washington, D.C.

The date of May 1, an ancient European folk holiday known as May Day, emerged in 1886 as a holiday for the celebration of labor, later becoming known as International Workers' Day. The date had its origins at the 1885 convention of the American Federation of Labor, which passed a resolution calling for adoption of the eight-hour day effective May 1, 1886. While negotiation was envisioned for achievement of the shortened work day, use of the strike to enforce this demand was recognized, with May 1 advocated as a date for coordinated strike action. In Chicago, that strike culminated in the bloody Haymarket affair of May 4, 1886.

There was disagreement among labor unions at this time about when a holiday celebrating workers should be. Some advocated for continued emphasis of the September march-and-picnic date. Others sought the designation of the more politically charged date of May 1. Conservative Democratic President Grover Cleveland was one of those concerned that a labor holiday on May 1 would tend to become a commemoration of the Haymarket affair and would strengthen socialist and anarchist movements that backed the May 1 commemoration around the globe. In 1887, he publicly supported the September Labor Day holiday as a less inflammatory alternative, formally adopting the date as a United States federal holiday through a law he signed in 1894.

Since the mid-1950s, the United States has celebrated Loyalty Day and Law Day on May 1. Unlike Labor Day, neither are legal public holidays, in that government agencies and most businesses do not shut down to celebrate them, and therefore have remained relatively obscure. Loyalty Day is formally celebrated in a few cities, while some bar associations hold Law Day events to celebrate the rule of law.

== Unofficial end of summer ==
Beach in Belmar, New Jersey on Labor Day weekend

Labor Day is called the "unofficial end of summer" because it marks the end of the U.S. culture's nominal summer season. Of the 7% of Americans who take two-week vacations, many take their vacations during the two weeks ending Labor Day weekend. Many fall activities, such as school and sports (particularly football), begin about this time.

In the United States, many school districts resume classes around the Labor Day holiday weekend. Some begin the week before, making Labor Day weekend the first three-day weekend of the school calendar. Others begin the Tuesday following Labor Day. Many districts across the Midwest are opting to begin school after Labor Day.

In the U.S. state of Virginia, the amusement park industry successfully lobbied for legislation requiring most school districts in the state to have their first day of school after Labor Day, in order to give families another weekend to visit amusement parks in the state. The relevant statute has been nicknamed the "Kings Dominion law" after one such park. This law was repealed in 2019.

In the U.S. state of Minnesota, the State Fair ends on Labor Day. Under state law, public schools normally do not begin until after the holiday. One reason given for this timing was to allow time for schoolchildren to show 4-H projects at the Fair.

In U.S. sports, Labor Day weekend marks the beginning of many fall sports. National Collegiate Athletic Association (NCAA) teams usually play their first games that weekend, and the National Football League (NFL) traditionally play their kickoff game the Thursday following Labor Day. The Southern 500 NASCAR auto race has been held on Labor Day weekend at Darlington Raceway in Darlington, South Carolina from 1950 to 2003 and since 2015. At Indianapolis Raceway Park, the National Hot Rod Association hold their finals of the NHRA U.S. Nationals drag race that weekend. Labor Day is the middle point between weeks one and two of the U.S. Open tennis championships, held in Flushing Meadows, New York.

In the fashion world, Labor Day was once considered the last day it was acceptable to wear white or seersucker. The source of the tradition lies in part with the migration of wealthy 19th century New Yorkers back from their summer-home Newport Mansions and accompanying change back from summer clothes. The traditional last day to wear straw hats moved from around Labor Day (September 1) to September 15. In 1922, the Straw Hat Riot broke out due to gangs snatching the hats of men violating this rule in New York City. The unofficial beginning of summer, and the summer fashion season in the United States, is Memorial Day. In the 2020s, some people have approved of wearing white year-round.

There are numerous events and activities organized in major cities. For example, New York offers the Labor Day Carnival, or the West Indian/Caribbean Day Parade and fireworks over Coney Island, both of which happen in the Brooklyn borough. In Washington, one popular event is the Labor Day Concert at the U.S. Capitol featuring the National Symphony Orchestra with free attendance.

== Observance dates (1959–2042) ==
Year															Labor Day
1959	1964	1970		1981	1987	1992	1998		2009	2015	2020	2026		2037	September 7 (week 37)
	1965	1971	1976	1982		1993	1999	2004	2010		2021	2027	2032	2038	September 6 (common year week 36, leap year week 37)
1960	1966		1977	1983	1988	1994		2005	2011	2016	2022		2033	2039	September 5 (week 36)
1961	1967	1972	1978		1989	1995	2000	2006		2017	2023	2028	2034		September 4 (week 36)
1962		1973	1979	1984	1990		2001	2007	2012	2018		2029	2035	2040	September 3 (week 36)
1963	1968	1974		1985	1991	1996	2002		2013	2019	2024	2030		2041	September 2 (week 36)
	1969	1975	1980	1986		1997	2003	2008	2014		2025	2031	2036	2042	September 1 (week 36)

== Labor Day sales ==
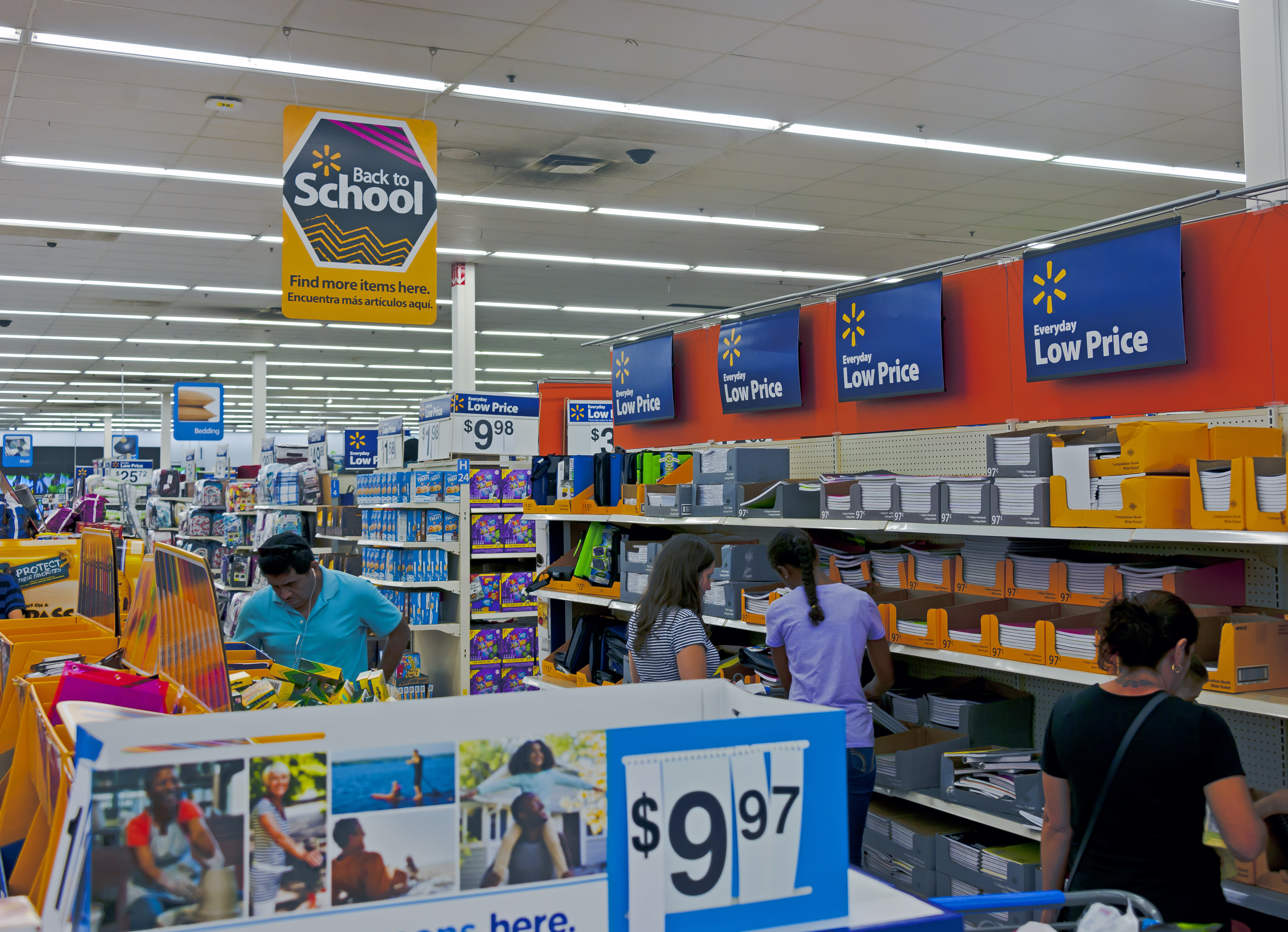
A back-to-school sale at a Walmart

To take advantage of large numbers of potential customers with time to shop, Labor Day has become an important weekend for discounts and allowances by many retailers in the United States, especially for back-to-school sales. Some retailers claim it is one of the largest sale dates of the year, second only to the Christmas season's Black Friday.

== See also ==
- Labor unions in the United States
- United States labor law
- Workers' Memorial Day

== General and cited references ==
- Green, James (2007). Death in the Haymarket: A Story of Chicago, the First Labor Movement and the Bombing that Divided Gilded Age America. New York: Anchor Books. ISBN 978-1-4000-3322-5. OCLC 494649024.
