= Bolton Hall (California) =

Coordinates: 34.25262956°N 118.28830093°W

- U.S. National Register of Historic Places
- Los Angeles Historic-Cultural Monument
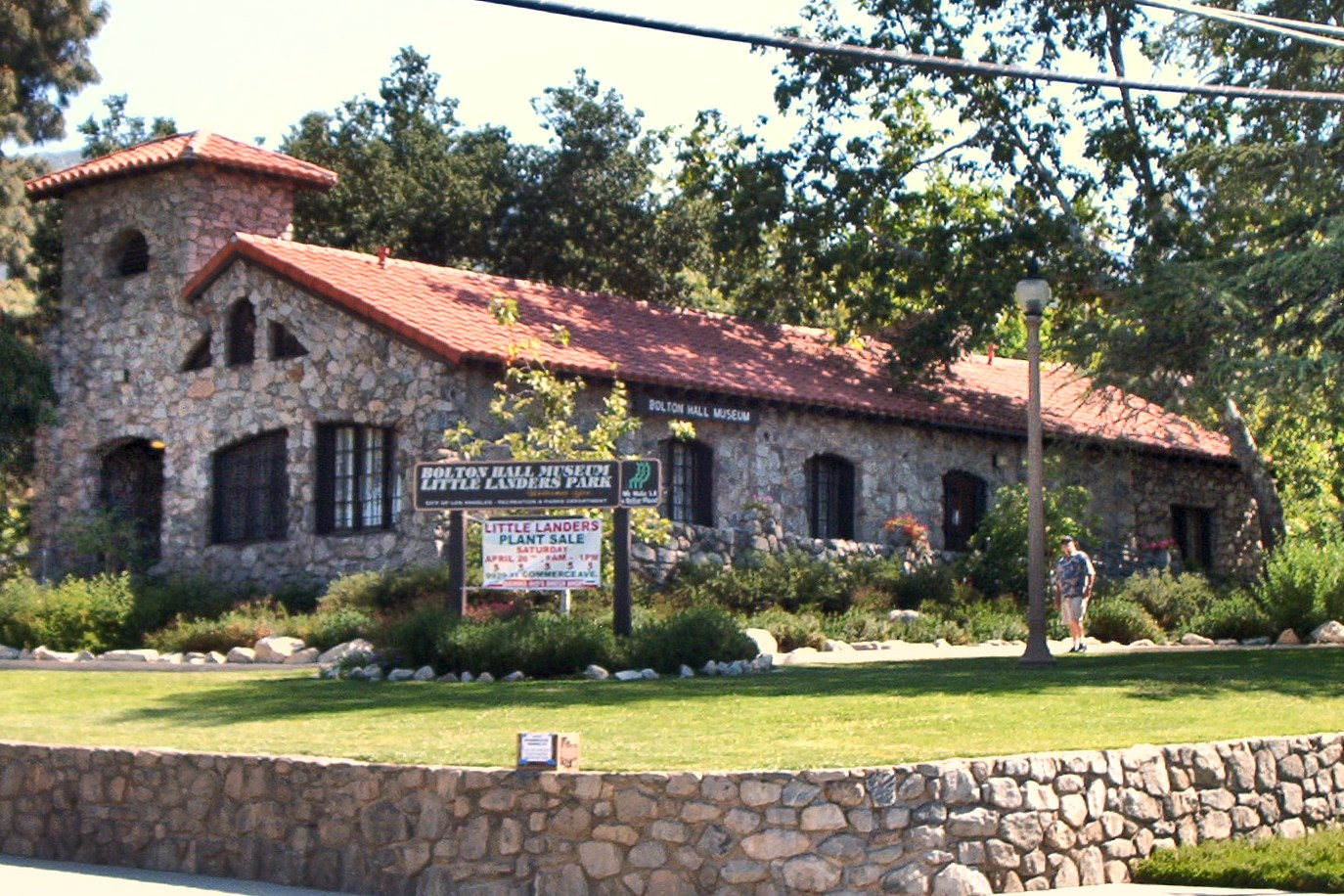

- Location within the Los Angeles metropolitan area Location within California Location within the United States
- Location: 10110 Commerce Ave., Tujunga, California
- Built: 1913
- Architect: George Harris
- Architectural style: American Craftsman; Mission Revival
- NRHP reference No.: 71000159
- LAHCM No.: 2

Significant dates
- Added to NRHP: November 23, 1971
- Designated LAHCM: August 6, 1962

Bolton Hall is a historic American Craftsman-era stone building in Tujunga, Los Angeles, California. Built in 1913, Bolton Hall was originally used as a community center for the utopian community of Los Terrenitos. From 1920 until 1957, it was used as an American Legion hall, the San Fernando Valley's second public library, Tujunga City Hall, and a jail. In 1957, the building was closed. For more than 20 years, Bolton Hall remained vacant and was the subject of debates over demolition and restoration. Since 1980, the building has been operated by the Little Landers Historical Society as a local history museum.

== Los Terrenitos ==
In the early 1900s, the area now known as Tujunga was undeveloped land, the former Rancho Tujunga. In 1913, William Ellsworth Smythe, working alongside M.V. Hartranft (they had purchased the land together), formed a utopian community called Los Terrenitos — Spanish for The Little Lands. Smythe was the leader of the Utopian Little Landers movement and had already established colonies in Idaho and San Ysidro, California. He advocated the principle that families settling on an acre or two of land could support themselves and create a flourishing community.

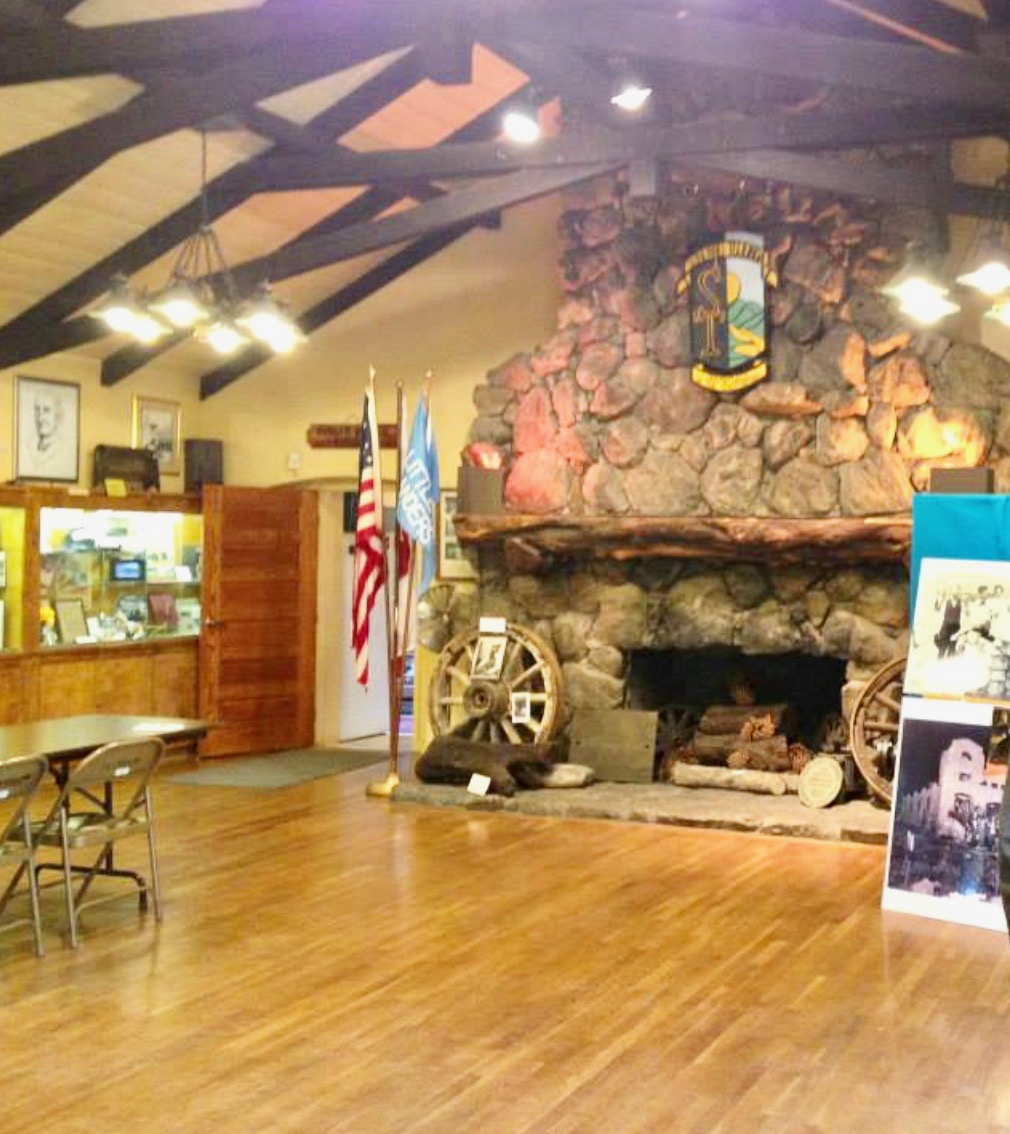
A look inside Bolton Hall.

Town lots in Tujunga were sold to settlers at $800 for an acre of land and a life of independence.

Bolton Hall was built in 1913 by George Harris, a self-described "nature builder", rock mason, and stone sculptor. He first named it "Bolton Hall Hall", after Bolton Hall (1854–1938), a New York City progressive activist and proponent of the back-to-the-land movement. Harris urged that the 3,000-square-foot (280 m^{2}) hall be built solely of native materials and selected a design that he said borrowed nothing from European architecture. Harris and the Terrenitos community built the hall using granite chunks and stones from nearby fields and hillsides and from the Tujunga Wash. Stones were placed in position in the structure based on the positions in which they settled after falling from a cliff.

The spacious main room has shiny hardwood floors and a massive rock fireplace in the center. The fireplace is spanned by a 14-foot (4.3 m) mantel fashioned from a single eucalyptus tree. Beneath the mantel, Harris inscribed the words "To the Spiritual Life of Soil". The structure was built at a cost of $6,480.

When Bolton Hall opened in August 1913, the Los Angeles Times reported that it marked the "awakening of the Vale of Monte Vista" (the former name of Sunland):

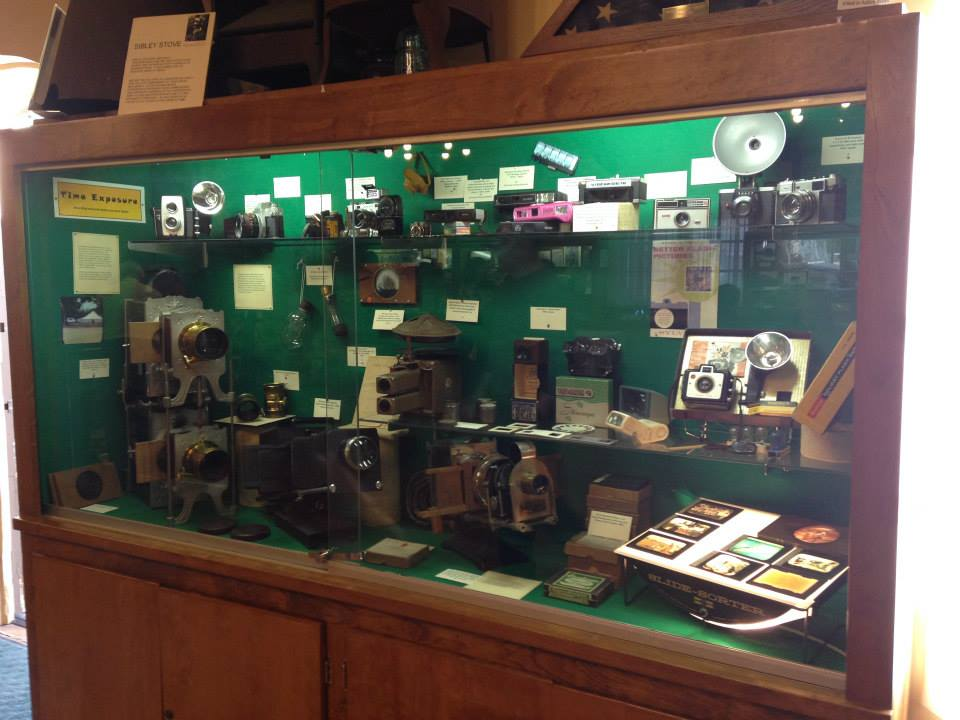
Vintage camera display at Bolton Hall in February 2014.

First settled nearly thirty years ago, the valley has shown more life in the past six months than in all its previous history. Los Terrenitos, the settlement of "'little-landers," has made wonderful progress since its inception, five months ago, about 200 families having purchased land, not all of whom are yet on the ground. But enough are here to make it a beehive of industry. The dedication of "Bolton Hall" last Saturday aroused much enthusiasm among the "little-landers."

The Times also reported that Bolton Hall was "built to stand for ages", and it has survived the 1971 Sylmar and 1994 Northridge earthquakes without a scratch.

During the hall's early years, it hosted community meetings patterned after those held in old New England town halls. Over the next decade, it was used for church services, musical performances, lectures, motion picture shows, the Women's Club, dances, and pot-luck suppers. It also was the site of the San Fernando Valley's second public library.

== City Hall ==
After World War I, the hall was used as an American Legion hall for several years. In 1925, Tujunga incorporated as a city, and Bolton Hall became Tujunga City Hall. In 1932, Tujunga was consolidated with the City of Los Angeles, and the building was used for the next 25 years for a variety of municipal services, including the San Fernando Valley's second public library and a jail. However, it remained known as Tujunga City Hall until its closure in 1957.

== Vacancy and preservation efforts ==
With its closure in 1957, Bolton Hall was put up for sale. However, the city estimated it would take more than $42,000 to bring the building up to code, and two attempts to auction the site failed to draw any bids. When the city announced in 1959 that it intended to tear down the old building and convert the property into a neighborhood park, the Little Landers Historical Society of Sunland and Tujunga was formed to fight for the preservation of Bolton Hall. The group watered the trees during the summer and collected more than 400 signatures on petitions seeking to preserve the structure. The group brought in a representative of the National Trust, and the building was found to have historical value. However, the group had difficulty coming up with funding to maintain the structure and bring it up to current safety standards. Bolton Hall's future remained uncertain, and the property vacant, for more than twenty years as the "Save Bolton Hall" movement continued to have difficulty raising funds.

== Historical museum ==
In 1976, an agreement was reached to have the City of Los Angeles renovate the building's exterior with the Little Landers Historical Society committing to renovate the interior for operation as a historical museum. At the time, the building had been kept "tightly sealed" since 1957. However, by 1979, funding was still lacking, and the Times reported that "the vacant old building houses only cobwebs and dust."

In late 1979, Los Angeles City Councilman Bob Ronka secured $169,000 in federal funds to augment $23,800 raised by the Little Landers Historical Society. With nearly $200,000 in public and private funds, the building was finally restored after it had sat vacant for more than 20 years.

The Bolton Hall Historical Museum opened in 1980. The artifacts displayed at the museum include the gavel used by the presiding officer during early town meetings, building tools used in the construction of Bolton Hall, old photographs, and the old clock from the first Tujunga Post Office. The museum also has a congratulatory letter from Bolton Hall, the New York lawyer and writer for whom the building was named. Near the front entrance of the museum, there is a tobacco-stained stone that juts out from the wall; it was used by early colonists to clean out their pipes when the building was used as a church.

The museum is open to the public every Saturday and Sunday from 1:00 to 4:00 p.m. Admission is free.

== See also ==
- List of Registered Historic Places in Los Angeles
- List of Los Angeles Historic-Cultural Monuments in the San Fernando Valley
- Little Landers
- Stonehurst Historic Preservation Overlay Zone
