= M. V. Hartranft =

American journalist

Marshall Valentine Hartranft (pronounced hart-raft), known as M. V. Hartranft, (1872?–1945) was an agriculturalist, a land developer and the president of the Glendale-Eagle Rock Railway in Los Angeles County, California. He was known as the "Socrates" of the Verdugo Hills north of Glendale and the "father" of Tujunga, California.

== Biography ==
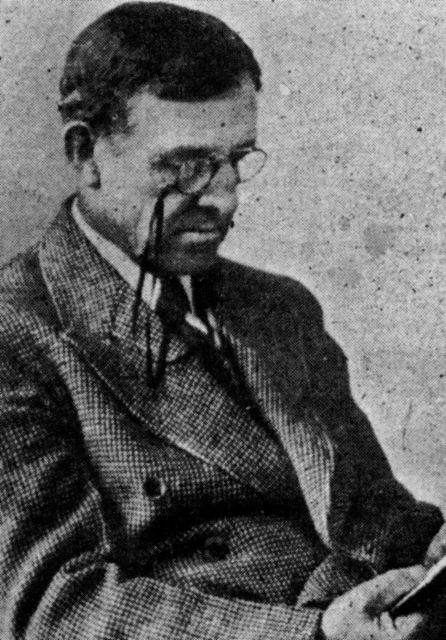
M. V. Hartranft

Before Hartranft came to California in 1890 he had been a gardener, unsuccessfully attempting to set up a vegetable market. He was afterward known to recite the jingle

To grow crops to sell is to speculate like hell, but to grow crops to eat keeps you standing on both feet.

In his new home he established a newspaper, The Los Angeles Daily Fruit World, and in 1900 began a "magazine-type newspaper" called The Western Empire, which he used as an instrument to sell agricultural land.

Hartranft's first real estate development was in 1892, in Glendale and Montrose, California. Shortly after 1897, he secured a tract of land from the Kern County Land Company for resale to more than 300 families in what is today Wasco, California. He called this effort the "Fourth Home Extension Colony."

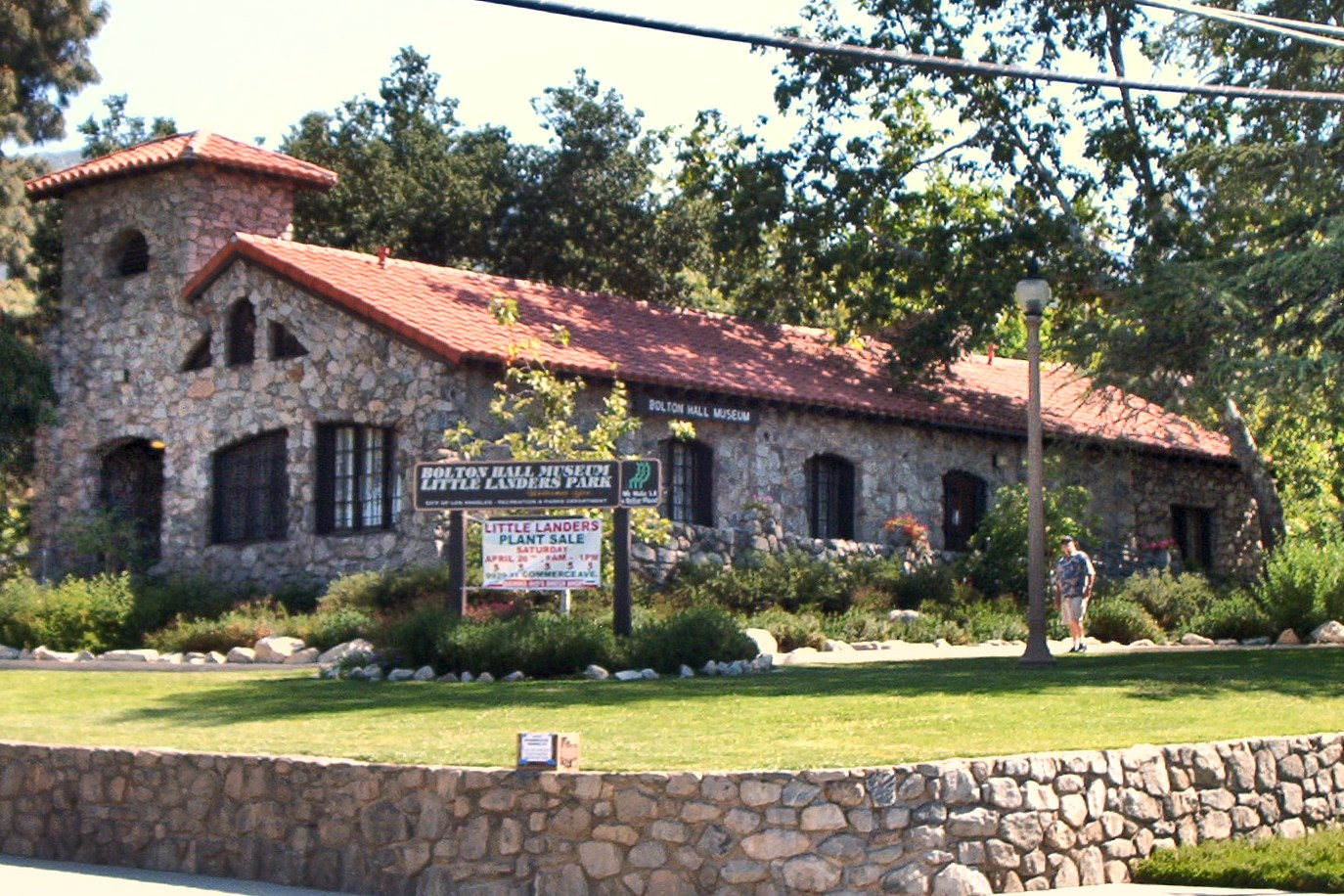
Bolton Hall in Tujunga

In 1907 he helped establish the "Little Landers" colony of Tujunga, which was based on the principle that everything a family could need might be gained through farming the property that they owned and that "land had value only if people lived on it." He donated a parcel of land for the construction of Bolton Hall, which was used as a community center, a city hall and, finally, a historical museum.

In 1910 Hartranft began the first "auto stage," or motorbus, route from Tujunga to Los Angeles in a "two-cylinder Buick pick-up truck with no top and seats along the sides." In 1939 he claimed his service gave Tujunga the distinction of being the first town in the United States to have used bus transportation. That was when he was an honored guest as a new bus line began operating between Tujunga and North Hollywood.

A Los Angeles Times reporter described Hartranft as "the 'Socrates' of the green Verdugo Hills" when the land developer made the principal speech at the April 1923 dedication of a cross atop the peak of newly named Mount McGroarty, in honor of California's recently deceased poet laureate, John Steven McGroarty.

Hartranft was an unsuccessful candidate in California's 11th Congressional District in November 1932 on the Liberty Party ticket. He came in third after the Republican and Democratic candidates but garnered 13.9 percent of the vote.

In 1939 Hartranft published a book, Grapes of Gladness, as a counterpoint to John Steinbeck's disturbing work, The Grapes of Wrath. In it, Hartranft spoke of the "communistic implications" of Steinbeck's "notoriously inaccurate" novel and argued that "California still has room for all who can feed themselves from our endless-chain gardens, instead of from the State Treasury." A Los Angeles Times reviewer said the book described how

the Digger Indians could live on native plants and roots. Then Ma and Pa Hoag are shown the St. John's bread trees and their fruits. Also they discover how easy it is to get land for next to nothing in California if only they will work.

Hartranft was a member of the California State Forestry Board in 1943, and he was instrumental in persuading officials to stock supplies of fire-resistant pine seeds as a way to reforest areas destroyed by brush and forest fires.

== Personal life ==
His wife was Louise Owens Hartranft, born about 1872, who worked with him in opening real estate developments in North Los Angeles, Glendale, Montrose and Sunland-Tujunga.

He had a nephew, William G. Colby, over whom Hartranft was guardian and who died in 1919 at the age of 26 while serving as a missionary in China. In 1932, another nephew, the Hartranfts' adopted son Marshall Colby Hartranft, 32, committed suicide by carbon monoxide poisoning after first mailing a letter to his father. The latter telephoned associates to go to his son's home and raced there himself by automobile but help arrived too late.

M. V. Hartranft died at the age of 73 in March 1945 while working at his desk.
