= Sunland-Tujunga, Los Angeles =

Sunland-Tujunga
- Neighborhood of Los Angeles
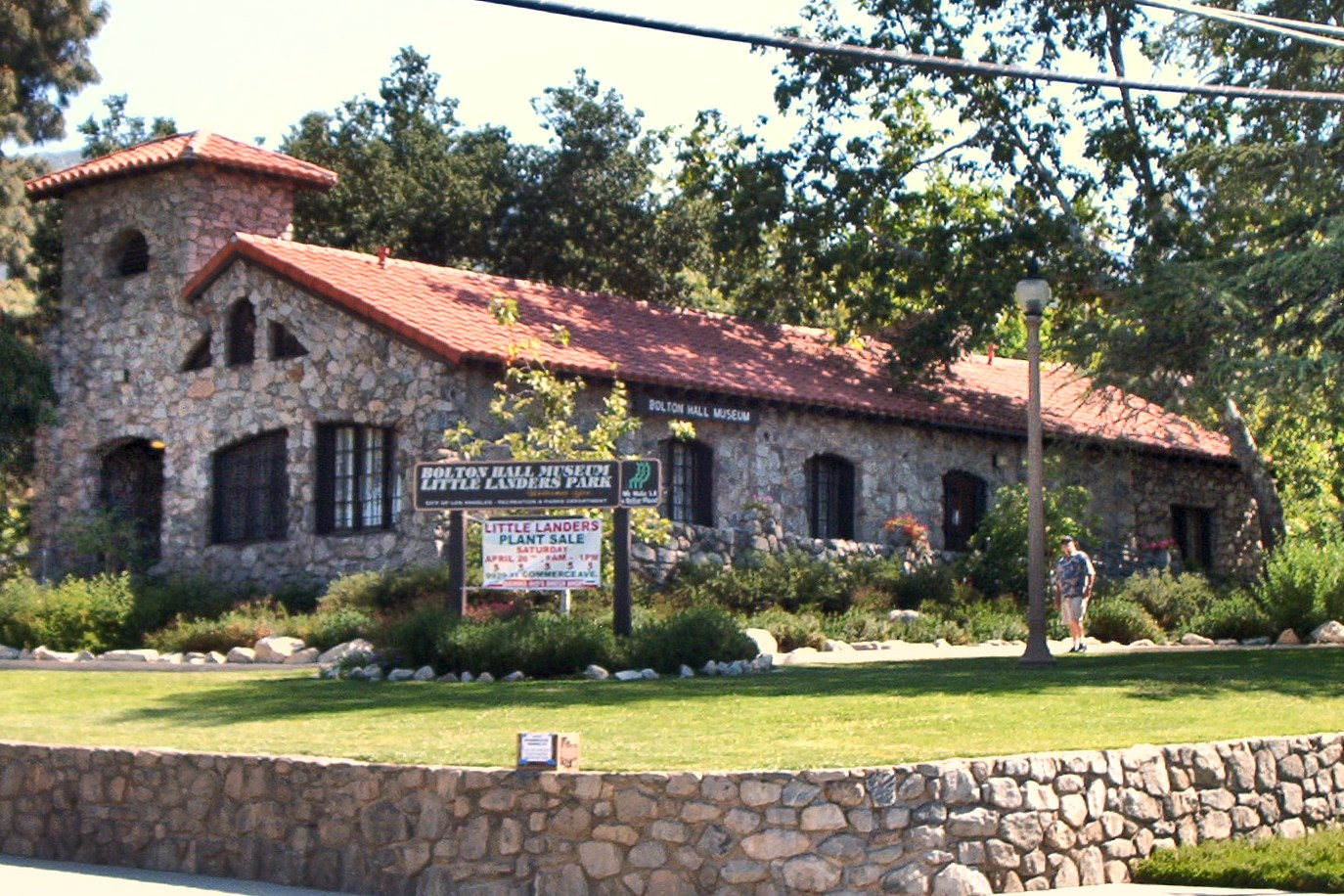
- Historic Bolton Hall in Tujunga, 2008

- Location within Los Angeles
- Coordinates: 34°15′8″N 118°17′15″W
- Country: United States
- State: California
- County: Los Angeles
- City: Los Angeles

Population (2008)
  - Total: 59,087

Sunland-Tujunga, Los Angeles

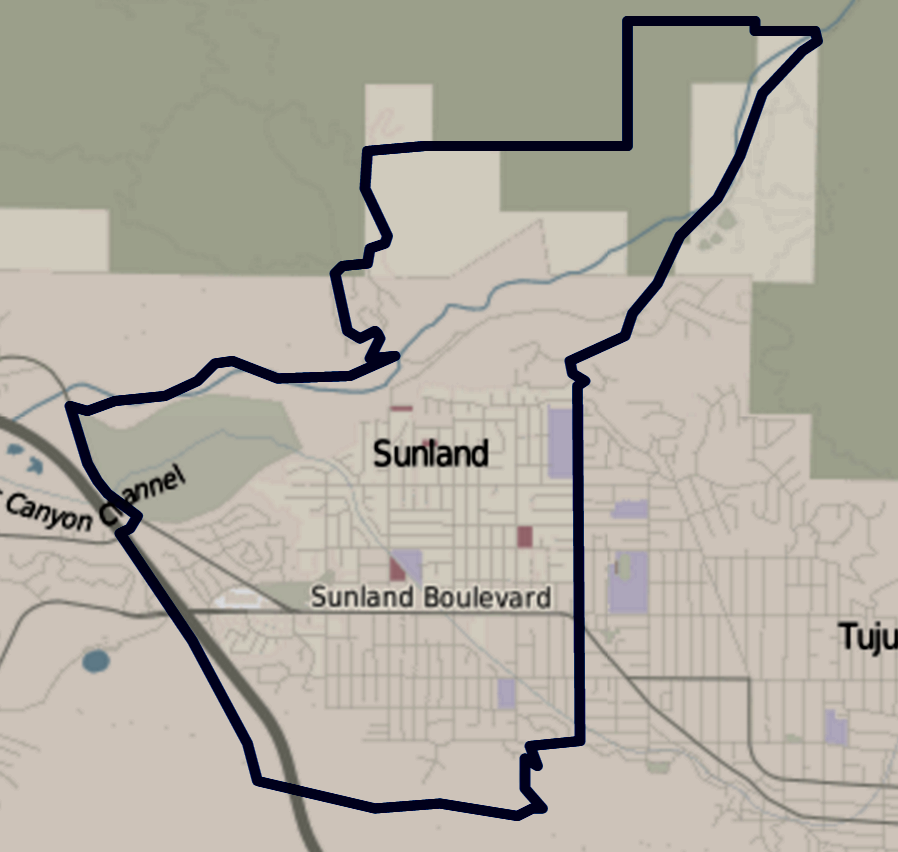
Sunland

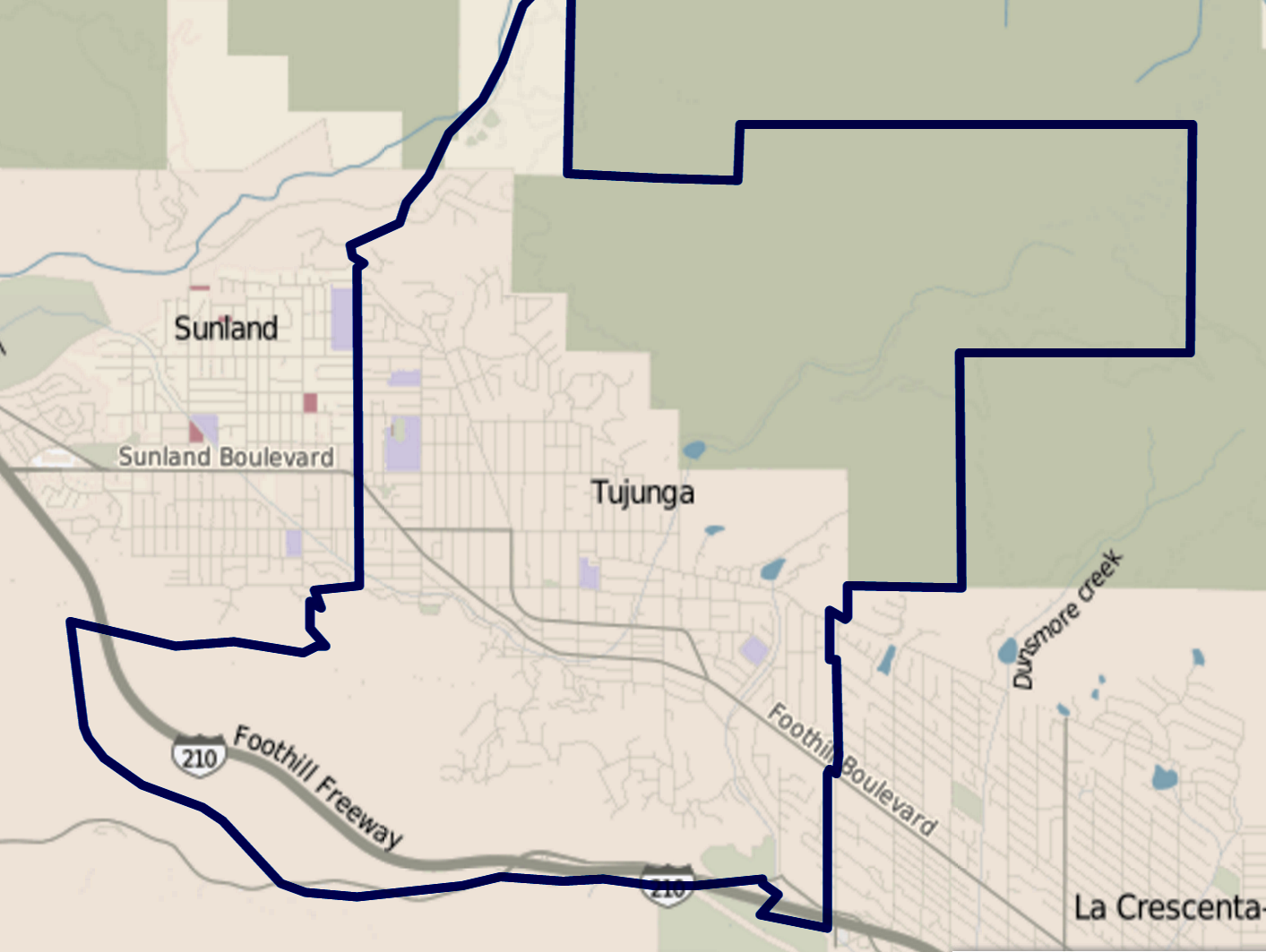
Tujunga

Sunland-Tujunga /təˈhʌŋɡə/ is a neighborhood in Los Angeles, California, within the Crescenta Valley and Verdugo Mountains. Sunland and Tujunga began as separate settlements and today are linked through a single police station, branch library, neighborhood council, chamber of commerce, city council district, and high school. The merging of these communities under a hyphenated name goes back as far as 1928. Sunland-Tujunga contains the highest point of the city, Mount Lukens.

== History ==
=== Pre-colonial and Mexican eras ===
Sunland and Tujunga were originally home to the Tongva people. In 1840, the area was part of the Rancho Tujunga Mexican land grant, but later developers marked off a plot of land known as the Tejunga Park, or the Tujunga Park Tract. The name "Tujunga" (or Tuxunga) is assumed to have meant "old woman's place" in the Fernandeño language, a dialect of the extinct Tongva language, where tuxu, "old woman", is a term for Mother Earth in Tongva mythology. The term is thought to relate to an ethnohistoric narrative, known as Khra'wiyawi, collected by Carobeth Laird from Juan and Juana Menendez at the Leonis Adobe in 1916. In the narrative, the wife of Khra'wiyawi (the chief of the region) is stricken with grief over the untimely loss of her daughter. In her sadness, she retreats to the mountains and turns to stone. It is this event that is thought to be the basis for the village name. In fact, a large rock in Little Tujunga Canyon looks like an old woman in a sitting position.

=== Early Sunland: 1885–1925 ===
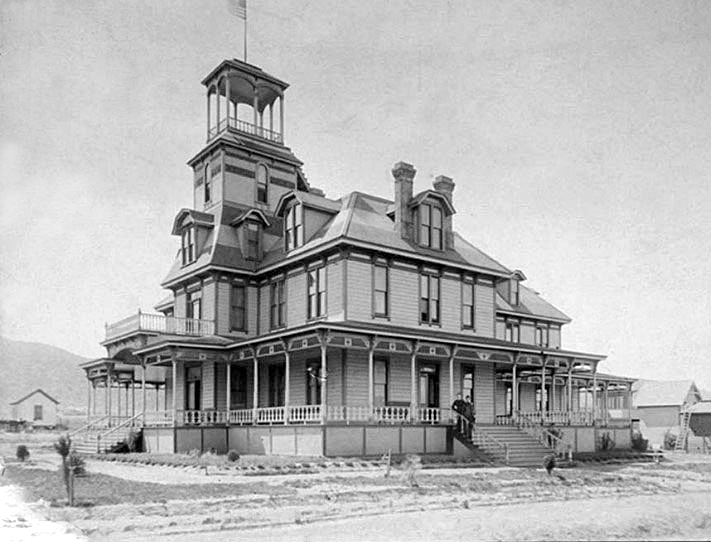
Monte Vista Hotel, 1880s

Sunland began as Monte Vista in 1885, when 2,200 acres (8.9 km^{2}) of the Tejunga [sic] Park tract were divided into lots ranging from five to 40 acres (160,000 m^{2}). One of the first uses of the new tract was the planting of 40 acres (160,000 m^{2}) of olives, which made it the largest olive orchard in Los Angeles County. In 1887, the Monte Vista Hotel was being served by the Sunland Post Office. By 1906, the appellation "Sunland" was being used by the Los Angeles Times rather than "Monte Vista". A 1907 story noted that Sunland was the "first supply store, and a good one, about seven miles from the railroad" at San Fernando, at the mouth of the Little Tejunga and Big Tejunga canyons (the old spelling).

In 1908, Sunland was referred to as difficult to access, at a height of 1,500 feet (460 m) "over rough mountain roads". An automobile trip from Los Angeles took "a long day" to complete. In 1910, a Los Angeles Times correspondent wrote about Sunland:

The place is aptly named.. . . one gets no inkling of the beauties till he is right in the town. Great live oaks, scattered with Nature's reckless disregard for expense, give the place a stately quiet.. . . In the center of town the oaks are so thick that the sun is baffled, and this section has been made a public park, which is the Fourth of July and general hot-weather rendezvous of the country round, from Glendale to San Fernando.

By 1923, Sunland had a population of about 2,000 and an active chamber of commerce. The sloping hills of what was called the Monte Vista Valley were the site of vineyards for table grapes, and the town's sole industry, a cannery, specialized in packing olives from local trees. Monte Vista Park in the center of town attracted picnickers, with a county home for children, sponsored by women's clubs and other organizations. This charity was a descendant of the Monte Vista Lodge, a home for "undernourished children" organized by social worker Belle N. Hall and opened in 1921 by the Council of Community Service. It had 45 rooms in a former hotel on 2.5 acres (10,000 m^{2}) of land. just a block from Sunland Park.

After Tujunga was organized as a city in 1925, a move sprang up in Sunland to be annexed to the new municipality, but the idea was rejected "by a heavy vote" in October of that year, and activists in the then-Monte Vista School District turned their attention to a proposed $21,000 bond issue for a new school building.

=== Early Tujunga: 1907–1929 ===
In 1907, social philosopher and community organizer William Ellsworth Smythe joined forces with real estate speculator Marshall V. Hartranft to found what Smythe believed would be a kind of utopia. The movement had been successful in establishing colonies in San Ysidro, California, and in Idaho. The utopianists had as their slogan, "A Little Land and a Lot of Living," and the founders divided their community into 1.5-acre (6,100 m^{2}) lots, which they called "little lands". A community center built from local river rock, Bolton Hall, was dedicated in August 1913 and still stands as a historical monument and museum operated by the Little Landers Historical Society.

An early advertising slogan was "Move to Tujunga with a trowel and a bag of cement, and build your own." After the end of World War I, hundreds of "rent-oppressed" people from Los Angeles did exactly that, and they built their houses with foundations fashioned from the "great masses of stones and boulders" that lay throughout the town. For the most part, the "Indian pueblo idea" was followed, or a "rustic hills" style, and homes without boulder foundations were rare. By 1927, Tujunga had about 4,000 residents, having surpassed Sunland in population. Many of the settlers maintained small farms with gardens, poultry, rabbits, bees, and various other livestock.

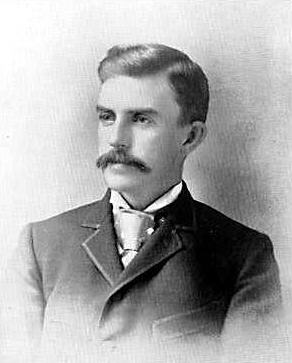
John Steven McGroarty, a Tujunga-based poet laureate, in 1893

Tujunga was home to John Steven McGroarty, playwright, U.S. congressman, and California Poet Laureate. He lived in a home he built himself and completed in 1923, known as Rancho Chupa Rosa. The building is an Historic Cultural Monument (#63) of the City of Los Angeles and is now known as the McGroarty Arts Center.

On Tujunga's main street in the 1920s was a place called "Dean's store, the locale of the 'Millionaire's Club of Happiness and Contentment', a little group of the town's pioneers that is featured in the writings of John Steven McGroarty". Tujungans led by McGroarty first wanted to become a city of the sixth class to be called "Verdugo Hills" in 1924, and a petition to that effect was submitted to the board of supervisors, which postponed the idea indefinitely because of concerns about the proposed boundaries.

Tujunga was nevertheless incorporated after an election on April 21, 1925, with the southern border following the Rancho Tujunga boundary. A. Adams was elected treasurer, and Mrs. Bertha A. Morgan was chosen as city clerk. Bolton Hall served as the city hall until Tujunga was consolidated with Los Angeles in 1932.

One of the first orders of business for the new city of Tujunga in 1925 was an attempt to enlarge the municipality by taking in the foothills south and southwest of the new city, bounded on the east by the "La Crescenta Rancho line, south to Big Tuna Canyon" and west to the then-Los Angeles boundary and Wicks Road. The attempt failed because Los Angeles annexed the area first.

Tujunga's 1,500-foot (460 m) elevation and geographic isolation from the San Fernando Valley and the Los Angeles Basin freed it from some of the air pollution that was a problem in many other parts of Greater Los Angeles. Because of this, it attracted many asthmatics early on. In 1929, the Tujunga City Council set policy to establish zones where "sanitariums and other institutions for the care of tubercular patients" could be established.

=== Joining Los Angeles: 1926–1932 ===
Most of today's Sunland was annexed to the city of Los Angeles, effective August 4, 1926. La Tuna Canyon was annexed in 1927. On June 23, 1927, the city of Los Angeles held an election for much of the same territory as claimed by Tujunga, above, and the annexation passed, "based largely on a big block of votes within an old-folks' home at Sunland, which can participate in the Community Chest funds when and if they are within the city limits of the greater city". The result was a legal dispute that had to be settled in the courts.

The famous grove of oak trees, owned by the county, and widely known as the Monte Vista Park of Sunland, is involved in the dispute. The municipality of Tujunga has already agreed to release its authority over the park to the county authorities, so that administration. . . will continue for ten years without change, except as to police protection in event of disorders.

The first election for Tujunga to be consolidated with Los Angeles was held on February 15, 1927. In heavy rain, voters turned down the idea by a vote of 594 to 354. A second election held in March 1930 also resulted in defeat for annexation, "by a large majority". John Steven McGroarty was on a committee opposing annexation called "All for Tujunga". The third and final election in January 1932 resulted in a vote to join Los Angeles, although the actual transfer was delayed by inaction of state authorities. Tujunga abandoned its independence and joined the city on March 8, 1932.

=== Tuna Canyon Detention Station: 1941–1943 ===
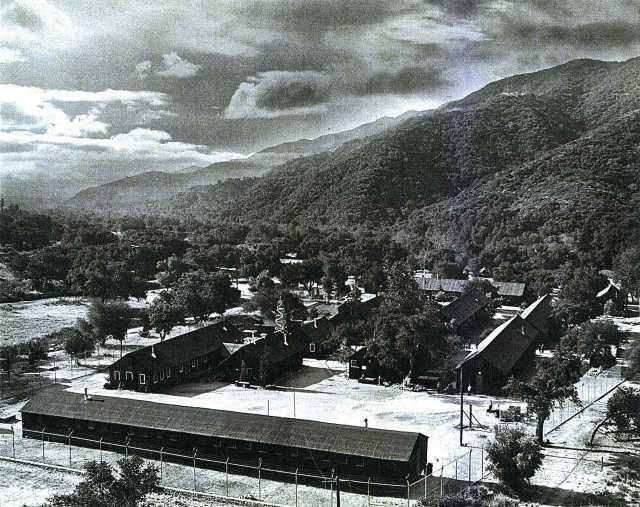
Detention station, 1941

Tuna Canyon Detention Station was a temporary holding facility used for the internment of Japanese Americans during World War II in the Tujunga community of Los Angeles, California. Some Italian Americans, German Americans, and Japanese Peruvians were also interned there. From this detention station, prisoners were later transferred to permanent internment camps.

=== Gravel pit: 1950s–1960s ===
In 1959, a trial court held that the city had no authority to refuse a zoning variance to Consolidated Rock Company to continue operating a gravel pit in the Big Tujunga Wash. An appellate court overturned that decision, but in 1962, the California Supreme Court upheld the right of the city to ban the pit. The decision was a victory for local people who had battled the project for more than three years: They contended that the dust from the existing pit affected the area's reputation as a "haven for asthma sufferers". Attorney Peter R. Rice argued as a friend of the court that climate was more important than commercial mining operations.

=== City Council redistricting: 1986–2002 ===
Los Angeles City Councilman Howard Finn of Sunland died in office on August 12, 1986, and his Northeast San Fernando Valley First District was left without an incumbent.

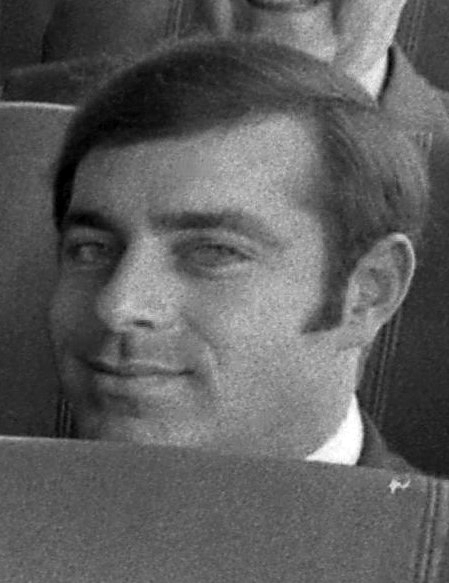
Joel Wachs, 1972

At the same time, the City Council was under a court order to redistrict itself to provide more representation for Latinos. After a bitter contest in which Finn's semirural constituents fought against being combined with more built-up areas and amid traces of ethnic animosity, the result was to move the vacant First District seat into a redrawn, 69% Latino area north and west of downtown Los Angeles and to place Sunland-Tujunga into a reshaped Second Council District, already represented by Joel Wachs. It was a Y-shaped configuration "with only a long, thin finger of territory" connecting Sunland-Tujunga on the north with Van Nuys on the south. A lawsuit against the plan was dismissed in late September by U.S. District Judge James M. Ideman.

Despite the fact that Wachs had struggled to prevent being assigned to a district that was 90% new to him, the councilman was warmly greeted when he arrived to meet his new constituents in a reception at the Sunland-Tujunga Municipal Building. He found an area with a down-home, rural flavor and about 30% of the voters in his new district. He told a reporter:

There hasn't been one nasty person, one hostile ... They want to be friends.... In the second-largest city in the U.S., that you can have an area like this to live in is just fantastic. Wherever I've gone, preserving the lifestyle seems to be the No. 1 issue.

Wachs served on the council for 15 more years. He resigned effective 2001, and a city redistricting commission took the opportunity to propose a shakeup in boundaries, splitting the Second District in two. Before that could be considered, though, Wendy Greuel was elected to the city council. In March 2002, she reopened the Sunland-Tujunga field office (closed by Wachs), and the redistricting plan was never heard of again. Greuel served until July 2009. She was succeeded by Paul Krekorian.

=== Home Depot controversy: 2005–2009 ===
In January 2009, hardware company Home Depot announced it was abandoning a five-year effort to turn a former Kmart store at the corner of Foothill Boulevard and Woodward Avenue, Tujunga, into a big-box store of its own.

The Los Angeles Times reported:

Opponents also mobilized hundreds of people to turn out for meetings on the project, including a marathon seven-hour session that turned into a shouting match over day laborers and immigration. Home Depot, in turn, had retained a team of expensive lobbyists who arranged for buses to transport supporters to meetings at city hall. In 2006, one of those lobbyists sent a memo promising to feed and transport 150 people in orange T-shirts to a city council hearing, where they would appear in favor of Home Depot—at a cost of $24,000 to the company.

The city council determined that the extent of construction involved exceeded the limits of what is known as "tenant improvements" and thus qualified as a "project" subject to the California Environmental Quality Act (CEQA). Under CEQA rules, Home Depot would be required to carry out an environmental impact report, so the company filed a lawsuit against councilmember Wendy Greuel, accusing her of improperly interfering with the process. The company paid $2 million to lobbying firms on behalf of the project.

=== Homelessness: 2010 and after ===
Beginning in 2010, news accounts began to highlight a homeless problem in the Big Tujunga Wash. As Channel 7 Eyewitness News put it:

For years, the Big Tujunga Wash has provided a picturesque backdrop for local residents who enjoy the rare natural river bed that's perfect for hiking, jogging, or collecting butterflies. Also, the new Angeles National Golf Club is right in the middle of the wash. But, residents say there's trouble brewing in Big Tujunga. Homeless camps are big concerns for residents, who say they sympathize with the homeless, but say they drag in too much trash.

Major cleanups were undertaken in the homeless encampments in the wash in 2015 and later, with tons of trash removed by volunteers and by city workers. One of them was reported as follows:

The cleanup — and summary eviction of as many as a hundred squatters — on 300 acres of private land a little more than a mile upstream from Hansen Dam was organized and financed by property owners of the Riverwood community of Sunland, a hillside enclave of about 35 homes whose residents come and go on a single road crossing the wash. Over the last three years, the growth of the shanty village has despoiled a public resource and subjected homes along Oro Vista Avenue to burglaries and the threat of violence, said Brian Schneider, who spoke for the residents.

== Geography ==
=== Setting ===
The neighborhood lies between the Verdugo Mountains and the San Gabriel Mountains. It is contiguous on the east with La Crescenta-Montrose. Sunland and Tujunga are divided by Mount Gleason Avenue, with Sunland on the west and Tujunga on the east. Mount Lukens, located within Tujunga, is the highest point in Los Angeles, at 5,074 ft (1,547 m).

=== Thoroughfares ===
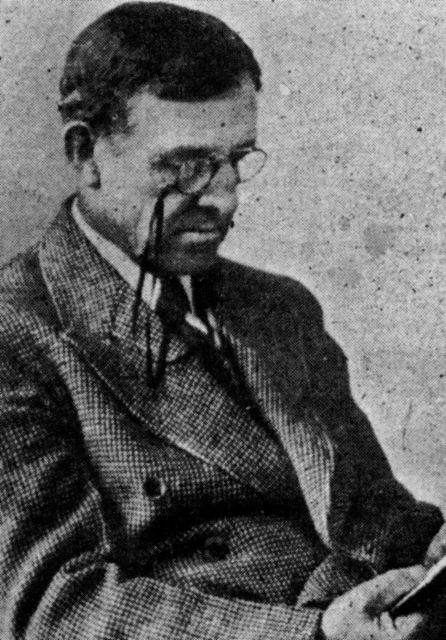
M.V. Hartranft, for whom Hartranft Avenue was named

By 1927, half of the streets had been paved, and a state highway ran through the town.

Streets within the Sunland and Tuna Canyon annex to Los Angeles were renamed in June 1929. The main east-west road, previously known as Michigan Avenue, became Foothill Boulevard. Other streets were renamed as follows: Los Angeles Street to Apperson Avenue, Sherman Street to Hartranft Avenue, Center Street to Grenoble Avenue, North Street to Wentworth Avenue, Third Street to Woodward Avenue, and Hill Street to Hillrose Avenue. Sunset renamed to Commerce St. Manzanita Drive was renamed McGroarty Avenue in honor of John Steven McGroarty, who lived nearby.

In the 1960s, the Sunland-Tujunga Chamber of Commerce took an active stand in opposition to routing the proposed Foothill Freeway through Shadow Hills, Los Angeles, claiming the neighborhood's "rural atmosphere" would be destroyed and would wipe out 28 more homes than an alternate route.

After years of discussion and delay, the final stretch of the 48.6-mile (78.2 km) freeway through Sunland-Tujunga was scheduled for dedication on April 3, 1981, with State Transportation Director Adriana Gianturco presiding. Exits in Sunland and Tujunga are, from west to east, at Sunland Boulevard, La Tuna Canyon Road, and Lowell Avenue (shared with La Crescenta). The freeway's right-of-way almost completely bypasses the main part of the community, and runs along a viaduct in the Verdugo Mountains.

Today, the neighborhood has one major thoroughfare: Foothill Boulevard; nearly all businesses in Sunland-Tujunga are located on or near it. Tujunga Canyon Boulevard is a heavily traveled north-south route, but is primarily residential. Sunland Boulevard and Wentworth Street are popular surface streets that connect the community to Sun Valley and the rest of the city of Los Angeles. Sunland-Tujunga is also served by the Interstate 210 freeway. Big Tujunga Canyon Road connects Sunland-Tujunga to the Angeles Forest Highway, while La Tuna Canyon Road provides an alternate route into Sun Valley through the rugged portion of the Verdugo Mountains.

=== Climate ===
Sunland-Tujunga has a hot-summer Mediterranean climate (Csa under the Köppen climate classification).

Climate data for Tujunga, California (1966–1986)
Month	Jan	Feb	Mar	Apr	May	Jun	Jul	Aug	Sep	Oct	Nov	Dec	Year
Record high °C (°F)	89 (32)	90 (32)	91 (33)	99 (37)	109 (43)	106 (41)	112 (44)	110 (43)	112 (44)	100 (38)	92 (33)	84 (29)	112 (44)
Mean daily maximum °C (°F)	64.1 (17.8)	67.1 (19.5)	67.8 (19.9)	72.1 (22.3)	77.3 (25.2)	84.6 (29.2)	91.5 (33.1)	91.0 (32.8)	85.4 (29.7)	77.3 (25.2)	69.0 (20.6)	64.2 (17.9)	76.0 (24.4)
Daily mean °C (°F)	53.4 (11.9)	55.3 (12.9)	55.7 (13.2)	58.8 (14.9)	63.8 (17.7)	69.8 (21.0)	75.7 (24.3)	75.7 (24.3)	71.9 (22.2)	64.9 (18.3)	57.7 (14.3)	53.2 (11.8)	63.0 (17.2)
Mean daily minimum °C (°F)	42.7 (5.9)	43.5 (6.4)	43.5 (6.4)	45.4 (7.4)	50.4 (10.2)	55.0 (12.8)	59.9 (15.5)	60.4 (15.8)	58.4 (14.7)	52.5 (11.4)	46.4 (8.0)	42.3 (5.7)	50.0 (10.0)
Record low °C (°F)	27 (−3)	30 (−1)	30 (−1)	30 (−1)	39 (4)	39 (4)	46 (8)	49 (9)	44 (7)	30 (−1)	31 (−1)	25 (−4)	25 (−4)
Average precipitation mm (inches)	4.31 (109)	4.52 (115)	4.50 (114)	1.54 (39)	0.47 (12)	0.06 (1.5)	0.02 (0.51)	0.16 (4.1)	0.63 (16)	0.37 (9.4)	2.34 (59)	2.43 (62)	21.35 (541.51)
Average snowfall cm (inches)	0.0 (0.0)	0.0 (0.0)	0.0 (0.0)	0.0 (0.0)	0.0 (0.0)	0.0 (0.0)	0.0 (0.0)	0.0 (0.0)	0.0 (0.0)	0.0 (0.0)	0.0 (0.0)	0.1 (0.25)	0.1 (0.25)
Average precipitation days	6	6	7	4	3	1	0	1	2	2	4	4	40
Source: xmACIS2

== Population ==
In 2009, the Los Angeles Times's "Mapping L.A." project supplied these neighborhood statistics based on the 2000 census, showing that Sunland, including Shadow Hills, had a census-measured population of 28,414 in 2000. Tujunga was slightly smaller, at 26,527. In both Sunland and Tujunga, the percentage of White people was high for the county. The percentages of divorced males, married females, and divorced females were among the county's highest.

Sunland

Population (without Shadow Hills): 15,316. Median household income: $68,720, high for the city of Los Angeles, but about average for the county. The percentage of residents 25 and older with a high-school diploma and some college education was high for the county.

Shadow Hills

Population: 13,098. It was a moderately diverse neighborhood. The area had a high family income. The median age at 39 was old for both the county and the city. The percentages of veterans who served during World War II or Korea and Vietnam were among the county's highest.

Tujunga

Population: 26,527. Median household income: $58,001. The percentages of residents 25 and older with a high school diploma and some college education were high for the county. The median age was 36, old for the city of Los Angeles but about average for the county. The percentage of residents ages 35 to 49 was among the county's highest. 9.7 percent of the population were veterans – high for the city of Los Angeles but about average for the county overall. The percentage of Vietnam veterans was among the county's highest.

== Reputation ==
Sunland-Tujunga's reputation has changed over the years (see below)

=== Fresh air ===
In the 1950s through the 1970s, the area was known as a "haven for asthma sufferers" and that it was "long noted for the beneficial qualities of its pure air" and had a "reputation as a health resort" or a "reputation for clean mountain air". Tujunga was seen as having a "near-Switzerland setting – high and dry".

In 1957, Coronet called Tujunga "the most healthy place in the world," and that publicity brought a flood of inquiries into the office of the Sunland-Tujunga Chamber of Commerce, hundreds a month. In 1963, the area was seen as "famous for its climate beneficial to asthma sufferers".

=== Biker gangs ===
By 1990, however, Tujunga had developed a reputation as a tough community and a center for biker gangs. As a Los Angeles Times writer put it:

No one really knows why so many long-haired, bearded young men on motorcycles, aligned in groups with names like "The Devil's Henchmen", chose to hang out in this workingman's community perched on the southwest slopes of the San Gabriel Mountains a half dozen miles north of downtown Glendale. But hang out they did, in droves, and Tujunga developed an unenviable reputation as one of Southern California's premier "biker towns".

In 2001, another writer called Sunland-Tujunga "part middle-class suburb, eclectic mountain hideaway, and rundown commercial strip dotted with biker hangouts". That same year, still another writer said this about Tujunga:

Police say the bad-apple bikers bring a particular set of problems, mainly the use and sale of speed [ methamphetamine ]. Tujunga's reputation for meth peaked in the 1990s, and the LAPD singled out the area in 1994 as the speed capital of the Valley. Users cruising for a fix were a common sight on some of the narrow side streets off Tujunga Canyon Boulevard. Police say the meth scene, though still active in Tujunga, is no longer the problem it was, thanks to block-by-block community policing efforts and the town's relative gentrification.

Even Marlene Hitt, the community's newly appointed poet laureate, said in 2001 that she got the job in part to counter Sunland-Tujunga's image as a home to drug dealers.

== Education ==
About 22% of Sunland and Tujunga residents aged 25 and older had earned a four-year degree by 2000, an average percentage for the city and the county.

=== Local schools ===
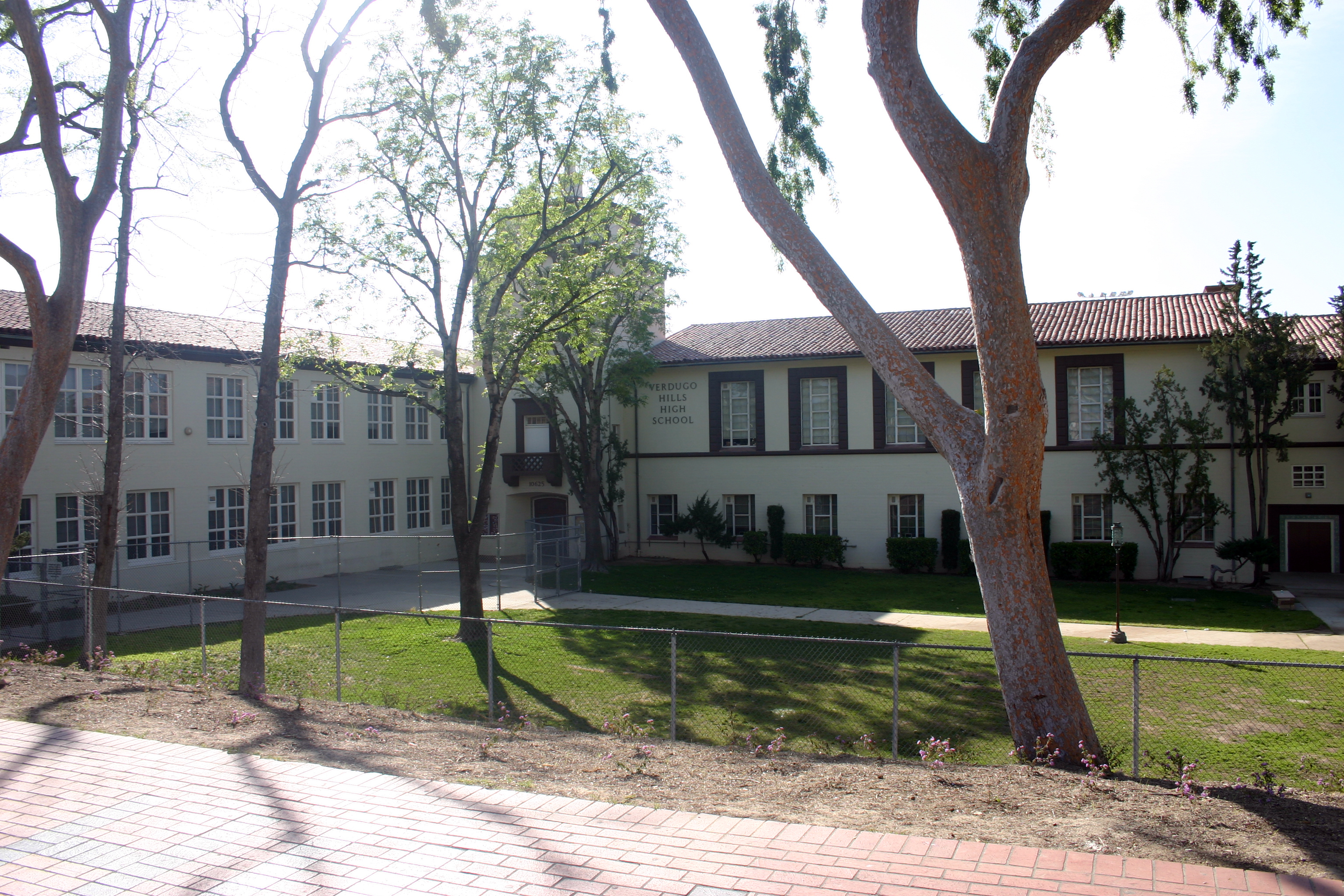
Verdugo Hills High School in 2012

Schools within the Sunland-Tujunga boundaries are:

==== Public ====
- Mount Gleason Middle School, 10965 Mount Gleason Avenue, Sunland
- Sunland Elementary School, 8350 Hillrose Street, Sunland
- Apperson Street Elementary School, 10233 Woodward Avenue, Sunland
- Verdugo Hills High School, 10625 Plainview Avenue, Tujunga
- Plainview Avenue Elementary School, 10819 Plainview Avenue, Tujunga
- Mt. Lukens Continuation School, 7705 Summitrose Street, Tujunga
- Pinewood Avenue Elementary School, 10111 Silverton Avenue, Tujunga
- Mountain View Elementary School, 6410 Olcott Street, Tujunga

==== Private ====
- Trinity Christian School, 10614 Oro Vista Avenue, Sunland
- Fairhaven Christian Academy, 10438 Oro Vista Avenue, Sunland
- Canyon View Academy, 8100 McGroarty Street, Sunland
- Our Lady of Lourdes School, elementary, 7324 Apperson Street
- Smart Academy / Christian, 7754 McGroarty Street, Tujunga
- Crescenta Valley Adventist School, 6245 Honolulu Avenue, La Crescenta (within Tujunga, now closed)

=== Scholastic history ===
==== Joining LAUSD ====
In its early years, Sunland had its own school district—called Monte Vista—and Tujunga was also served by its own district. In March 1926, Tujunga voters approved a bond issue for a 20-acre (81,000 m^{2}) high school site. By 1927 Tujunga had two schools built in "quaint Spanish style" for 400 pupils. On January 8, 1929, the county Board of Supervisors approved a petition drafted by Tujungans to join the Los Angeles School District.

==== Shadow Hills boundary, 1966–1976 ====
A 1966 plan to require students of the equestrian community of Shadow Hills, Los Angeles, to switch from the overcrowded and virtually all-White Mount Gleason Junior High School in Sunland to the more diversified Maclay Junior High in Pacoima was opposed by the Shadow Hills Homeowners Association. A charge of de facto segregation was made by Los Angeles Valley College instructor John Buchanan, who lived in Pacoima, and by the Sunland-Tujunga Human Relations Council, whose president, Paul Tsuneishi, said overcrowding at Mt. Gleason resulted in classes being held on an auditorium stage, a corrective physical education room, and a multipurpose room. Shadow Hills, midway between the two schools, was an optional attendance area for either school, and 215 of its children were attending Mount Gleason, versus just 22 at Maclay. One African-American was among the 2,030 students enrolled at Mount Gleason, while 25% of the 1,200 students at Maclay were African-American and 27% were Mexican-American.

Glenn Haschenburger, president of the homeowners' association, denied the charge, stating, "We were not even aware of the racial composition at Maclay." He added that students were not taking a school bus to Maclay because, "We believe riding and caring for horses is part of producing good citizens. They can't ride horses if they spend all their time riding buses to and from school."

The Los Angeles school board approved the boundary switch in a 4-3 vote on July 14, 1966. The Times reported:

Nearly 200 persons who filled the board meeting room greeted the action with boos and catcalls, "My child will never go to Maclay!" and "The Communists started to take over in 1928!"

On September 19, 1966, a procession of about 40 cars followed a hearse from the edge of Shadow Hills to Mount Gleason Junior High, parents paraded with picket signs, and leaders "removed a model red schoolhouse from the hearse and laid it in front of a mock headstone" as a eulogy to the concept of the neighborhood school.

Staff writer Jerry Cohen of the Los Angeles Times reported that:

A lengthening shadow hovers across the sunny, foothill community of Shadow Hills, the shadow of racial tension.. . . a pervasive bitterness has spread through the quiet neighborhood. . . Neighbor is set against neighbor;. . . old friendships have dissolved.. . . Even churches and youth groups, the Boy and Girl Scouts, have been splintered by bitterness. Root of the discord is the dispute over which junior high school Shadow Hills children should attend.

The Times article was attacked by Edward L. Fike, editor and publisher of the Record-Ledger newspaper of Sunland-Tujunga, who wrote, "The suspicion grows and grows that the Board of Education by a one-vote margin knowingly sacrificed the Shadow Hills neighborhood upon the altar of forced integration as demanded by agitators and by the U. S. government as its price for federal aid."

Nine years later, the boundary change was said to have actually led to a drop in enrollment at Maclay, as parents, both White and minority, moved their students elsewhere, sometimes through falsifying addresses and sometimes through a so-called statement of residence in which parents asserted their children would be living with somebody else five nights a week within a different school's boundaries. About this circumstance, Mike Castro of the Los Angeles Times wrote:

Mrs. Edna Susank, principal of Mt. Gleason Junior High in Sunland, said that discussions with parents when a false address is discovered reveals an adamant attitude, sometimes with table thumping, that they will not send their child to an inferior school.

==== Cross-district busing, 1977–1981 ====
Sunland-Tujunga residents were foremost in a fight against mandatory busing for the purpose of school desegregation in Los Angeles.

On January 21, 1977, an estimated 4,000 students—about half the total enrollment—stayed away from classes at nine Sunland-Tujunga schools as parents, led by Samm Ferris of Sunland, staged a one-day boycott to protest any idea of mandatory busing. About 35 "concerned mothers" picketed three elementary schools, as well as Mount Gleason Junior High and Verdugo Hills High schools.

In May of the same year, Donna Kent of Sunland-Tujunga became president of the local chapter of Bustop, a citywide group opposed to the busing program. She said her chapter managed to raise $1,000 of the $5,000 needed monthly for lawyers, by holding raffles, rummage sales, and Tupperware parties.

In August 1980, as the school district was making plans to bus some students from Sunland Elementary School to Pacoima, about 100 parents met at the school to protest. Parent Betty Reeve said she and others had organized a "Yellow Flu" campaign to keep students away from school and show that "our kids are sick of riding a yellow school bus."

Nevertheless, a busing procedure resulted in White elementary students from Apperson Street, Sunland, Plainview Avenue, and Mountain View elementary schools in Sunland-Tujunga being exchanged with minority counterparts in Lake View Terrace, Sun Valley, and North Hollywood. Mount Gleason Junior High and Verdugo Hills High Schools did not take part. Mandatory busing was ended by a decision of the California Supreme Court on March 12, 1981, and when the practice was finally stopped the next month, most of the Sunland-Tujunga pupils returned to their neighborhood schools, but most of the previously enrolled minority students continued to be bused into Sunland-Tujunga on a voluntary basis.

==== 'Parent trigger', 2010 ====
By February 2010 Mount Gleason Middle School had been on a federal list of under-performing campuses for 12 years, and a group of parents organized to take advantage of a new state law in an attempt to force administrative changes. The law, dubbed the "parent trigger", could compel districts to take drastic action to fix failing schools if a majority of parents petitioned for an overhaul. In an interview, four parents told CNN reporter Thelma Gutierrez in October 2010 that Mount Gleason was unsafe and they wanted the principal ousted. An official of the Los Angeles Unified School District messaged CNN that the school had followed proper procedures and had taken "corrective action."

== Infrastructure ==
Police protection
The Los Angeles Police Department's Foothill Community Police Station in Pacoima serves Sunland and Tujunga.

Fire protection
Los Angeles Fire Department operates two stations: Station 24 in Sunland and Station 74 in Tujunga.

Health protection
The Los Angeles County Department of Health Services operates the Glendale Health Center in Glendale, serving Sunland-Tujunga.

Library
The Los Angeles Public Library operates the Sunland-Tujunga branch in Tujunga.

== Parks and recreation ==
Sunland Park was originally known as Monte Vista Park.

The Haines Canyon Park in Tujunga is an undeveloped park used for brush clearance. It is open to visitors from dawn to dusk; however, the Los Angeles Park Department said that it does not recommend the park for public use.

The Sunland Recreation Center serves as a police department stop-in center. It has a 250-seat gymnasium that is also used as an auditorium. In addition, the facility has a lighted baseball diamond, lighted outdoor basketball courts, a children's play area, a community room, a lighted athletic field, picnic tables, and tennis courts. Annual events there include the Easter Carnival and the Watermelon Carnival in mid-August. In addition, the Verdugo Mountain Park is east of central Sunland and south of La Tuna Canyon Road.

Howard Finn Park, named after the city council member who died in 1986, is a 2-acre (8,100 m^{2}) park opened in late 1990 behind the Sunland-Tujunga Municipal Building.

Fehlhaber-Houk Park was built at the northwest corner of Tujunga Canyon Boulevard and Elmhurst Drive on a 1.2-acre (4,900 m^{2}) vacant lot donated by brother and sister J.L. Houk and Elizabeth Swanson in 1975. The parcel had been part of a 58-acre (230,000 m^{2}) ranch owned by Raymond and Irene Fehlhaber.

== Political representation ==
=== Electoral districts ===
The area is within the following political districts:

- California's 30th congressional district, represented by Democrat Laura Friedman
- the 25th senatorial district, represented by Democrat Sasha Renée Pérez
- the 39th Assembly district, represented by Democrat Juan Carrillo
- Fifth Los Angeles County Supervisorial District, represented by Kathryn Barger of San Marino.
- Los Angeles City Council District 7, represented by Monica Rodriguez of San Fernando.

=== Neighborhood council ===
- The Sunland-Tujunga Neighborhood Council (STNC): Board of representatives includes 21 elected positions and one appointed position whose purpose is to listen to and communicate resident's needs, ideas, and concerns to appropriate public agencies, city, county and state. STNC's representatives are involved, in an advisory capacity, with city budget planning, city development plans, officially address our community and city issues with governmental officials and departments. The STNC has a $37,000 Neighborhood Council Funding budget annually to allocate to community improvement projects, outreach, and Council operations. STNC website: stnc.org

== Media ==
The Sunland-Tujunga area is served by the newspapers the Voice, the Foothill Record, the North Valley Reporter, and the Crescenta Valley Weekly.

== Points of historical interest ==
- Bolton Hall is a historic American Craftsman-era stone building in Tujunga. Built in 1913, it was originally used as a community center for the Utopian community of Los Terrenitos. From 1920 until 1957, it was used as an American Legion hall, the San Fernando Valley's second public library, Tujunga City Hall, and a jail. In 1957, the building was closed. For more than 20 years, Bolton Hall remained vacant and was the subject of debates over demolition and restoration. Since 1980, it has been operated by the Little Landers Historical Society as a local history museum containing artifacts, photographs, documents, the old clock from the first Tujunga Post Office, and memorabilia of Sunland-Tujunga and the foothill area.
- McGroarty Arts Center is Historic Cultural Monument No. 63 of the City of Los Angeles. It was built in 1923 by John McGroarty, poet, Los Angeles Times columnist, and author who served two terms as a Democratic congressman from California. The building now offers instruction in art, music, and performance exhibitions, and hosts cultural events.

== Filming location ==
E.T. the Extra-Terrestrial was filmed in some parts of Tujunga, including the house in which Elliot lived.

Portions of Corvette Summer starring Mark Hamill were filmed at Verdugo Hills High School.

In the past, Ben-Hur raced his chariot in Big Tujunga Canyon, and Lancaster Lake (now long since gone) adjacent to Sunland Park was home to Tarzan^{which?} in the jungle hunk's first silver screen epics. All The King's Men,^{which?} Mildred Pierce, The Birth of a Nation, Meet John Doe, The Craft, Ernest Goes to Camp, and River's Edge (1986, with Keanu Reeves) are a few of the numerous films shot in Sunland-Tujunga. Also, parts of Teen Wolf and Sons of Anarchy were shot there.

The Travel Inn, located on Foothill Blvd in Tujunga, is one of the filming locations for both Seven Pounds and Memento.

A CHiPs episode of season five (1981) was filmed at the Foothill Blvd and Mather Avenue intersection.

== Notable people ==
=== Residents ===
- David Ackles (1937–1999), singer and songwriter
- Renée Adorée (1898–1933), French actress
- Greg Burson (1949–2008), voice actor and impressionist
- James P. Cannon (1890–1974), leader in the Socialist Workers Party
- Sonia Greene Davis (1883–1972), journalist and businesswoman
- Harry Carr (1877–1936), newspaper columnist
- Saralyn R. Daly (1924–2018), university professor
- Wavy Gravy (born 1936), 1960s peace activist and Merry Prankster
- Teri Hatcher, actress
- Ernst Krenek (1901 – 1991), composer
- Louis R. Nowell (1915–2000), Los Angeles City Council member, 1963–1977
- Frederick W. Plaisted, ex-governor of Maine
- Alvah Curtis Roebuck, co-founder of Sears.
- Bill Scott (1920–1985), writer and voice actor
- Judy Shapiro-Ikenberry (born 1942), long-distance runner
- Giancarlo Stanton (born 1989), Major League Baseball player
- Ryan Starr, rock singer and finalist on the first season of American Idol
- The Smothers Brothers, television actors
- Maja Trochimczyk (born 1957), poet
- Paul Walker (1973–2013), actor
- Jaye P. Morgan (born 1931), singer and actress

=== Verdugo Hills High School students ===
- Randy Bobb (1948–1982), Major League Baseball catcher
- Jan Brewer (born 1944), 22nd governor of Arizona (2009–2015)
- Bob James (born 1958), Major League Baseball pitcher
- Howard McKeon (born 1938), member of the House of Representatives
- Jaye P. Morgan (born 1931), singer
- John Purdell (1959–2003), musician and record producer

== See also ==
Nearby communities, cities or areas

- Burbank, California
- Crescenta Valley
- Glendale, California
- La Crescenta, California
- Lake View Terrace, Los Angeles
- San Fernando Valley
- Tujunga Wash
- Verdugo Mountains

Other articles

- California State Route 118, formerly the Sunland Freeway
- Floods, 1978
- Andrew Glassell, who purchased Rancho Tujunga in 1875
- Picture-winged fly named Tujunga
- The Station wildfire of 2009 near Sunland-Tujunga
- Sunland Boulevard
- Tongva language
- Verdugo Hills Cemetery landslide, 1978
- Won't Back Down (film), a 2012 motion picture loosely based on Sunland-Tujunga's experience with the "parent trigger law"
