= Bolton Hall (activist) =

American lawyer, author, and Georgist

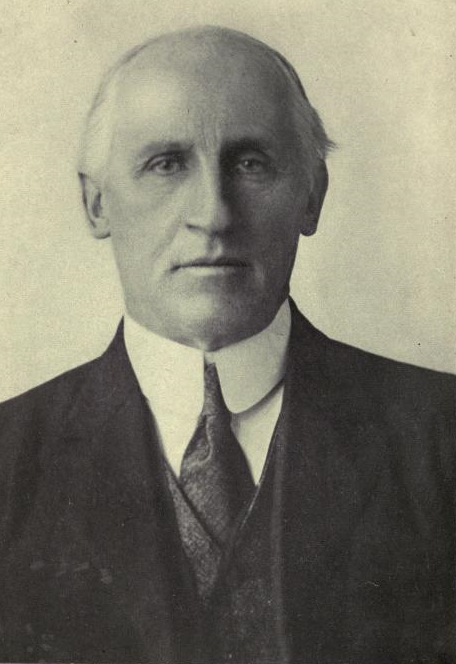
- Hall in 1917
- Born: August 5, 1854; Ireland
- Died: December 10, 1938 (aged 84); Thomasville, Georgia, U.S.
- Occupations: Lawyer, author, and activist
- Years active: 1898–1916
- Known for: Starting the back-to-the-land movement
- Notable work: A Little Land and a Living

Bolton Hall (August 5, 1854 – December 10, 1938) was an American lawyer, author, and Georgism activist who worked on behalf of the poor and started the back-to-the-land movement in the United States at the beginning of the 20th century.

== Early life and education ==
Hall was born in Ireland on August 5, 1854, the son of the Rev. John Hall, who later became pastor of the Fifth Avenue Presbyterian Church in New York City. Because he was a teenager when the family came to the United States in 1868, he continued to speak English with an Irish accent. In 1875, he was graduated from Princeton University (where he rowed crew). He received his law degree from Columbia Law School in 1881.

It was reported after the death of the elder Hall in 1898 that the minister had disinherited Bolton "because of the latter's friendly attitude to labor and his friendship for Henry George and his belief in the single tax." Bolton Hall denied the report. (Note: Published details of John Hall's will state that (upon the death of his wife) his children were to receive equal shares of the estate apart from Bolton who was only to receive the interest from his share.)

== Career ==
Hall was a prolific writer of books and pamphlets.

Around 1886, Hall was a member of the export firm of McCarty and Hall, which failed that year. He filed for bankruptcy but withdrew the action after settling with creditors.

== Activism ==
Hall was active on behalf of various progressive movements. He was an admirer of Pierre-Joseph Proudhon, French politician, philosopher and socialist, of Benjamin R. Tucker, editor and publisher of the individualist anarchist periodical Liberty, and Leo Tolstoy, the Russian novelist, pacifist and Christian anarchist. He was opposed to Marxism and agreed with classical liberal political theorist Herbert Spencer, who called it "the coming slavery."

Hall was an early leader of the American Longshoremen's Union in New York City, established with the help of British socialist and trade unionist Tom Mann as part of a cross-Atlantic organizing drive for all maritime workers. In 1898, serving as general treasurer of that labor organization, he drew condemnation from delegates to New York City's Central Labor Union because he submitted a motion to oppose opening a Spanish–American War inasmuch as the latter country had agreed to arbitration in the Havana, Cuba, sinking of the battleship Maine. The motion lost by a small margin.

Before 1908 he established the Vacant Lot Gardening Association in New York City, which grew to "about 200 members" who "conducted a number of experiments in and near New York during its existence." One of them included the use of 30 acres of land on Bronxdale Avenue, near White Plains Road, "which the Astor estate had allowed us to use and on which a number of families had been living." Afterward, the association used property on Dyckman Street near Prescott Avenue, not for cultivation, but for the establishment of a tent city. The difficulty in getting free land for "vacant lot gardening" led Hall to establish the Little Land League, whose idea was to buy property no more than 90 minutes from New York for a training school, "and the people who have proved capable there we shall put on their feet as farmers on a larger piece of land further away." In 1909 he made a trip to Europe to study vacant-lot gardening.

In 1910 he deeded some 68 acres (280,000 m^{2}) of land to establish the egalitarian community of Free Acres in Berkeley Heights, New Jersey, under which the residents pay only a single tax on land values to the community, which, in turn, pays a lump sum to the city. Improvements such as buildings were not to be taxed, but only the value of the land.

On June 5, 1916, he was arrested along with Ida Rauh on a misdemeanor charge of distributing pamphlets on birth control at a public meeting in Manhattan's Union Square on May 20 of that year.

He was a disciple of Henry George and one of the leading exponents of the single-tax theory. He was opposed to Tammany Hall, the organization that dominated the political life of the city in the early 20th century. He founded the New York Tax Reform Association.

== Personal life and demise ==
He and Susie Hurlbut Scott were married in 1884 and they had a son, John Hoyt Hall, who died at 14 in 1911, and one daughter, Lois, who later married Gerard P. Herrick.

He died on December 10, 1938, at the age of 84 while visiting Thomasville, Georgia, on the advice of his physician.

After providing for his wife and daughter, Hall bequeathed his residuary estate and $2,000 to the Henry George School of Social Science in New York City, to which he had contributed generously. In 1913, an admirer, George Harris, built Bolton Hall in Tujunga, California—a structure that is now on the National Register of Historic Places.

== Bibliography ==
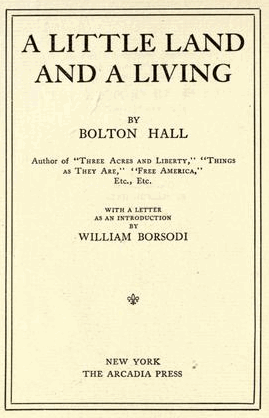
Cover of a 1908 book by Bolton Hall

Hall was the author of:

- Sir Evelyn's Charge; or, a Child's Influence (1887)
- Who Pays Your Taxes? (1892)
- Even as You and I (1897 or 1900)
- The Iron Ore Trust (1899)
- Things as They Are (1899 or 1909)
- Free America (1904)
- Three Acres and Liberty (1907)
- A Little Land and a Living (1908)
- Money Making in Free America (1909)
- The Game of Life (1909)
- Life and Love and Peace (1909)
- The Garden Yard (1911)
- What Tolstoy Taught (1911)
- The Gift of Sleep (1911)
- The Mastery of Grief (1913)
- Thrift (1916)
- The Psychology of Sleep (1917)
- The Halo of Grief (1919)
- The New Thrift (1923)
- The Living Bible: The Whole Bible in Its Fewest Words (1928)
