= United Labor Party (New York City) =

Alliance of labor unions

- Abbreviation: ULP
- Founded: 1886; 140 years ago
- Dissolved: 1888; 138 years ago
- Succeeded by: People's Party; Socialist Labor Party
- Ideology: Laborism; Factions: Georgism; Socialism
- Political position: Left-wing

The United Labor Party was a short-lived alliance of 115 different labor unions and labor parties including the Central Labor Union, Knights of Labor, and the Socialist Labor Party.

== History ==
=== Origins ===
The ULP was formed as a response to the rising "red scare" following the Haymarket Affair.

=== Henry George mayoral campaign ===
"Wanted, a Leader! — The Labor-Agitation Orchestra on the Go-As-You-Please Plan" a political cartoon by Frederick Burr Opper published in Puck depicting the divisions in the United Labor Party, December 22, 1886

After the formation of the ULP, party leaders reached out to Henry George and asked him to be their candidate for Mayor of New York City in 1886. George, who was sympathetic enough to labor to run under their banner but also educated enough to be a viable candidate, eventually agreed after seeing 36,000 signatures in support of him. George came in second place, ahead of Republican candidate Theodore Roosevelt but behind the Democratic candidate Abram Hewitt.

The ULP also unsuccessfully contested the 1887 Philadelphia mayoral election with Tomas Phillips as their candidate.

=== Split ===
After the 1886 election, there was heavy conflict between the Georgist and the Socialist factions of the party, leading to a split in 1887 which ended the alliance.

== Members ==
- Henry George, economist, candidate for Mayor of New York City (1886)
- James J. Coogan, merchant, candidate for Mayor of New York City (1888), future Borough President of Manhattan
- John Vincent, lawyer, candidate for Justice of the New York Supreme Court (1887), former New York County District Attorney
- James A. O'Gorman, lawyer, candidate for Justice of the New York City Civil Court (1887), future United States Senator
- Louis F. Post, newspaper editor, chairman of the 1887 party convention, future United States Assistant Secretary of Labor
- Laurence Gronlund, writer, delegate to the 1887 party convention
- John McMackin, delegate to the 1887 party convention, future New York State Labor Commissioner
- Sergei Shevitch, newspaper editor, delegate to the 1887 party convention
- Walter Vrooman, educationalist, delegate to the 1887 party convention

== Supporters ==
- Jacob Ralph Abarbanell, playwright
- Lillie Devereux Blake, suffragist
- Thomas Davidson, professor
- Benjamin Franklin DeCosta, Episcopalian priest
- Samuel Gompers, President of the Federation of Organized Trades and Labor Unions
- Daniel De Leon, lecturer
- Edward Bliss Foote, doctor
- Patrick Ford, journalist
- Richard J. Hinton, journalist
- Robert G. Ingersoll, orator
- Tom L. Johnson, industrialist
- James G. Maguire, Judge of the San Francisco County Superior Court
- Charles H. Matchett, socialist
- Edward McGlynn, Catholic priest
- R. Heber Newton, Episcopalian priest
- Terence V. Powderly, Grand Master Workman of the Knights of Labor
- James Redpath, journalist
- Sylvanus H. Sweet, former New York State Engineer and Surveyor (1874–1875)
- John Swinton, journalist
- Gideon J. Tucker, former New York Secretary of State
- Charles F. Wingate, philanthropist
