= 1886 New York City mayoral election =

- November 2, 1886
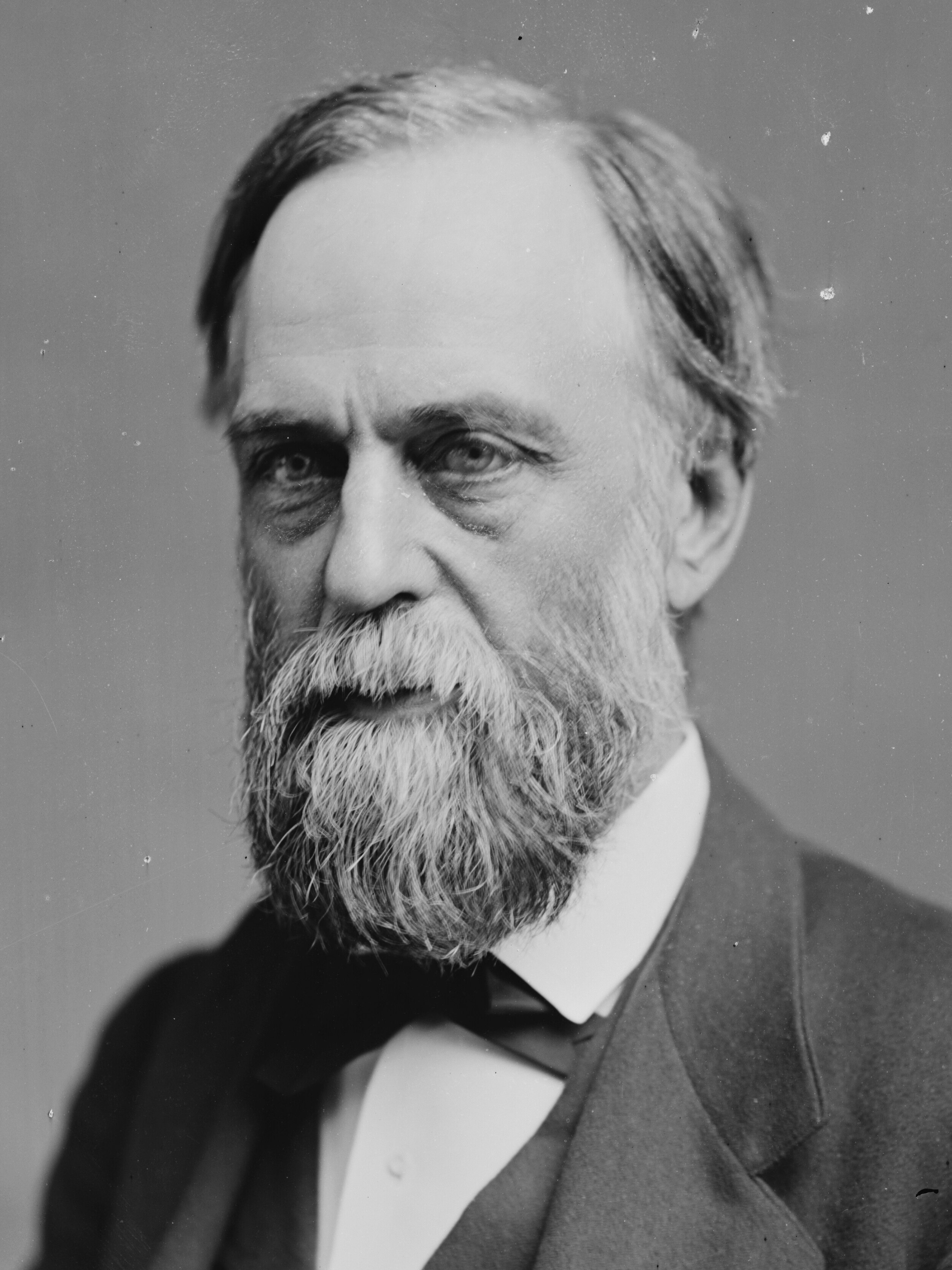

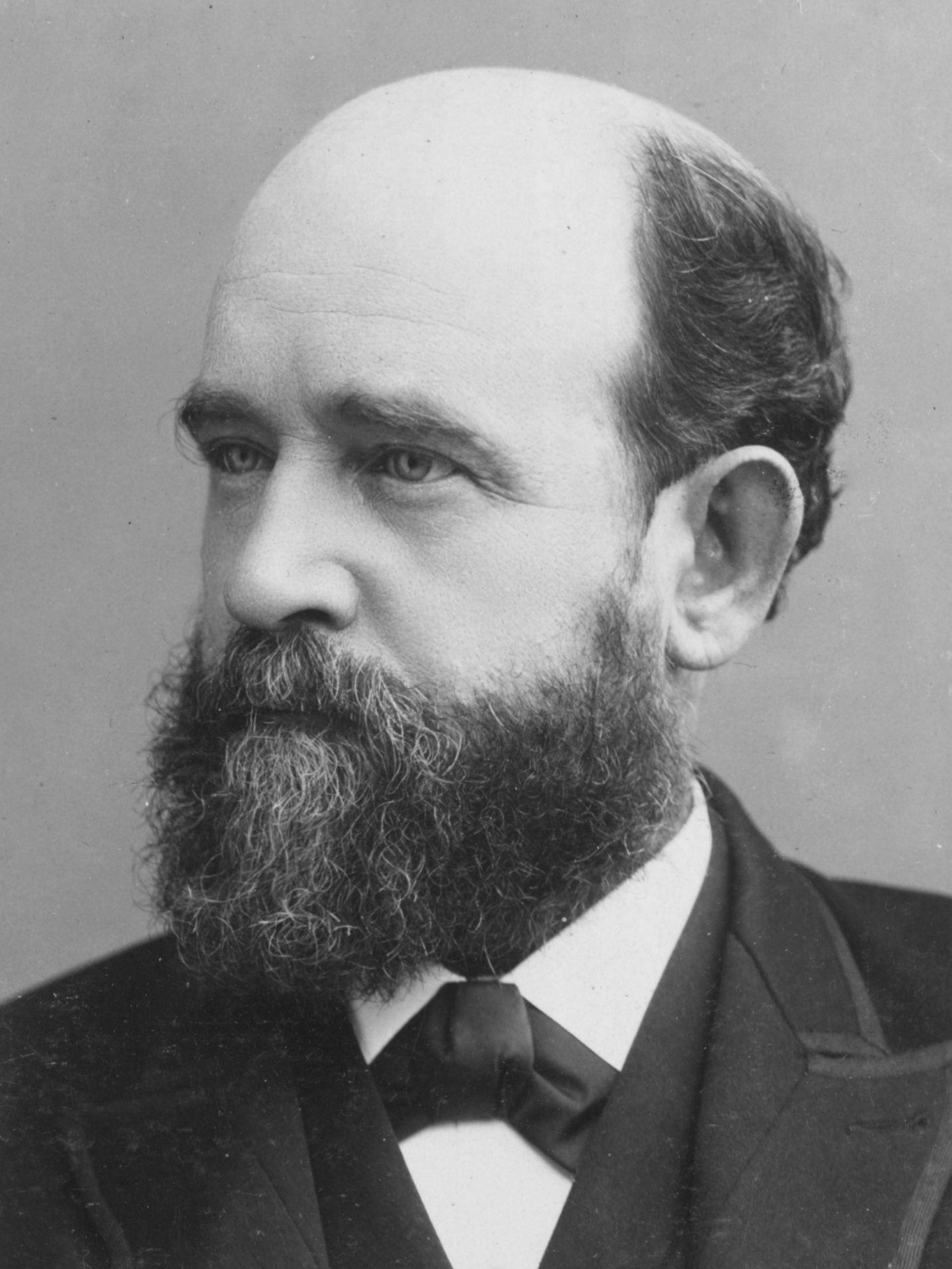

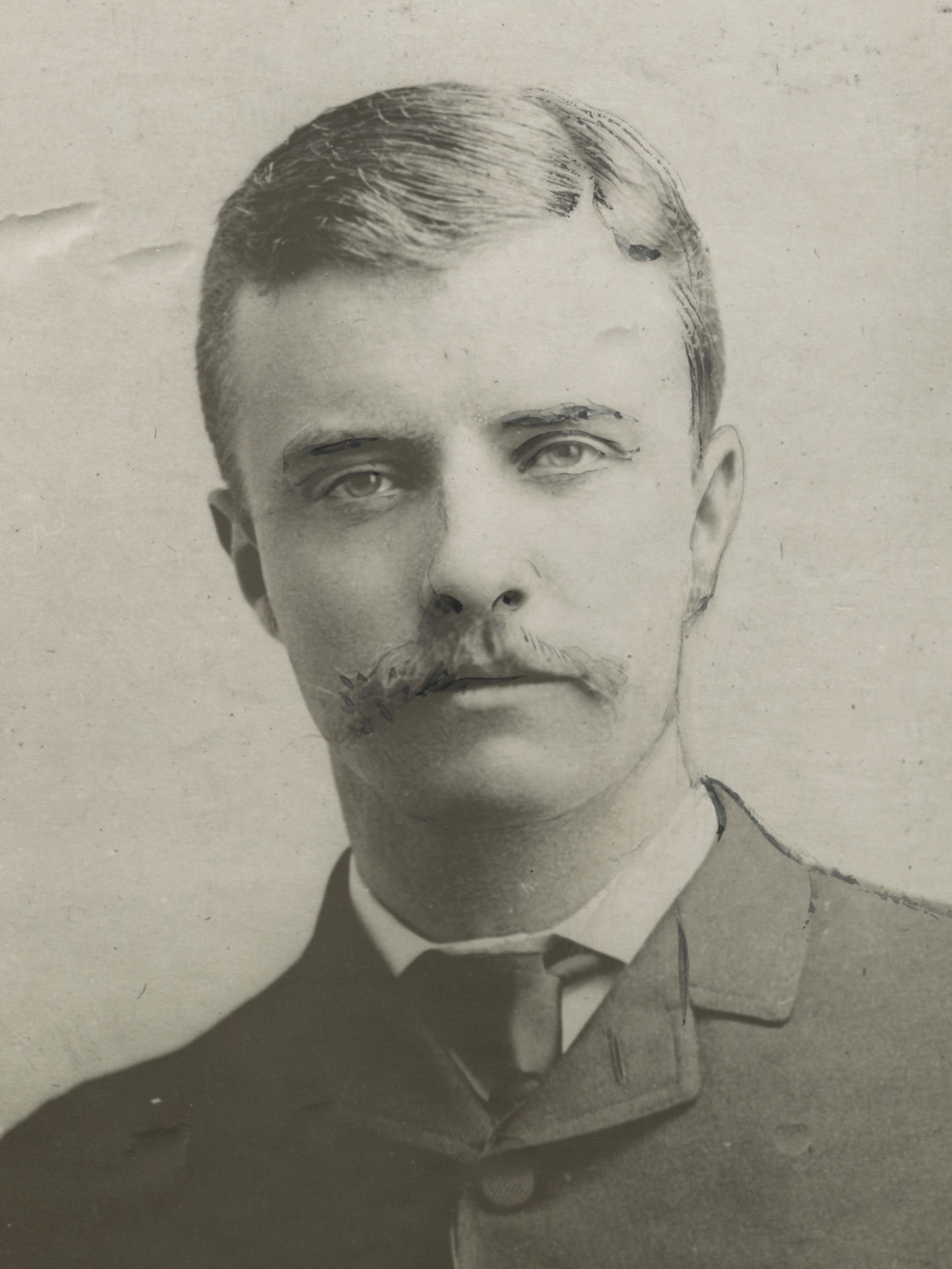
Nominee	Abram Hewitt	Henry George	Theodore Roosevelt
Party	Democratic	United Labor	Republican
Popular vote	90,552	68,110	60,435
Percentage	41.2%	31.0%	27.5%
- Ward results Hewitt: 30–40% 40–50% 50–60% 60–70% George: 30–40% 40–50% Roosevelt: 40–50% 50–60%
Mayor before election
William Russell Grace
Independent
Elected mayor
Abram Hewitt
Democratic

An election for Mayor of New York City was held on November 2, 1886.

Candidates included four-term former state assemblyman Theodore Roosevelt, economist Henry George, and five-term U.S. Representative Abram Hewitt. Roosevelt, at age 28, would have been the youngest mayor in New York City history had he been elected.

The election saw many Republican voters swing their support to Hewitt.

== Campaign ==
- Henry George, political economist and land tax reformer (United Labor)
- Abram Hewitt, U.S. Representative and former chair of the Democratic National Committee (Democratic)
- Theodore Roosevelt, former Assemblyman from the Upper East Side (Republican)
- William T. Wardwell (Prohibition)

Daniel De Leon, the future leader of the Socialist Labor Party of America, campaigned for George.

== Results ==
New York City mayoral election, 1886
Party	Candidate	Votes	%
Democratic	Abram Hewitt	90,552	41.23
United Labor	Henry George	68,110	31.01
Republican	Theodore Roosevelt	60,435	27.52
Prohibition	William T. Wardwell	532	0.24
Democratic gain from nonpartisan candidate			

== Works cited ==
- Foner, Philip (1977). American Socialism and Black Americans: From The Age of Jackson to World War II. Greenwood Publishing Group. ISBN 0837195454.
