= Cahuenga =

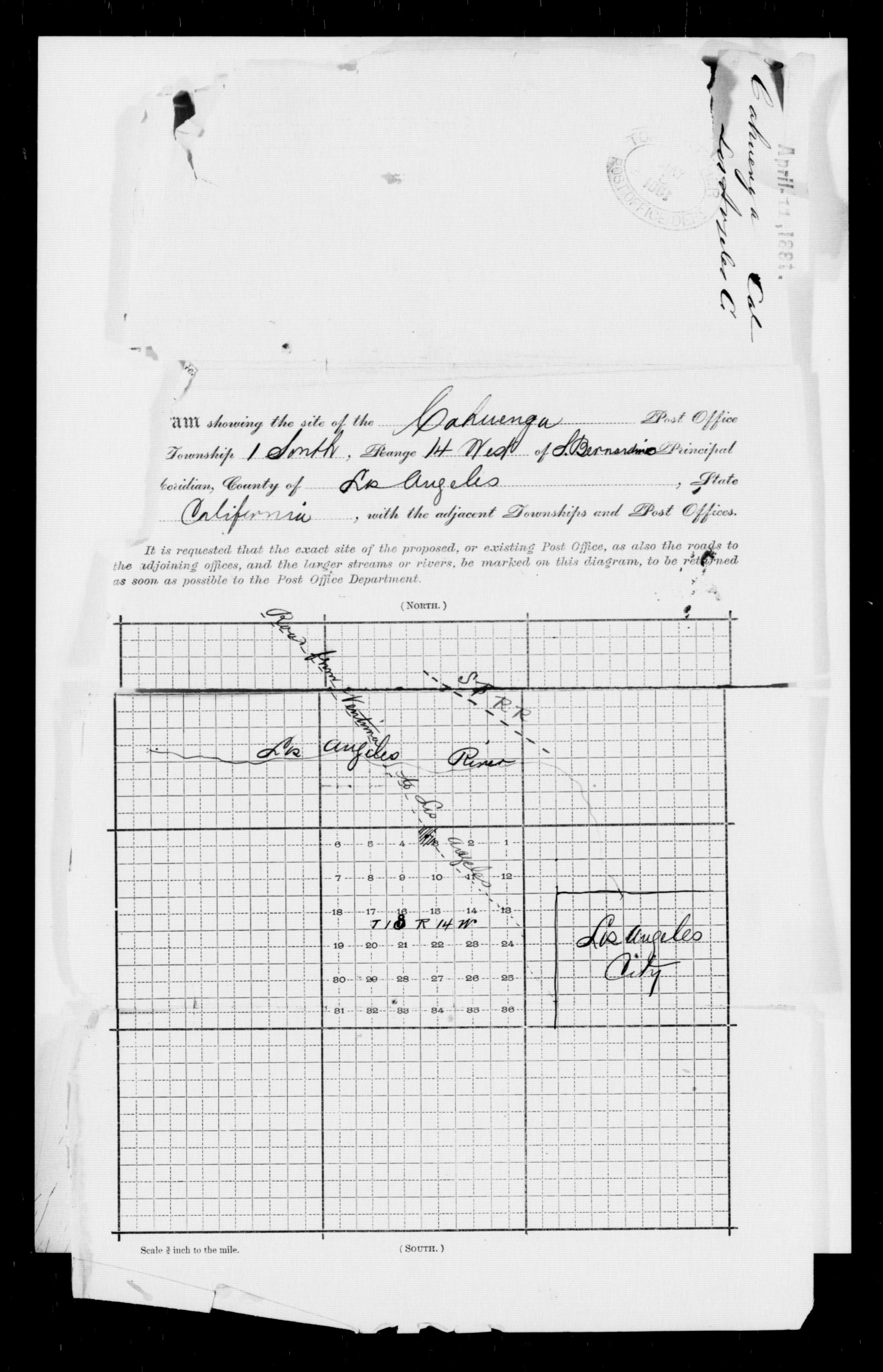
Cahuenga, Los Angeles, California mapped for an 1881 post office application

Cahuenga is a place name in California, United States. Caheunga may refer to:

- Campo de Cahuenga, a historic site
- Cahuenga, California, a Tongva-Kizh village
- Cahuenga Boulevard, a street
- Cahuenga Branch, a library
- Cahuenga Pass, a mountain pass
- Cahuenga Peak, a mountain
- Rancho Cahuenga, a historic land grant
