= History of Pasadena, California =

Historical population
Census	Pop.	Note	%±
1880	391		—
1890	4,882		1,148.6%
1900	9,117		86.7%
1910	30,291		232.2%
1920	45,354		49.7%
1930	76,086		67.8%
1940	81,864		7.6%
1950	104,577		27.7%
1960	116,407		11.3%
1970	112,951		−3.0%
1980	118,072		4.5%
1990	131,591		11.4%
2000	133,936		1.8%

Pasadena is a city in Los Angeles County, California, United States. Founded in 1874 and incorporated in 1886, the city is famous for its colorful history and for the hosting of both the Tournament of Roses Parade (since 1890) and the annual Rose Bowl game football game (since 1902). It is also the home of the California Institute of Technology (Caltech) and Jet Propulsion Laboratory (JPL)

== Indigenous culture and colonization ==
At the time of European contact, the inhabitants of Pasadena and surrounding areas were members of the Native American Indians Hahamog-na tribe, a branch of the Tongva Nation. They spoke the Tongva language (part of the Uto-Aztecan languages group) that lived in the Los Angeles Basin for thousands of years. Tongva dwellings lined the Arroyo Seco (Los Angeles County) in present-day Pasadena and south to where it joins the Los Angeles River and along other natural waterways in the city.

They lived in thatched, dome-shape lodges. For food, they lived on a diet of acorn meal, seeds and herbs, venison, and other small animals. They traded for ocean fish with the coastal Tongva. They made cooking vessels from steatite soapstone from Catalina Island. The oldest transportation route still in existence in Pasadena is the old Tongva foot trail, also known as the Gabrielino Trail, that goes along the west side of the Rose Bowl and up the Arroyo Seco past the Jet Propulsion Laboratory into the San Gabriel Mountains. That trail has been in continuous use for thousands of years. An arm of the trail is also still in use up what is now called Salvia Canyon. When the Spanish occupied the Los Angeles Basin they built the San Gabriel Mission and renamed the local Tongva people "Gabrielino Indians," after the name of the mission. Today, several bands of Tongva people live in the Los Angeles area.

== Early development ==
Pasadena is a part of the original Mexican land grant originally given over from Spain to Mexico, named Rancho del Rincon de San Pascual, so named because it was deeded on Easter Sunday to Eulalia Perez de Guillén Mariné of Mission San Gabriel Arcángel. The Rancho comprised the lands of today's communities of Pasadena, Altadena and South Pasadena.

Prior to the annexation of California in 1848, the last of the Mexican owners was Manuel Garfias who retained title to the property after statehood in 1850. Garfias sold sections of the property to the first Anglo settlers to come into the area: Benjamin Eaton, the father of Fred Eaton, and Dr. S. Griffin. Much of the property was purchased by Benjamin Wilson who established his Lake Vineyard property in the vicinity. Wilson, known as Don Benito to the local Indians, was also owner of the Rancho Jurupa (Riverside, California) and mayor of Los Angeles. He is the grandfather of WWII General George S. Patton, Jr. and had Mount Wilson named for him.

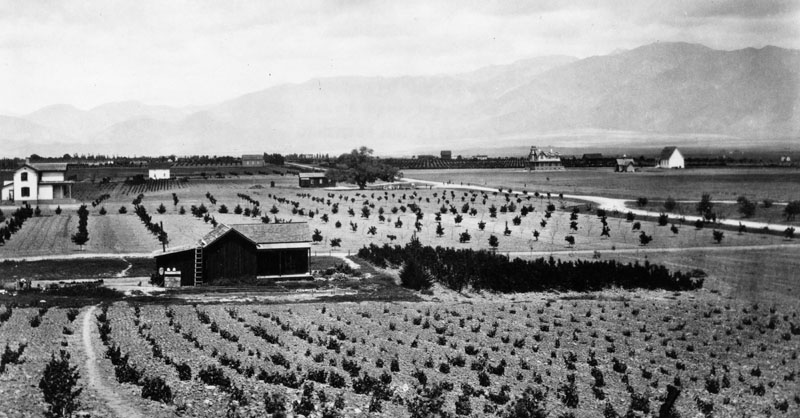
Pasadena, 1876.

In 1873, Wilson was visited by one Dr. Daniel M. Berry of Indiana who was looking for a place in the country that could offer better climate to his patients, most of whom suffered from tuberculosis . Berry was an asthmatic and claimed that he had his best three nights sleep at Rancho San Pascual. To keep the find a secret, Berry code-named the area "Muscat" after the grape that Wilson grew. To raise funds to bring the company of people to San Pascual, Berry formed the Southern California Orange and Citrus Growers Association for which he sold stock. The newcomers were able to purchase a large portion of the property along the Arroyo Seco and on January 31, 1874, they incorporated the Indiana Colony. As a gesture of good will, Wilson added 2,000 acres (8 km^{2}) of then useless highland property, part of which would become Altadena.

At the time, the Indiana Colony was a narrow strip of land between the Arroyo Seco and Fair Oaks Avenue. On the other side of the street was Wilson's Lake Vineyard development. After more than a decade of parallel development on both sides, the two settlements merged into the City of Pasadena.

=== Origin of name ===
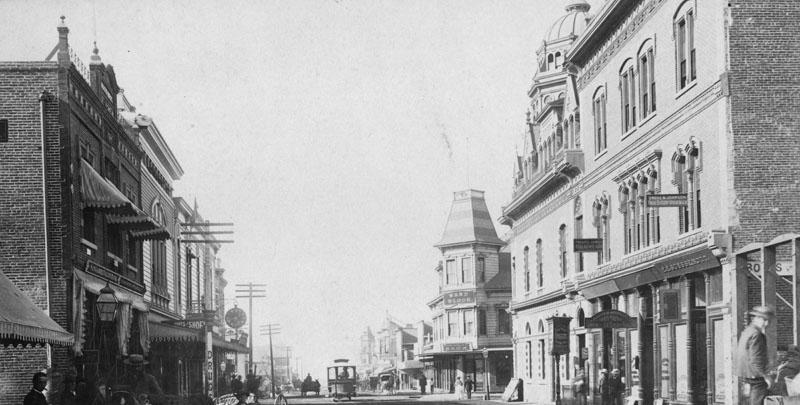
Colorado Blvd., 1890.

Prior to the 1890s, the mail was delivered to the Indiana Colony via Los Angeles. In an attempt to obtain their own post office, the Colony needed to change its name to something the Postmaster General considered appropriate. To this end the town fathers put three names up to a vote. The first was "Indianola," the second was "Granada," in keeping with the area's Spanish heritage. The third name was proposed by Dr. Thomas Elliott, who had contacted a missionary friend in Michigan who had worked with the Minnesota Chippewa Native Americans, although the Chippewa language had no ties to Southern California. He submitted four names for translation: "Crown of the Valley," "Key of the Valley," "Valley of the Valley," and "Hill of the Valley." All of the translations ended in "pa-sa-de-na," meaning "of the valley." Due to its euphonious nature, Pasadena was chosen, put to a vote, and accepted, though maps from the Wheeler Survey of 1878 show the names "Indiana Colony" and "Pasadena" in the same location. In March 1886, Pasadena became the second incorporated municipality, after the city of Los Angeles, in Los Angeles County.

In 1892, John H. Burnett of Galveston, Texas, visited Pasadena. After returning home, Burnett plotted a town along two bayous, with its similar lush vegetation, naming it Pasadena, after the California city.

== Pasadena as a resort town (1886–1941) ==
The popularity of the region drew people from across the country, and Pasadena eventually became a stop on the Atchison, Topeka and Santa Fe Railway, which led to an explosion in growth. A number of houses built in the area early in this period are on the National Register of Historic Places. From the real estate boom of the 1880s until the Great Depression, as great tourist hotels were developed in the city, Pasadena became a winter resort for wealthy Easterners, spurring the development of new neighborhoods and business districts, and increased road and transit connections with Los Angeles, culminating with the opening of the Arroyo Seco Parkway, California's first freeway. By 1940, Pasadena had become the eighth largest city in California and was considered by many to be a twin city to Los Angeles.

The first of the great hotels to be established in Pasadena was the Raymond (1886) atop Bacon Hill, renamed Raymond Hill after construction. The original Mansard Victorian 200 room facility burned down on Easter morning of 1895 and was not rebuilt until 1903. It was razed during the Great Depression to make way for residential development. The Maryland Hotel existed from the early 1900s and was demolished in 1937 to make way for the Pasadena branch of the Broadway Department Store. The world-famous Mount Lowe Railway and associated mountain hotels shut down four years later due to fire damage. Three hotel structures have survived, the Green Hotel (a co-op since 1926), the Vista Del Arroyo (now used as a Federal courthouse), and a residential tower of the Maryland at 80 North Euclid Avenue (a co-op since 1953).

=== Hotel Green ===
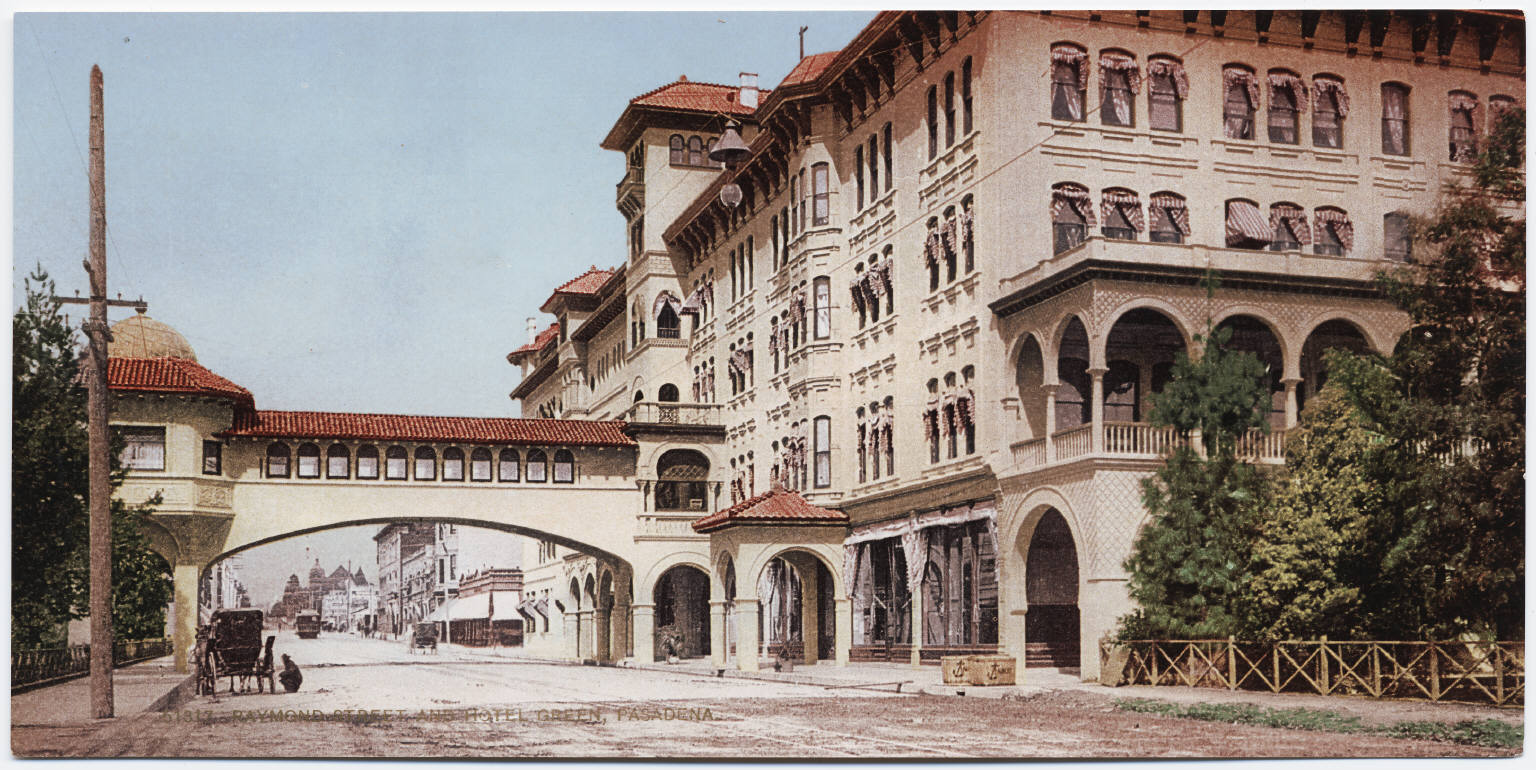
Hotel Green, 1900.

The Hotel Green started construction on South Raymond Avenue at Kansas Street in 1887 by Edward C. Webster who was unable to finish it. Colonel George Gill Green, a wealthy patent medicine distributor from New Jersey, finished the six story edifice in 1888. In 1898 he finished construction on a second building on the west side of Raymond and connected the two buildings with a bridge and a tunnel. The patrons arrived by train at the adjacent station. In 1902, the hotel was extended to the P.G. Wooster building at the corner of Fair Oaks Avenue and Green Street. In 1924, the hotel became a private residence. The original 1888 structure was later razed to its first story and sold. It is currently occupied by STATS Floral Supply. In 1970, the two wings of the remaining hotel were partitioned creating two separate buildings. The 1898 section remained the private residence now called the Castle Green. The 1902 portion was taken over by the government's HUD program for senior residents and disabled persons, and is called the Green Hotel. In 1929, Kansas Street was widened and renamed Green Street.

=== Vista del Arroyo ===
The Vista del Arroyo Hotel on Grand Avenue was commandeered by the Navy as a hospital, McCormack General Hospital, during World War II. It now houses the United States Court of Appeals for the Ninth Circuit.

== Craftsman era (1890s–1930s) ==
The American Craftsman era in art and design is exceptionally well represented in Pasadena. In architecture Greene and Greene, the Green Brothers firm, developed the style with many residences still existing. Two examples of their Ultimate bungalow versions are the masterpiece Gamble House (public tours), and the Robert R. Blacker House (private). Both are designated California Historical Landmarks and on the U.S. National Register of Historic Places.

=== Busch Gardens ===
Adolphus Busch was the co-founder of Anheuser-Busch, brewer of Budweiser beer. The wealthy easterner took full advantage of the area's mild climate and established the first of a series of Busch Gardens here. The first Busch Gardens opened in 1905 and closed to the public in 1937. During its time, it was one of the major tourist attractions in the Los Angeles area and offered many unique gardens and fairyland landscapes and structures. It was used as a location for several Hollywood motion pictures. After 1937 and the Second World War, much of the land was developed for homes. When Busch died at his Pasadena estate, his wife offered the home to the City of Pasadena, an offer the city refused. Close inspection of the location can still reveal many of the original river rock walls and structures of the gardens.

== World War II and aftermath (1941–1969) ==
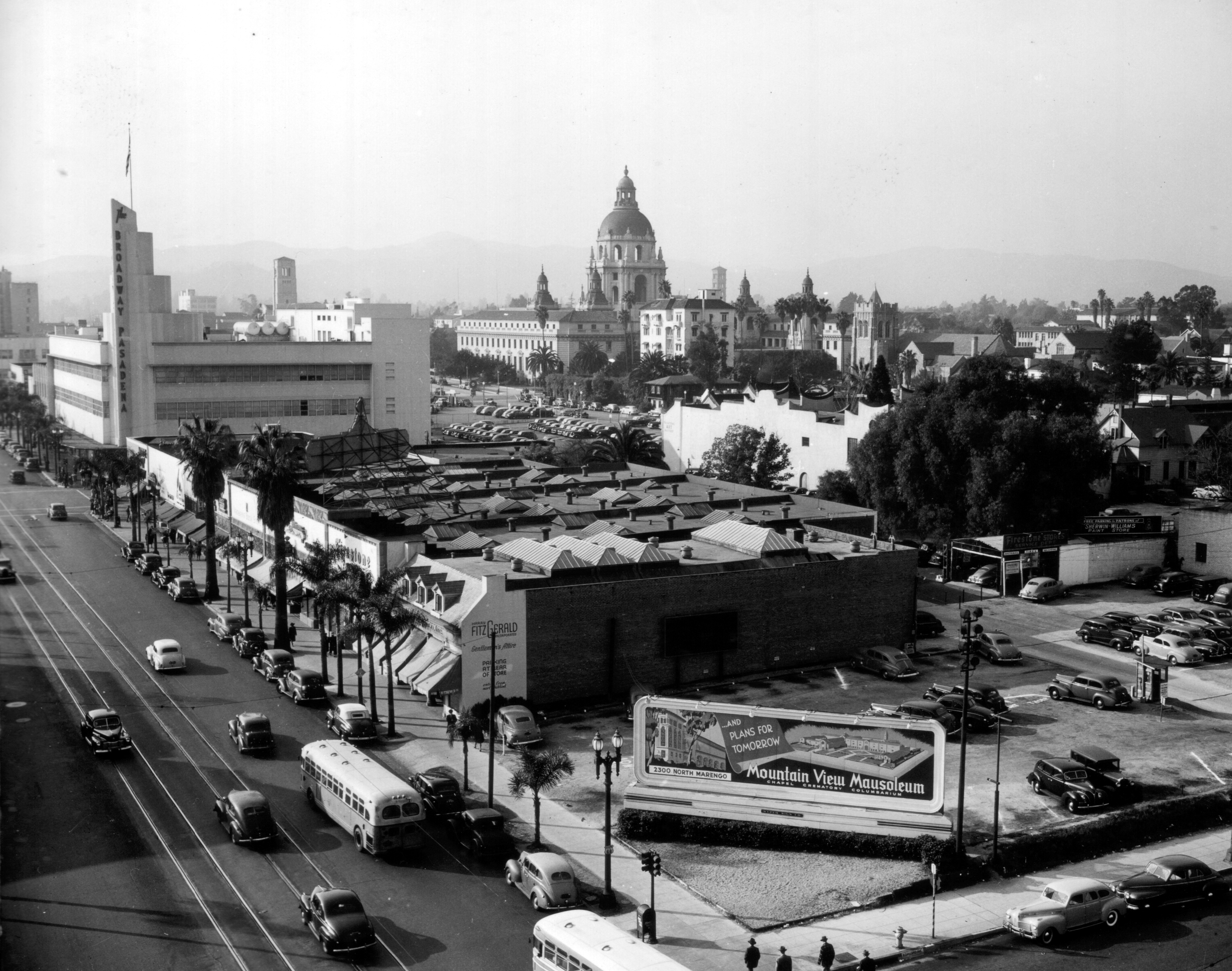
Downtown Pasadena in 1945.

The Second World War proved to be a boom to Pasadena as Southern California became a major staging area for the Pacific War. High tech manufacturing and scientific companies made the city their home, a trend which continued in the decades following the war, notably with NASA's Jet Propulsion Laboratory, Tetra Tech and Ameron International.

In the 1950s, Pasadena saw a steady influx of people from the Southern United States, especially African Americans from Texas and Louisiana. Pasadena also began hosting a large immigrant community, particularly from Guatemala, El Salvador, and Armenia.

== Pasadena since 1970 ==
The American Academy of Dramatic Arts, founded in 1884 in New York, opened its Pasadena campus in 1974. However, in 2001 the conservatory moved from Pasadena to Hollywood. Training actors for the stage in a two-year program, the conservatory was the first school in the United States to offer professional education in the field of acting. Point Loma Nazarene University was located in Pasadena for many years before moving to San Diego County, and held both the names of Pasadena University and Pasadena College.

In 1969, the Pasadena Unified School District was desegregated, though the issue would continue to be fought in court for a decade. A year later, the 210 Freeway was built along a newly chosen route. The freeway's construction was controversial, as it caused the demolition of over a thousand homes, many historic, and many claimed that the route was designed to cut off the city's less wealthy neighborhoods.

The situation did not improve. Downtown Pasadena became dangerous in some parts and deserted in others, and incidences of murder and arson skyrocketed. Old Pasadena faced destruction as plans for new high-rise developments were drawn up, though they were mostly stopped by increasingly active preservation advocates. Pasadena suffered demographically as many residents decamped for the nearby suburbs or the Inland Empire, causing an overall decrease in population. Despite these setbacks, many local artists and hipsters moved in to take advantage of low property values. Their legacy can be seen today in the Doo Dah Parade which began in 1976.

The 1970s also saw the meteoric rise of gang violence in Pasadena, a trend which culminated with the 1993 Halloween Massacre, wherein three teenagers were murdered by members of the Bloods and three more were wounded. This led the Pasadena Police Department to crack down far more heavily on gang activity, which receded in the mid-1990s.

In the early 2000s, several civic beautification campaigns began in earnest and many traditionally impoverished neighborhoods began gentrifying. The 2003 opening of the Los Angeles County Metro's Gold Line reopened Pasadena for rail rapid transit for the first time since 1951, and high-density condominiums began to pop up in the major business districts, leading to a major population increase. However, Pasadena's development has stalled due to the Great Recession, although much needed seismic retrofitting was completed on the City Hall building in summer 2007.

On November 8, 2022, Pasadena voters approved Ballot Measure H, with a 54 percent of the vote. It will create a Rental Board appointed by the City Council. Seven residents who reside in each of the seven City Council districts and are renters, are being chosen by the Council. Ballot Measure H was supported by the city's renters union and the Pasadena Unified School District's Board of Education, superintendent and school principals. Many renters have resided in the city for years.

== See also ==
- Hahamongna and Hahamog'na – local Tongva-Gabrieleño history
- List of ranchos of California
- Ranchos of California
- California Art Club
