= Crescenta Valley =

Valley in Los Angeles County, California

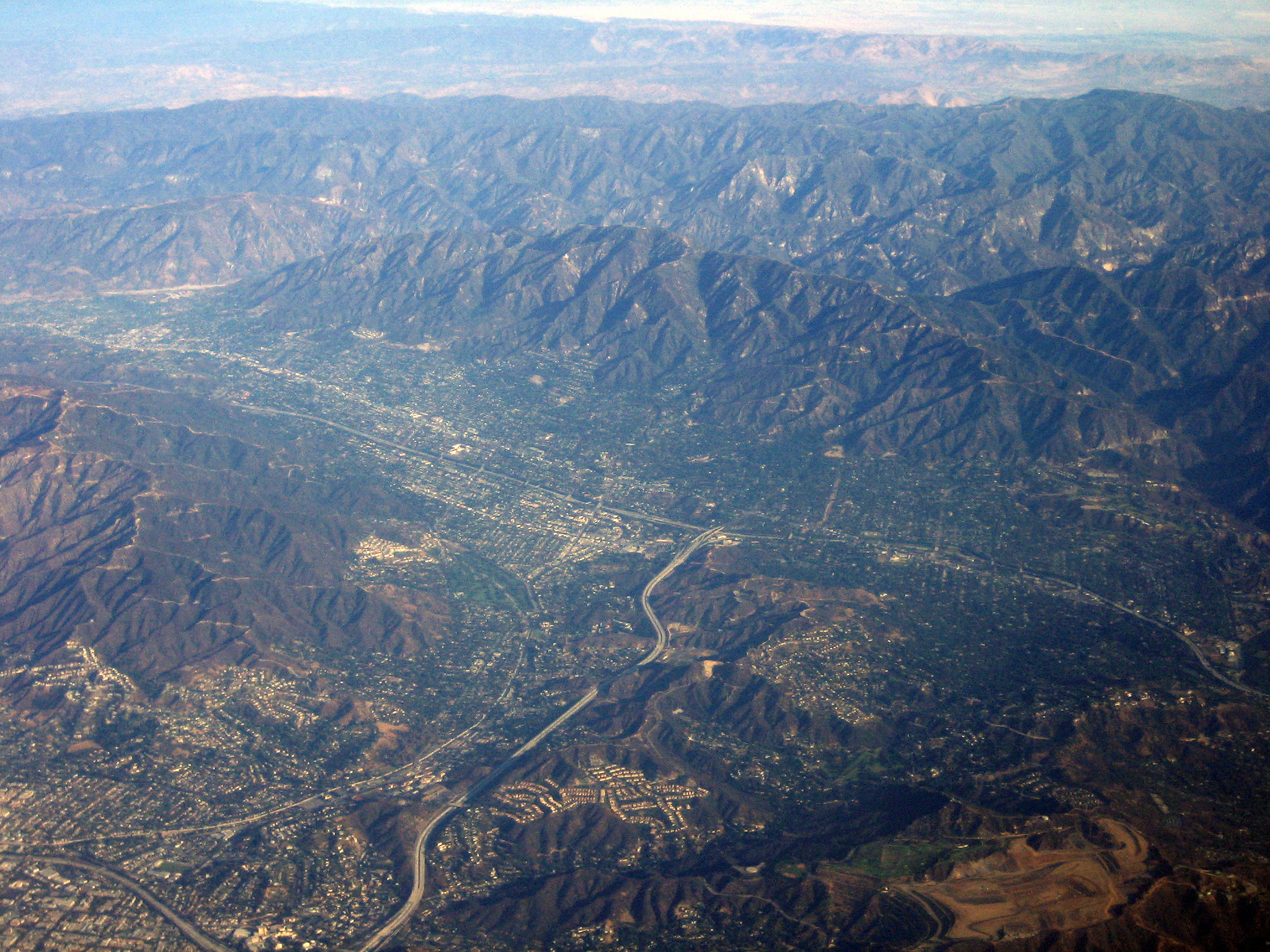
- The Crescenta Valley with the Verdugo Mountains to the left, San Gabriel Mountains to the top, and the Mojave Desert to the very top and top right.

- Location within the Los Angeles metropolitan area Location within California Location within the United States
- Floor elevation: 1,500 ft (460 m)

Geography
- Location: California, United States
- Population centers: Districts of Los Angeles, districts of Glendale, La Cañada Flintridge
- Borders on: San Gabriel Mountains (northeast), Verdugo Mountains and San Rafael Hills (southwest), San Fernando Valley (northwest), San Gabriel Valley (southeast)
- Coordinates: 34°13′30″N 118°14′13″W
- Interactive map of Crescenta Valley

The Crescenta Valley is a small inland valley in Los Angeles County, California, lying between the San Gabriel Mountains on the northeast and the Verdugo Mountains and San Rafael Hills on the southwest. It opens into the San Fernando Valley at the northwest and the San Gabriel Valley at the southeast. It is nearly bisected by the Verdugo Wash, a smaller valley separating the Verdugo Mountains from the San Rafael Hills. Most of the valley lies at an elevation of over 1,500 feet (460 m).

== Etymology ==
The name "Crescenta" does not derive from the Spanish word for "crescent", which is el creciente. Benjamin Briggs coined the name from the English word "crescent" because he could see three crescent-shaped formations from his home, or because of the shape of the valley. The post office was established in 1888, with the Post Office adding the "ta" to the name to distinguish it from Crescent City, California.

== History ==
The Crescenta Valley area has been inhabited by the Tongva for thousands of years, including the central villages of Tuyunga, Hahamongna, and Wikangna. Wikangna was most central to the valley, being located in the Las Barras Canyon area possibly at the Verdugo Hills Golf Course. Villagers thrived on the sprawling oak forests of the area and natural springs.

The Crescenta Valley was a pastoral area under the Rancho Tujunga, Rancho San Rafael and Rancho La Cañada land grants during the Spanish and Mexican periods.

The first American settler in the valley was Theodore Pickens, who settled at the top of today's Briggs Avenue in 1871. The western portion of Rancho La Cañada, which included the major portion of the valley, was subdivided in 1881 into 10-acre parcels by Benjamin B. Briggs. Significant suburban residential development began with the opening of the Montrose subdivision in 1913, accelerating significantly after World War II. Today, the Crescenta Valley is a mature suburban area.

== Communities ==
Incorporated cities, districts of Los Angeles, districts of Glendale, and unincorporated census-designated places in the Crescenta Valley include:

- City of La Cañada Flintridge
- Crescenta Highlands: City of Glendale
- La Crescenta-Montrose: unincorporated Los Angeles County
- Montrose: City of Glendale
- Sunland: City of Los Angeles
- Tujunga: City of Los Angeles
- Verdugo City: City of Glendale

== Weather ==
Daytime temperatures are generally 10 to 15 °F (5.5 to 8.3°C) warmer than those in coastal regions during summer. Winter is somewhat colder than most L.A. area stations. Winter snow is rare, but not unknown on the valley floor. Because of proximity to the mountains, rainfall is generally higher than most Los Angeles area locations, averaging around 20 inches per year, mostly falling between November and March.
