= Cahuenga, California =

Human settlement in California, United States

Coordinates: 34°09′36″N 118°19′34″W

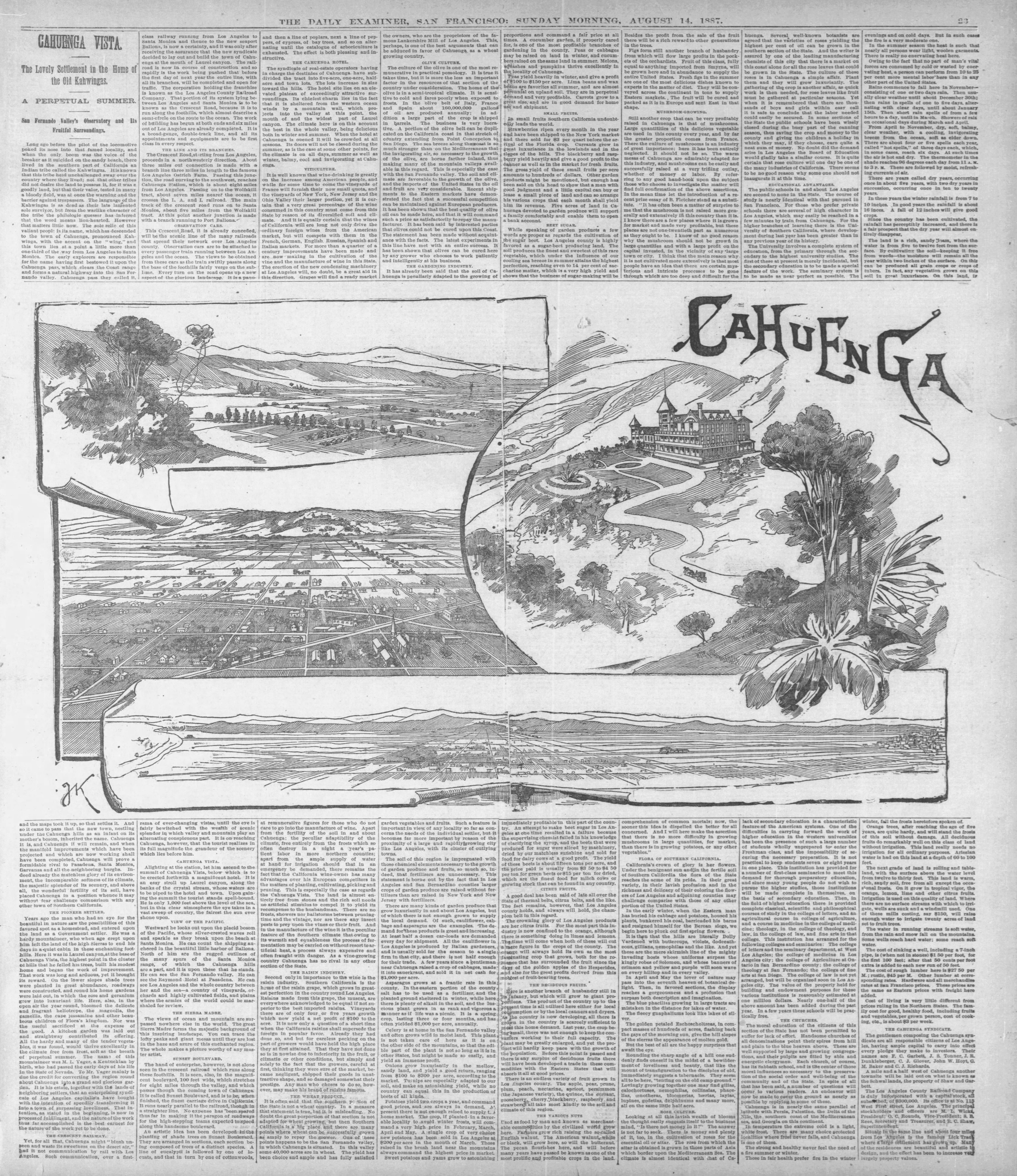
During the 1887 land boom, real estate developers pitched "Cahuenga" as a potential town site

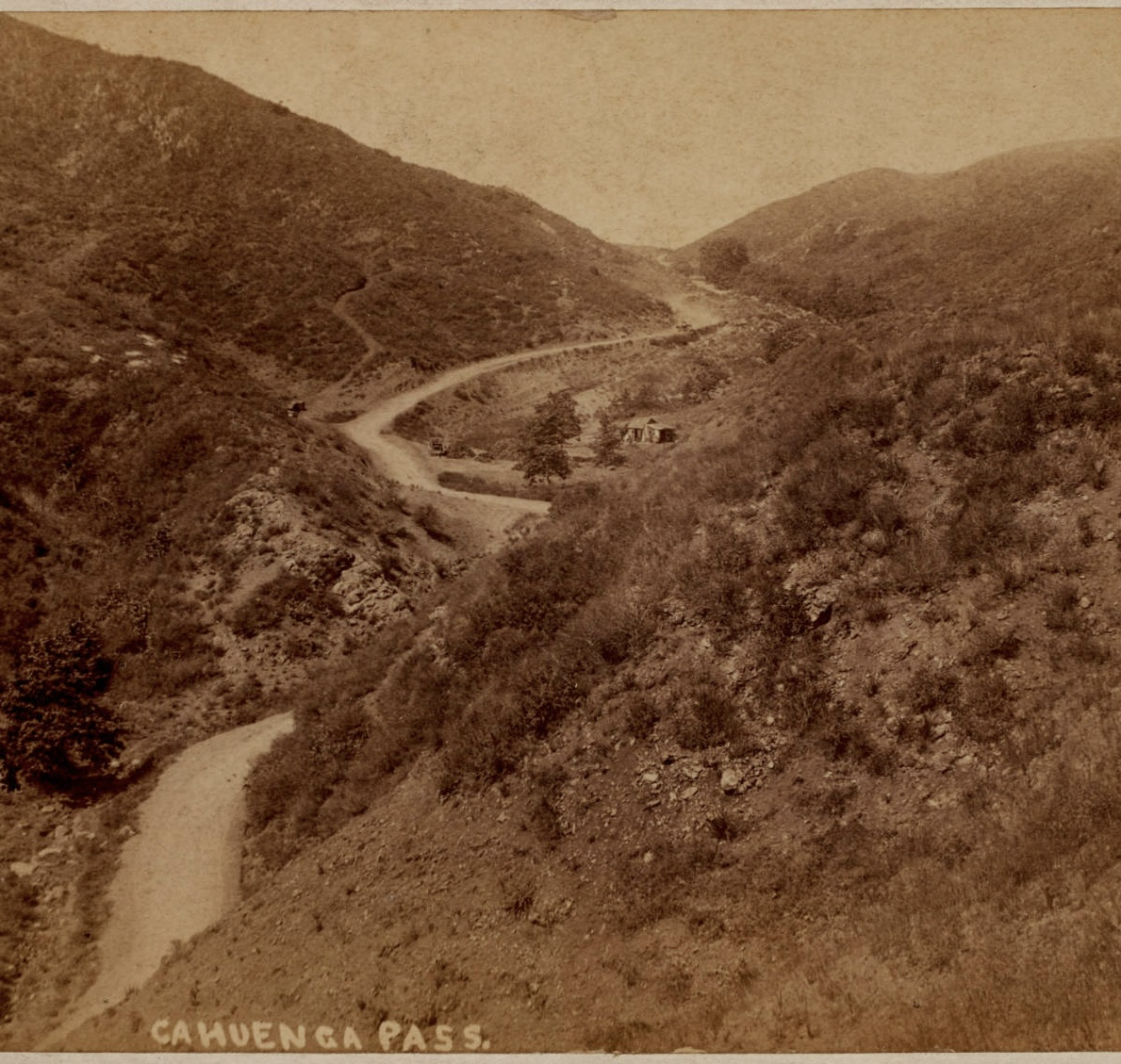
Trail through the Cahuenga Pass c. 1888

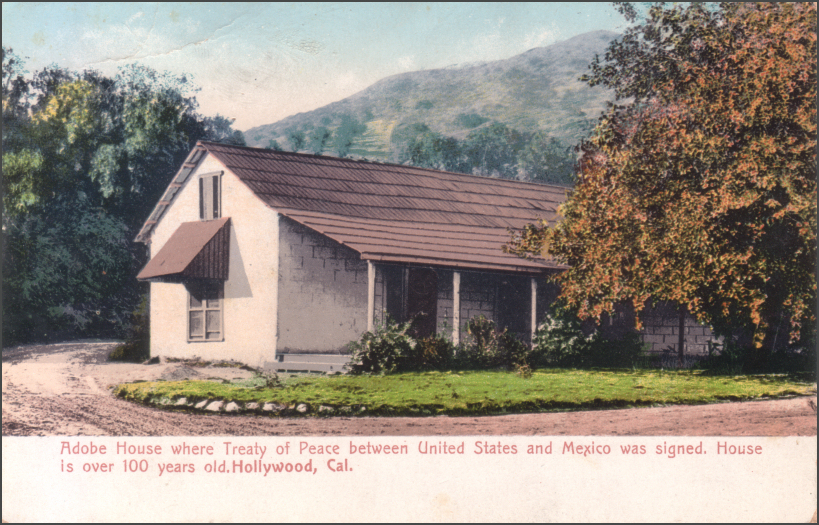
The precise location of Kaweenga village is unknown. In 1842, the adobe farmhouse at Campo de Cahuenga was already described as "old" and it may date to the Spanish colonial era when pastureland in the area was granted to Verdugo. This picture postcard probably dates to roughly the 1910s.

Cahuenga (/kəˈweɪŋɡə/ (also Kawé’nga, Cabeugna, Kowanga, Kawengha, Kawee’nga, or Cabuenga) or "place of the hill" is a former Tongva–Tataviam (Fernandeño–Gabrieleño) Native American settlement in the San Fernando Valley of Los Angeles, Los Angeles County, California. One source suggests kawe means mountain in Tongva language. Recent linguistic work suggests an alternative meaning of "place of the fox". The Tongva-language suffix -nga indicates place, and the suffix -bet or -bit indicates person from place; people from Cahuenga were recorded in mission registers as Capuebet.

The precise location of the village is unknown but it was near the Mission San Fernando Rey de España, possibly near present-day Universal City. In a 2019 map, the village was placed near the Valley Village neighborhood in Los Angeles. Archeologists commissioned by the Los Angeles County Metropolitan Transportation Authority (Metro) to investigate the Campo de Cahuenga historic site state "this vicinity was important as the place traditionally identified as the ethnographic village of Kaweenga (various spellings)."

The earliest record of a person from Cahuenga in the mission baptismal registers is from 1798. People associated with Cahuenga or similar village names are "listed 20 times between 1778–1815, in the San Gabriel Mission baptismal register and 62 times (1800–1806) in the San Fernando Mission register." Three people from Capubet/Cahuenga were baptized in the Pueblo of Los Angeles. The nearest other village was Siutcanga at the Encino Springs. Baptismal registers indicate a significant number of kinship ties between Siutcanga and Cahuenga, as well as fewer kinship ties between Cahuenga and Tuyunga, Hahamongna, Jautbit, Maobit, Acosiubit, Mauga, and others.

The name Cahuenga was later applied to the historic Mexican land grant Rancho Cahuenga, the Battle of Cahuenga Pass (1831), the Second Battle of Cahuenga Pass (1845), and Campo de Cahuenga, in Studio City, California, where the Treaty of Cahuenga was signed. The name survives today in Cahuenga Peak, Cahuenga Pass (between the Valley and Hollywood), Cahuenga Boulevard, and the Cahuenga Branch of the Los Angeles Public Library.

== See also ==
- California mission clash of cultures and Spanish missions in California
- Ranchos of Los Angeles County
- Category: Tongva populated places
