= Hahamog'na =

Tribe of the Tongva people

The Hahamog'na, commonly anglicized to Hahamongna (/hɑːˈhɑːməŋɡə/) and spelled Xaxaamonga in their native language, are a tribe of the Tongva people of California. Their language belongs to the Uto-Aztecan family.

== History ==
The Hahamogna inhabited the Verdugo Mountains foothills and San Rafael Hills; the Arroyo Seco in the westernmost San Gabriel Valley area around present day Pasadena and Altadena; and the easternmost San Fernando Valley area north of the Los Angeles River around present day Glendale; all in Los Angeles County, California.

Two settlements named Hahamongna, California have been located. The Hahamogna band have also been called Pascual and Pascualite Indians, after which the 1843 Mexican land grant Rancho San Pascual, that included their part of the Arroyo Seco, was named.

Hahamog'na was met by Gaspar de Portolà of the overland Mexican Expedition in 1770. The Spanish began a proselytizing campaign of religious conversion and servitude, the Indian Reductions.

The name Hahamongna is now applied to Hahamongna Watershed Park, an archeological site of one of the Hahamongna, California settlements, a recreational area, and an open space nature preserve-park in the upper Arroyo Seco in Pasadena.

== Other Tongva tribes ==
Other family groups of the Tongva could be found elsewhere in the San Gabriel Valley and San Fernando Valley. With the founding of Mission San Gabriel Arcángel in 1771 and Mission San Fernando Rey de España in 1797, these Tongva groups gathered at the missions and were taught European skills of farming, raising cattle and producing leather, tallow, and soap. Once converted to Christianity, the neophytes were generally not permitted to return to village life. Collectively these groups were referred to as Gabrieleños and Fernandeños by the Spanish.

Other Tongva names that are recognizable about the Southland: Cahueg-na (Cahuenga), Topag-na (Topanga), and Azuksag-na (Azusa).

- Tongva populated places

== See also ==
- Tongva
  - Tongva language
  - Hahamongna, California
- Arroyo Seco (Los Angeles County)
- California mission clash of cultures
  - Spanish missions in California
  - Ranchos of California
  - List of Ranchos of California
