= Wikangna =

Former Tongva village in California

Wikangna (pronounced wi-kong-na) was a Tongva village located in the Crescenta Valley area, possibly in Las Barras Canyon at the site of the Verdugo Hills Golf Course. Wikangna was one of three central villages located in the Crescenta Valley area, including Tuyunga and the largest settlement of Hahamongna.

== History ==
Wikangna prospered for thousands of years, thriving off the abundance of the local flora and fauna of the area, including large sprawling oak forest (of which a small part remains) and a small spring.

The arrival of Spanish colonizers in 1771 led to the decline of the village. This similarly occurred with nearby villages in the area. Wikangna was likely abandoned completely during the mission period.

After the missions were secularized by the First Mexican Republic in 1833, some villagers who survived the high death rate of the missions, returned to Wikangna shortly. This was noted by Phil Begue, whose family purchased the land in 1882, recalling that there were a band of "Indians" camped in the area before his family took possession of the land. It is likely they were chased off the land shortly after.
