= Verdugo Wash =

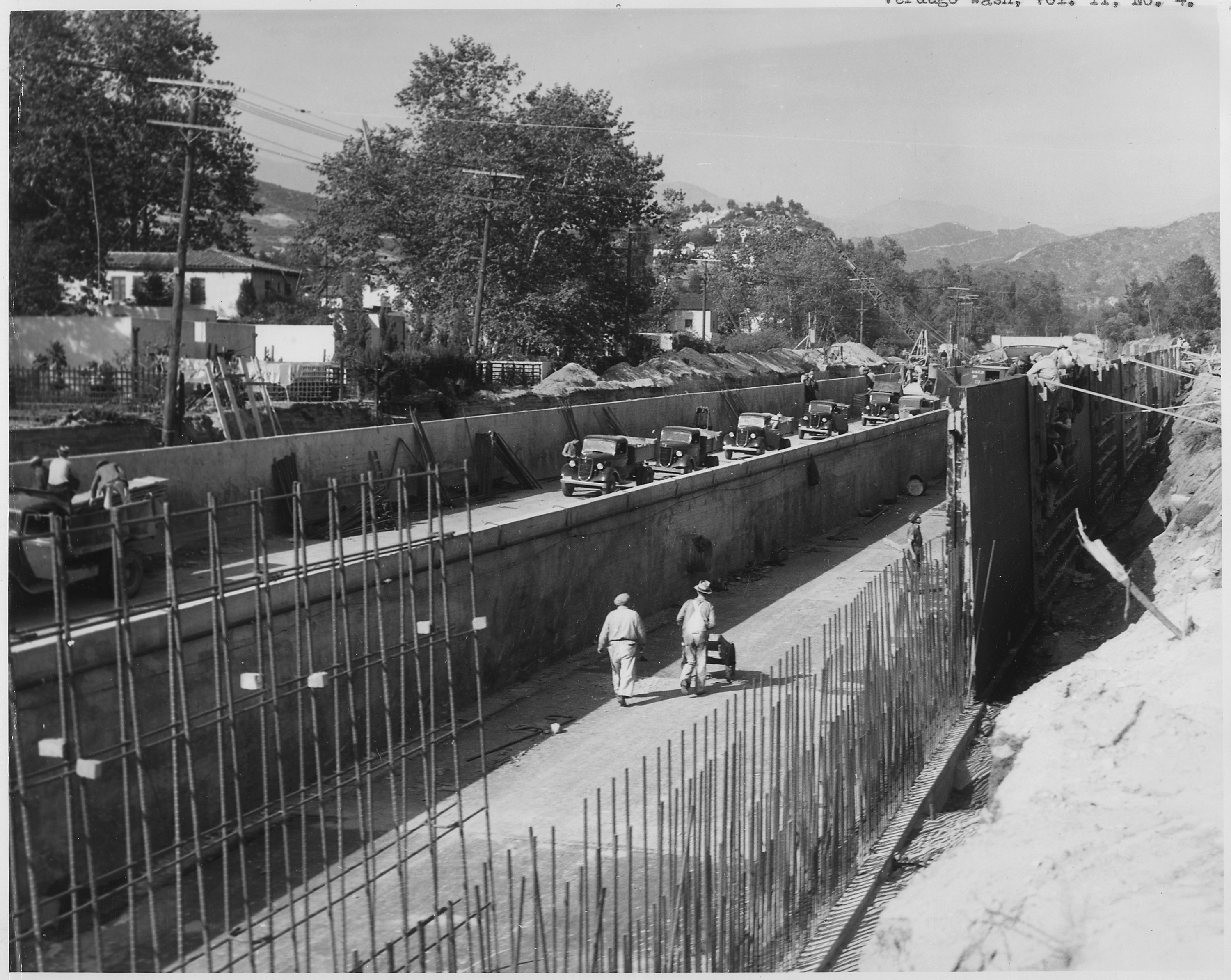
- Channelization work, 1936

Location
- Country: United States

Physical characteristics
- Source
  - location: Glendale, California
  - coordinates: 34.203°N 118.2375°W
- Mouth
  - location: Los Angeles River, California

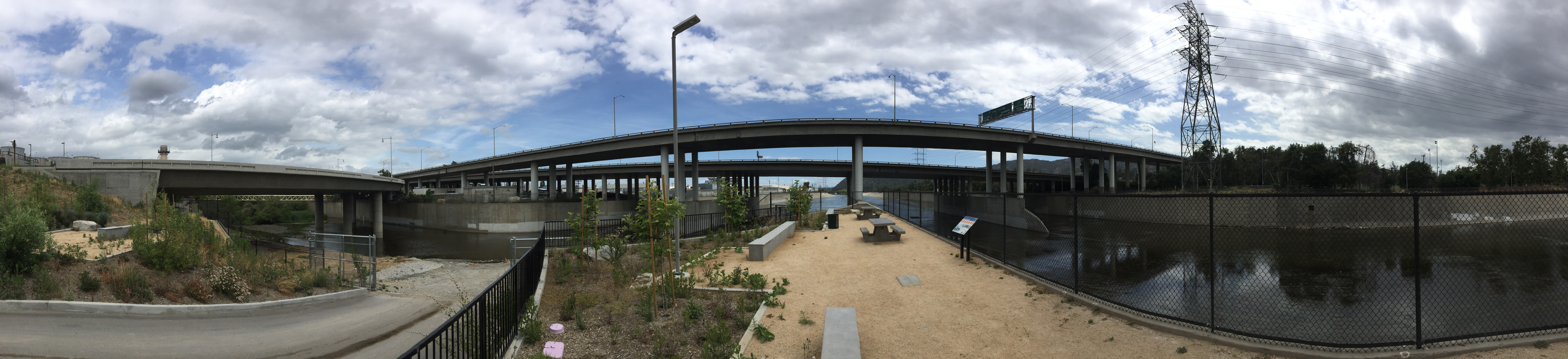
Confluence of Verdugo Wash (left) with the Los Angeles River at the Ventura Freeway bridge

Verdugo Wash is a 9.4-mile-long (15.1 km) tributary of the Los Angeles River, in the Glendale area of Los Angeles County, California.

The stream begins just south of Interstate 210 in the Crescenta Valley. It flows southeast along the eastern edge of the Verdugo Mountains, then south through a pass between those mountains and the San Rafael Hills, and finally west to ultimately join the Los Angeles River just northeast of Griffith Park. Its entire path is located within the city of Glendale. With the exception of the free-flowing stream inside the Verdugo Wash Debris Basin Dam, Verdugo Wash is entirely encased in a concrete flood control channel.

Verdugo Wash Visioning Project will create a 9.4-mile long (15.1 km) linear park and nature trail for walking and cycling with access to neighborhoods that make up a large core of Glendale including its businesses, entertainment venues, city centers and services. Glendale's Verdugo Wash Visioning Project received $6 million in funding from Assembly member Laura Friedman in AB 179, the State Budget Act of 2022.

== Crossings ==
From mouth to source (year built in parentheses):

- Railroad: Union Pacific Coast Line
- San Fernando Road (1939)
- Concord Street (1940)
- North Kenilworth Avenue (1936)
- North Pacific Avenue (1981)
- North Central Avenue (1981)
- Hilton Los Angeles North/Glendale
- North Brand Boulevard (1986)
- Road to Nestle Building
- North Louise Street (1990)
- North Jackson Street (1969)
- Geneva Street (1938)
- East Glenoaks Boulevard (1938)
- East Mountain Street (1936)
- Canada Boulevard (1933)
- Verdugo Woodlands Elementary School [Pedestrian Bridge]
- Wabasso Way (1938)
- Opechee Way (1940)
- Glorietta Avenue (1941)
- Glorietta Park [Pedestrian Bridge]
- Canada Boulevard (1933)
- Oakmont Country Club [6 Pedestrian Bridges]
- Verdugo Wash Debris Basin Dam
- Oakmont View Drive (1979)
- Shirlyjean Street (1953)
- Whiting Woods Road (1967)
- New York Avenue/Kadletz Road (1967)
- Crescenta Valley Park [Pedestrian Bridge]
- Boston Avenue (1957)
