= La Tuna Fire =

2017 wildfire in Southern California

- Part of the 2017 California wildfires
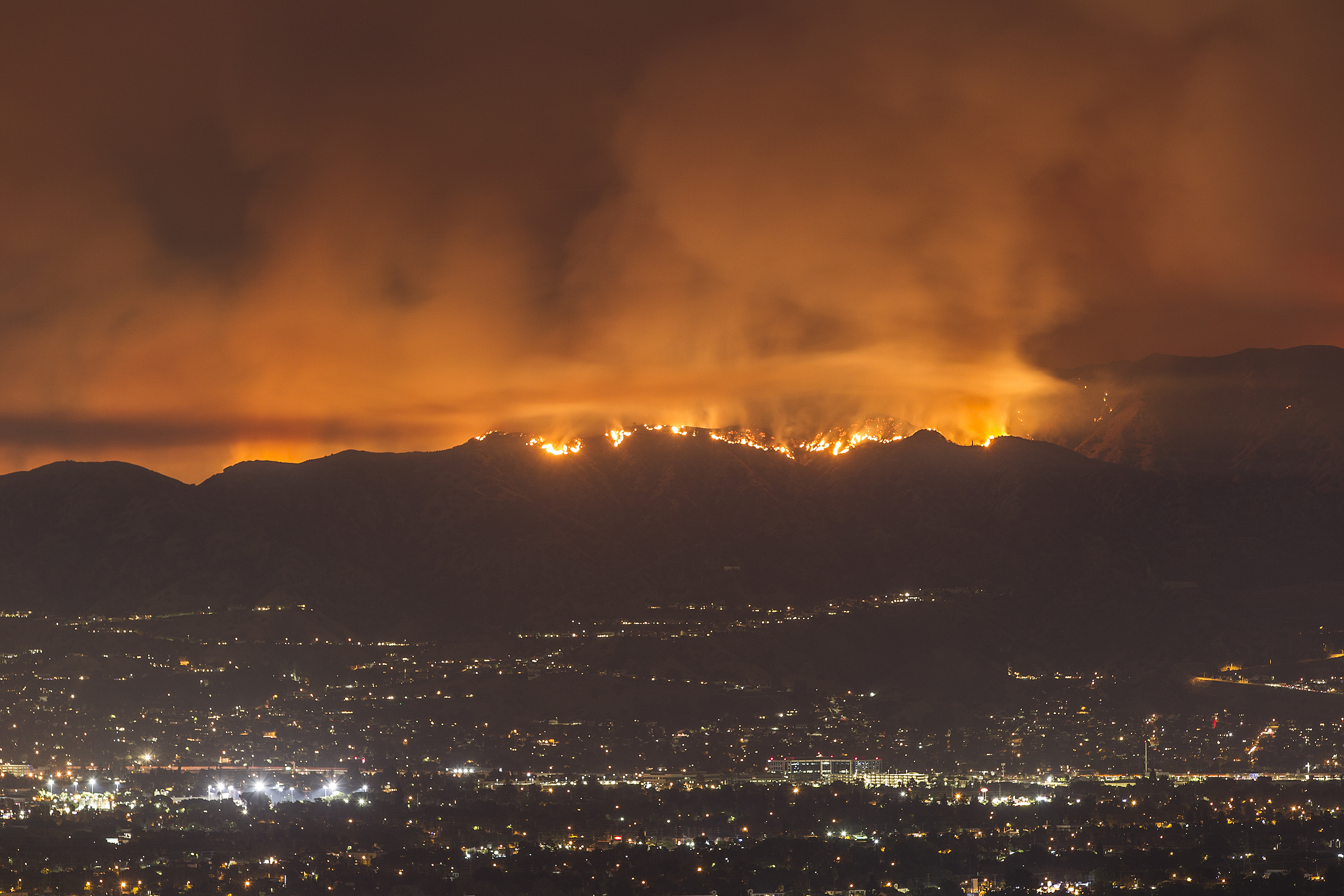
- The fire burning in the Verdugo Mountains above Burbank on September 1
- Date: September 1 –; September 9, 2017; (9 days)
- Location: Los Angeles County, Southern California, United States
- Coordinates: 34.229°N 118.267°W

Statistics
- Burned area: 7,194 acres (29 km^{2})

Impacts
- Injuries: 10
- Evacuated: ≥730 homes
- Structures destroyed: 5 single residences; 5 outbuildings

Ignition
- Cause: Undetermined

Map
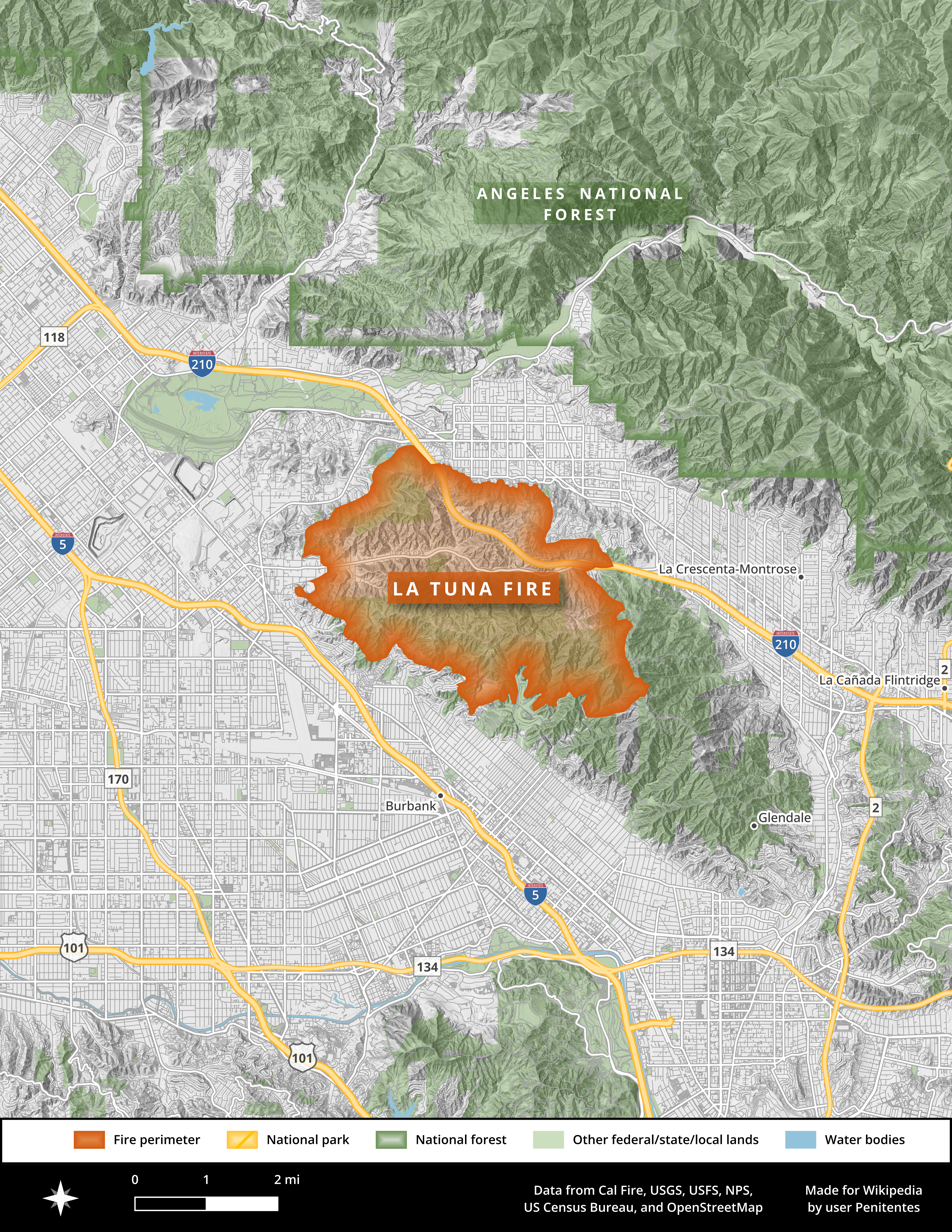
- The footprint of the La Tuna Fire

- The general location of the fire, in Los Angeles County

The La Tuna Fire was a wildfire in the Verdugo Mountains in Los Angeles County, Southern California, in September 2017. The fire began from undetermined causes on the afternoon of September 1 in La Tuna Canyon, and burned 7,194 acres (2,911 ha) before its containment on September 9. The fire caused at least ten injuries, the destruction of five homes and five outbuildings, and the evacuations of hundreds more. It was one of the largest wildfires in the history of the city of Los Angeles.

== Progression ==
The La Tuna Fire was first reported shortly before 1:30 p.m. PDT on Friday, September 1. It was named for its location in La Tuna Canyon, At that point it was one acre (0.4 ha) in size, located in a drainage area near the 10800 block of La Tuna Canyon Road, south of Interstate 210. The fire initially grew to the northeast, and fire crews made good progress on containing it until high winds cast embers over the freeway, sparking a spot fire on the north side of the interstate.

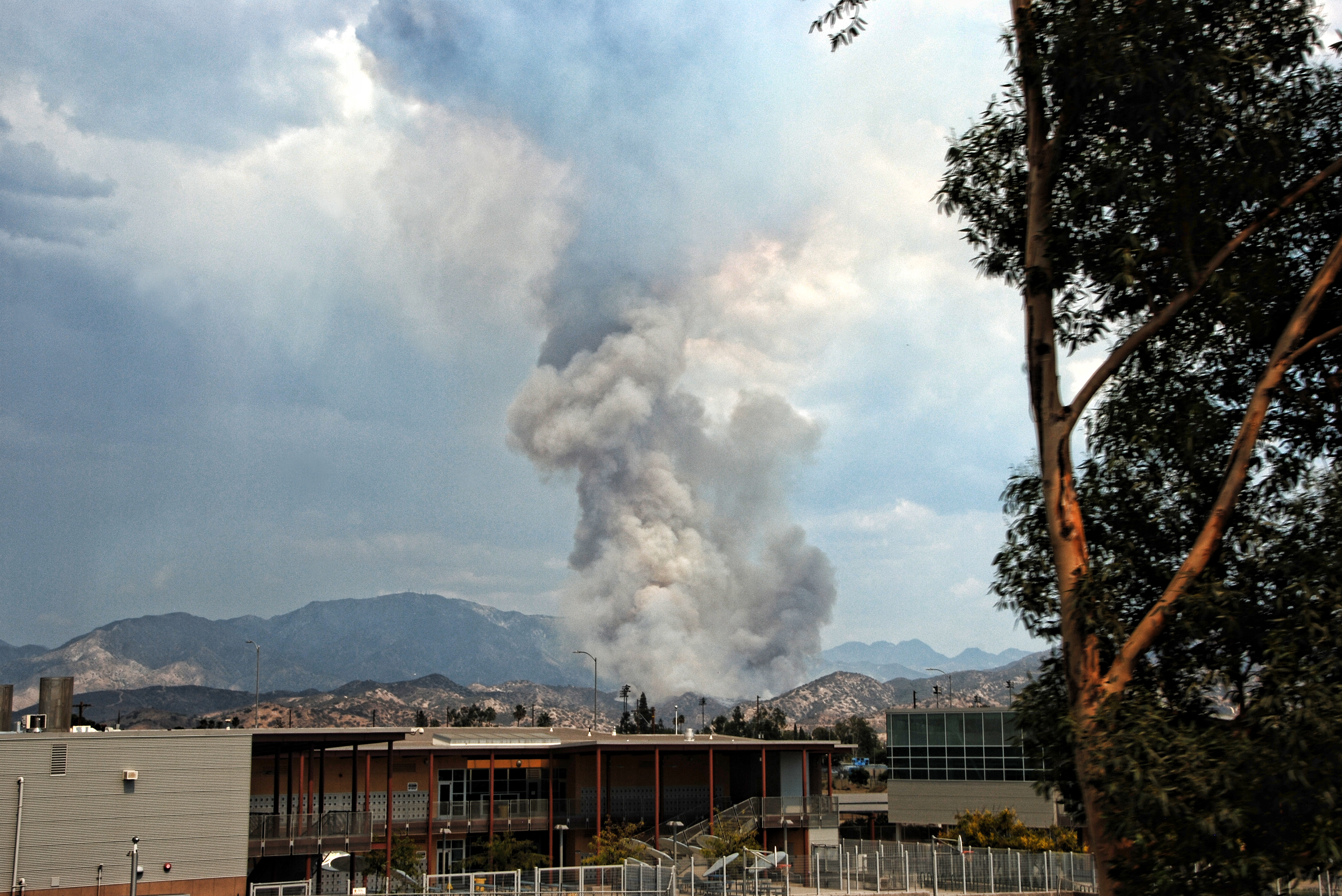
The fire approximately an hour and a half after igniting, seen from Sun Valley

The California Highway Patrol shut down Interstate 210 between Lowell Avenue to the east and Sunland Boulevard to the west. By 4:00 p.m., the fire was established on both sides of the freeway and moving south toward Burbank. Shortly after 5:00 p.m., the fire had burned 500 acres (200 ha), and by 9:30 p.m., 1,500 acres (610 ha). Firefighters were challenged by temperatures up to 106 °F (41 °C) and relative humidity levels down to 16 percent.

By late on Friday, there remained "a very large amount of active fire" on either side of Interstate 210, the fire had entered Burbank city limits, and the fire's perimeter was only ten percent contained. Multiple mandatory evacuation orders were in place, including for the DeBell Golf Course and residences in the Brace Canyon Park area in Burbank. Voluntary evacuations covered other areas, such as Haynes Canyon Park and Reverie Road. Approximately 50 homes were directly threatened and 200 were subject to evacuation orders. Strong winds continued to drive the fire, which by midnight was burning in four different directions.

=== September 2 onward ===
Changeable winds and high temperatures—101 °F (38 °C) in Burbank and 96 °F (36 °C) in Tujunga—continued to test firefighting personnel on Saturday, September 2. More than 800 firefighters were assigned to the fire, which was active in multiple areas to the southwest of Interstate 210 (which remained closed). New mandatory evacuations were issued in Glendale, Burbank, and the Sunland-Tujunga community in Los Angeles. At this point, evacuations covered at least 730 homes: 300 in Burbank, 250 in Glendale, and 180 in Los Angeles. Los Angeles Mayor Eric Garcetti declared a local emergency on Saturday night, by which time the La Tuna Fire had burned 5,800 acres (2,300 ha) and its perimeter remained ten percent contained.

On Sunday, September 3, moisture from Tropical Storm Lidia moved into the fire area, bringing some rain and reduced temperatures. All evacuation warnings and orders were lifted by the Los Angeles Fire Department. California governor Jerry Brown declared a state of emergency in Los Angeles County at the request of Mayor Garcetti. By this point, 1,061 firefighters were fighting the fire with 206 engines, 9 helicopters, 5 water tenders, and 4 dozers. One hundred firefighters sent to assist with Hurricane Harvey relief efforts in Houston were recalled to Los Angeles.

On Monday, September 4, all lanes of Interstate 210 reopened. By 8:00 p.m. on September 5, the fire had burned 7,194 acres (2,911 ha) and its perimeter was 80 percent contained.

On September 9, 2017, the LA Fire Department declared that the La Tuna Fire was 100 percent contained.

On October 26, 2017, the Los Angeles Fire Department's investigation into the origins of the La Tuna Fire ended with no cause determined. The report indicated that it was "not suspicious in nature." There was no evidence of arson.

== Effects ==
The La Tuna Fire was one of the largest in the history of the city of Los Angeles. Mayor Garcetti called the La Tuna Fire the largest wildfire in Los Angeles city history, though CNN reported that it remained smaller than the Sayre Fire, which burned in 2008 in the Sylmar area.

In response to the fire, the Los Angeles City Council began processes of creating best practices for residents to be prepared and to deal with large-scale emergencies. The fire also inspired the creation of the volunteer-based La Tuna Canyon Fire & Rescue department, formed to enhance local readiness and community resilience in the wake of the disaster.

At least ten injuries occurred. These included six firefighters (four suffered heat-related illnesses, one had an allergic reaction to a bee sting, and one sustained minor burns) and two civilians (one with a heat-related illness and one an eye injury).

The number of people affected by evacuation orders at the peak of the fire exceeded 700.

Five homes and five outbuildings were destroyed. At least two of the homes and one of the outbuildings were in isolated structures surrounded by brush, in the foothills near Tujunga.

At times, the fire contributed to poor air quality in the region as smoke became trapped beneath an atmospheric inversion. On Saturday, September 2, the South Coast Air Quality Management District issued a smoke advisory for Burbank and the eastern portion of the San Fernando Valley, and advised affected populations to stay indoors.

== See also ==
- 2017 California wildfires
- December 2017 Southern California wildfires
- 2018 Southern California mudflows
