= Hahamongna, California =

Two historic Tongva village sites in California, U.S.

Coordinates: 34.1922°N 118.1744°W

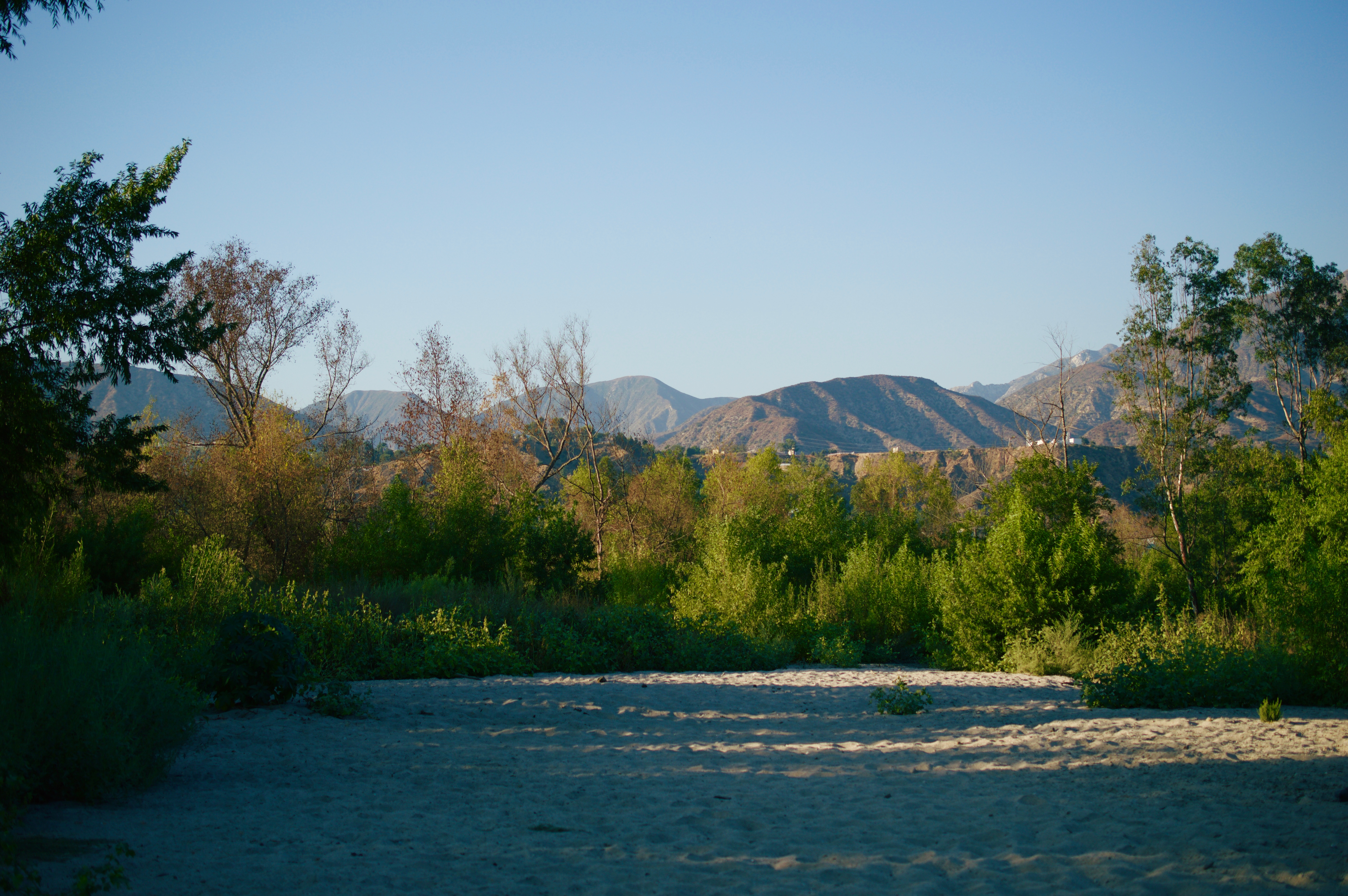
Hahamongna Watershed Park

Hahamongna (alternatively spelled Hahaamonga or Jajamonga) and Hahamog-na are two historic Tongva village sites. They are located in the Verdugo Mountains of Southern California and bear the name of the local band of indigenous Tongva, "Hahamog'na." The sites are located in present-day Pasadena and Glendale in Los Angeles County, California. Hahamongna was one of the largest Tongva villages in the greater San Fernando Valley area, along with Cahuenga, Tujunga, and Siutcanga.

== Locations ==
=== Hahamongna – Glendale ===
Hahamongna was located in present-day Glendale and existed on the lower southwestern Verdugo Mountains slopes and the eastern San Fernando Valley plain with the free-flowing Los Angeles River just south. This village would later move to the western portion of Rancho San Rafael, an early Spanish land grant in 1784 issued by Las Californias Governor Pedro Fages to Spanish Corporal José María Verdugo (1751–1831), in present-day Glendale in the San Fernando Valley.

=== Hahamog-na – Arroyo Seco ===
Hahamog-na is the Tongva village archeological site located in the upper Arroyo Seco area just above the Devil's Gate in the present-day Altadena-Pasadena-Jet Propulsion Laboratory-JPL area. It is where the lower slopes of the eastern Verdugo Mountains, southern San Gabriel Mountains, and western San Rafael Hills meet in the Arroyo Seco canyon valley. The site of Hahamog-na is now within the protected natural area of Hahamongna Watershed Park, a 300-acre (1.2 km^{2}) habitat and plant community blend of freshwater marsh wetlands, riparian zones, native oak woodlands, and chaparral elfin forests.

== Hahamog-na Tongva band ==
The band of Tongva people who lived in the area of the Verdugo Mountains that contains both settlements was named the Hahamog-na and Hahamongna by some non-native immigrants and historians. The two settlements sharing the 'same sounding' name, with different spellings given by non-native people, may stem from the band inhabiting both places. Research with present-day Tongva-Gabrieleño people, historical researchers and ethnologists, and supported by citations is needed.

== See also ==
- Category: Tongva populated places – all Tongva settlement articles
- Tongva language
- Category: Tongva – all Tongva articles
- Indigenous peoples of California
- Population of Native California
- Rancho La Cañada – adjacent on northeast
- List of Ranchos of California
