= Rancho Tujunga =

Mexican land grant in California

Coordinates: 34.280°N 118.300°W

- Land grant of Mexico
- 1845–1875
- Area
- Government
  - Type: Land grant
- Grantee
  - 1845-1875: Francisco Lopez and Pedro Lopez
- History
  - Established: 1845
  - Disestablished: 1875
- Today part of: United States

Rancho Tujunga was a 6,661-acre (26.96 km^{2}) Mexican land grant in the western Crescenta Valley and northeastern San Fernando Valley, in present-day Los Angeles County, California. It was granted in 1840 by Mexican governor Juan Alvarado to Francisco Lopez and Pedro Lopez.

The rancho lands included the present-day Los Angeles communities of Lake View Terrace, Sunland, and Tujunga.

== Etymology ==
The name Tujunga or Tuxunga means "old woman's place" in both Fernandeño and Gabrieliño, where Tuxu means "old woman". The term is thought to relate to an ethnohistoric narrative, known as Khra'wiyawi, collected by Carobeth Laird from Juan and Juana Menendez at the Leonis Adobe in 1916. In the narrative, the wife of Khra'wiyawi (the chief of the region) is stricken with grief over the untimely loss of her daughter. In her sadness, she retreats to the mountains and turns to stone. It is thought this event became the basis for the village name. In fact, there is a large rock in Little Tujunga Canyon which looks like an old woman in a sitting position.

== History ==
The Mexican government made the land grant to brothers Francisco and Pedro Lopez in 1840. Francisco Lopez is the individual who discovered gold in Placerita Canyon in 1842.

In 1845 the Lopez brothers traded the 6,661-acre (26.96 km^{2}) Rancho Tujunga for the 388-acre (1.57 km^{2}) Rancho Cahuenga owned by Miguel Triunfo, an Indian who had been employed at San Fernando Mission. In 1850, Triunfo sold a half-interest in Rancho Tujunga back to Francisco Lopez, and then sold the other half-interest to Los Angeles merchants David W. Alexander and Francis Mellus. In 1851, Francisco Lopez sold his half-interest to Agustin Olvera.

With the cession of California to the United States following the Mexican-American War, the 1848 Treaty of Guadalupe Hidalgo provided that the land grants would be honored. As required by the Land Act of 1851, a claim for Rancho Tujunga was filed with the Public Land Commission in 1852, and the grant was patented to Alexander, Mellus and Olvera in 1874.

Alexander and Mellus sold their half-interest to Olvera in 1856. In 1875, Olvera sold the entire Rancho Tujunga to Andrew Glassell. There was further legal dispute about the boundaries in 1888.

== Historic sites of the Rancho ==
- Bolton Hall. Bolton Hall was constructed in 1913 and declared Historic Cultural Monument #2 in 1962 by the City of Los Angeles.
- Adobe house.

== See also ==
- Ranchos of California
- List of Ranchos of California
- Ranchos of Los Angeles County, California
