= Rancho Cahuenga =

Mexican land grant in California

Coordinates: 34.170°N 118.320°W

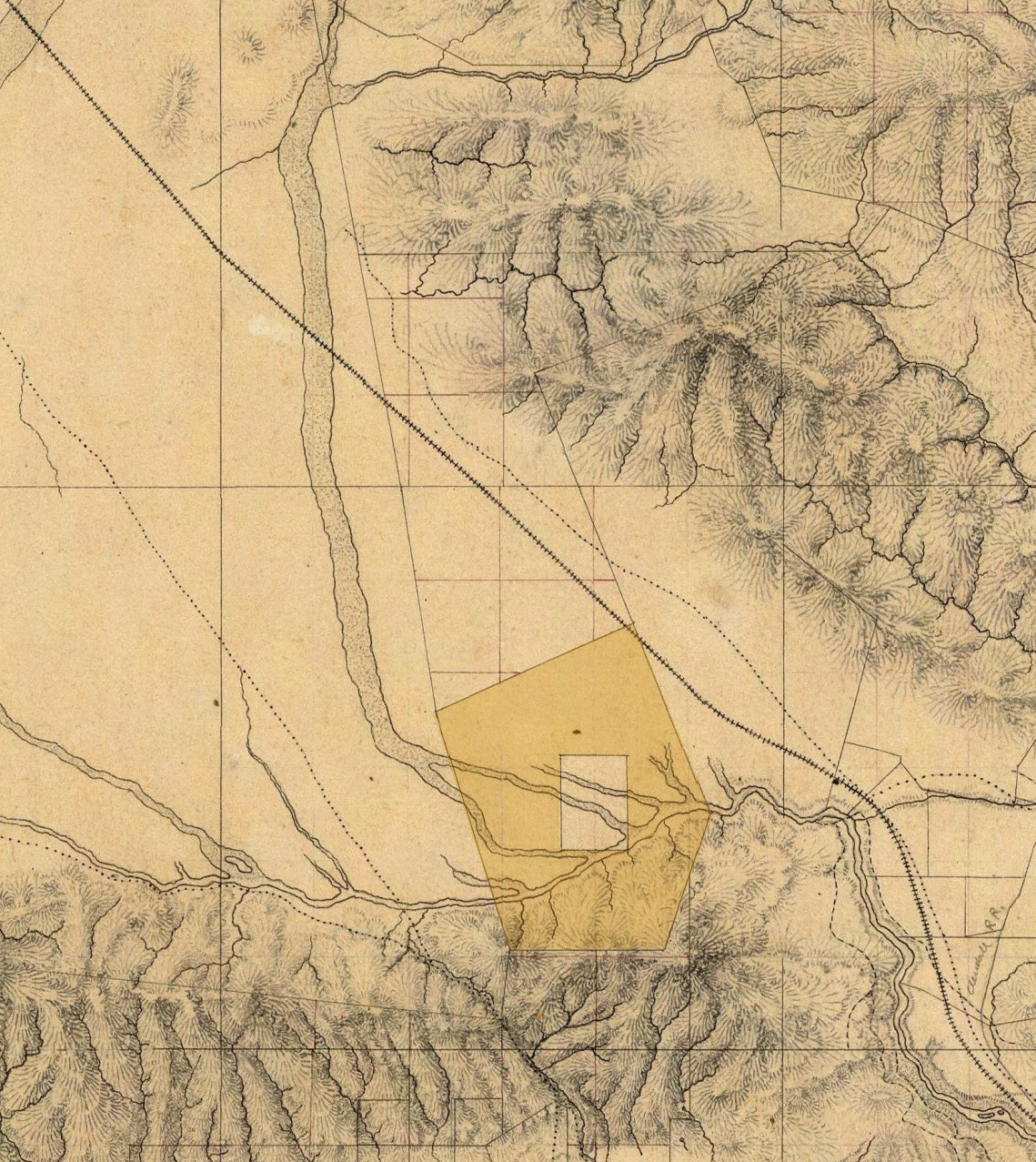
Detail of the southeastern San Fernando Valley, from a manuscript map of Los Angeles and San Bernardino topography, 1880, showing the Rancho Cahuenga inholding within Rancho Providencia (shaded area, added).

Rancho Cahuenga, sometimes called the Cahuenga Tract, was a 388-acre (1.57 km^{2}) Mexican land grant in the San Fernando Valley, in present-day Los Angeles County, California, given in 1843 by governor Manuel Micheltorena to José Miguel Triunfo. Rancho Cahuenga is now a part of the city of Burbank, with the Los Angeles River channel running through it. Rancho Cahuenga is often confused with the nearby Campo de Cahuenga, near what is now Universal City, where in 1847 the Articles of Capitulation were signed, ending the Mexican-American War in Alta California.

== History ==
Jose Miguel Triunfo was an ex-San Fernando Mission Indian born around 1810. He had been granted Rancho Cahuenga by Mexican Governor Micheltorena in 1843 for services performed at the Mission. Jose Miguel Triunfo was one of the few Indians that were able to obtain and keep property. Miguel and his wife, Maria Rafaela (Canedo) Arriola can be found in the 1850 census of Los Angeles.

In 1845, Triunfo traded the 388 acres (1.6 km^{2}) Rancho Cahuenga for the 6,661 acres (27.0 km^{2}) Rancho Tujunga owned brothers Pedro Lopez and Francisco Lopez.

With the cession of California to the United States following the Mexican-American War, the 1848 Treaty of Guadalupe Hidalgo provided that the land grants would be honored. As required by the Land Act of 1851, a claim for Rancho Cahuenga was filed with the Public Land Commission in 1852, and the Rancho Cahuenga grant was patented to David W. Alexander and Francis Mellus in 1872.

A separate claim was filed by Nicolás Morchon in 1853 but was rejected. A (probably fraudulent) claim was filed by Joseph Yves Limantour in 1853 and was also rejected.

Rancho Cahuenga was an inholding within the Rancho Providencia land grant. In 1867, Alexander sold Rancho Cahuenga to David Burbank, who had also acquired Rancho Providencia.

== See also ==
- Cahuenga, California; Tongva settlement.
- Ranchos of California
- List of Ranchos of California
