= Campo de Cahuenga =

Historic house in California, United States

- U.S. National Register of Historic Places
- California Historical Landmark
- Los Angeles Historic-Cultural Monument
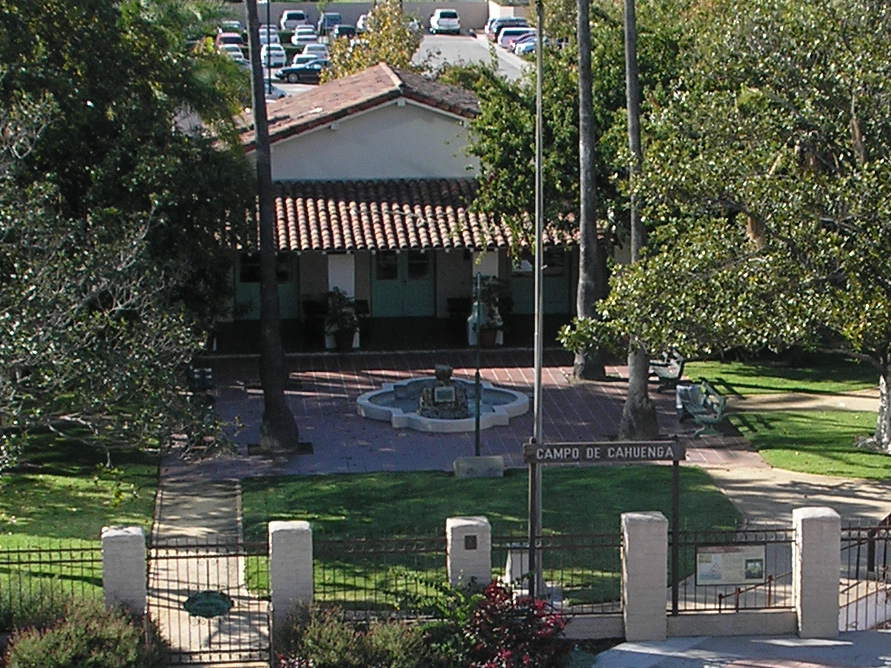
- Campo de Cahuenga

- Location within the Los Angeles metropolitan area Location within California Location within the United States
- Location: 3919 Lankershim Blvd. Studio City, California 91604
- Coordinates: 34°8′24″N 118°21′42″W
- Built: 1847
- Architect: Landon and Spencer
- Architectural style: Mission Revival-Spanish Colonial Revival
- NRHP reference No.: 72001602
- CHISL No.: 151
- LAHCM No.: 29

Significant dates
- Added to NRHP: December 19, 2003
- Designated LAHCM: 13 November 1964

Campo de Cahuenga (/kəˈwɛŋɡə/) is an adobe reproduction and memorial park located at the site of the signing of the 1847 Capitulation of Cahuenga, a ceasefire agreement which ended the Conquest of California. Situated at the north end of Cahuenga Pass, in the San Fernando Valley of Los Angeles, the current structure was built in 1950 and serves as a historic interpretation center dedicated to the Capitulation of Cahuenga, signed between Lieutenant Colonel John C. Frémont, representing the American forces, and Captain Andrés Pico, representing the Californio forces.

== History ==
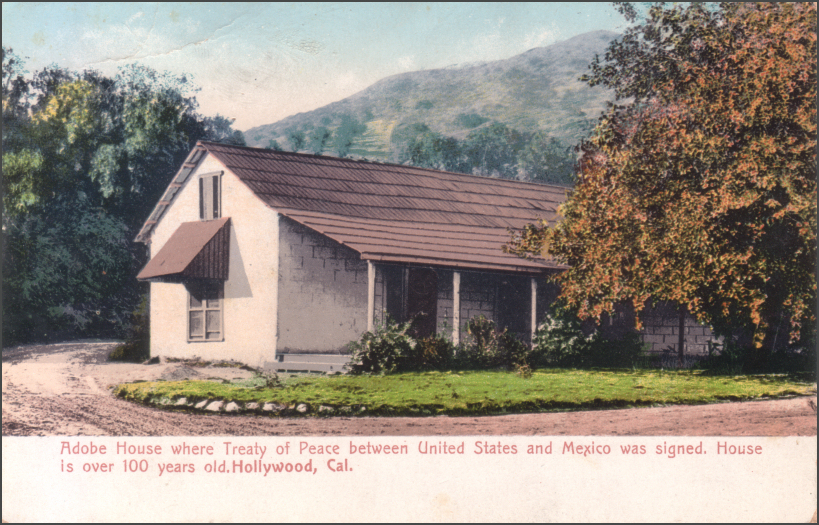
Tinted postcard of the original adobe ranch house, with Cahuenga Peak in the background.

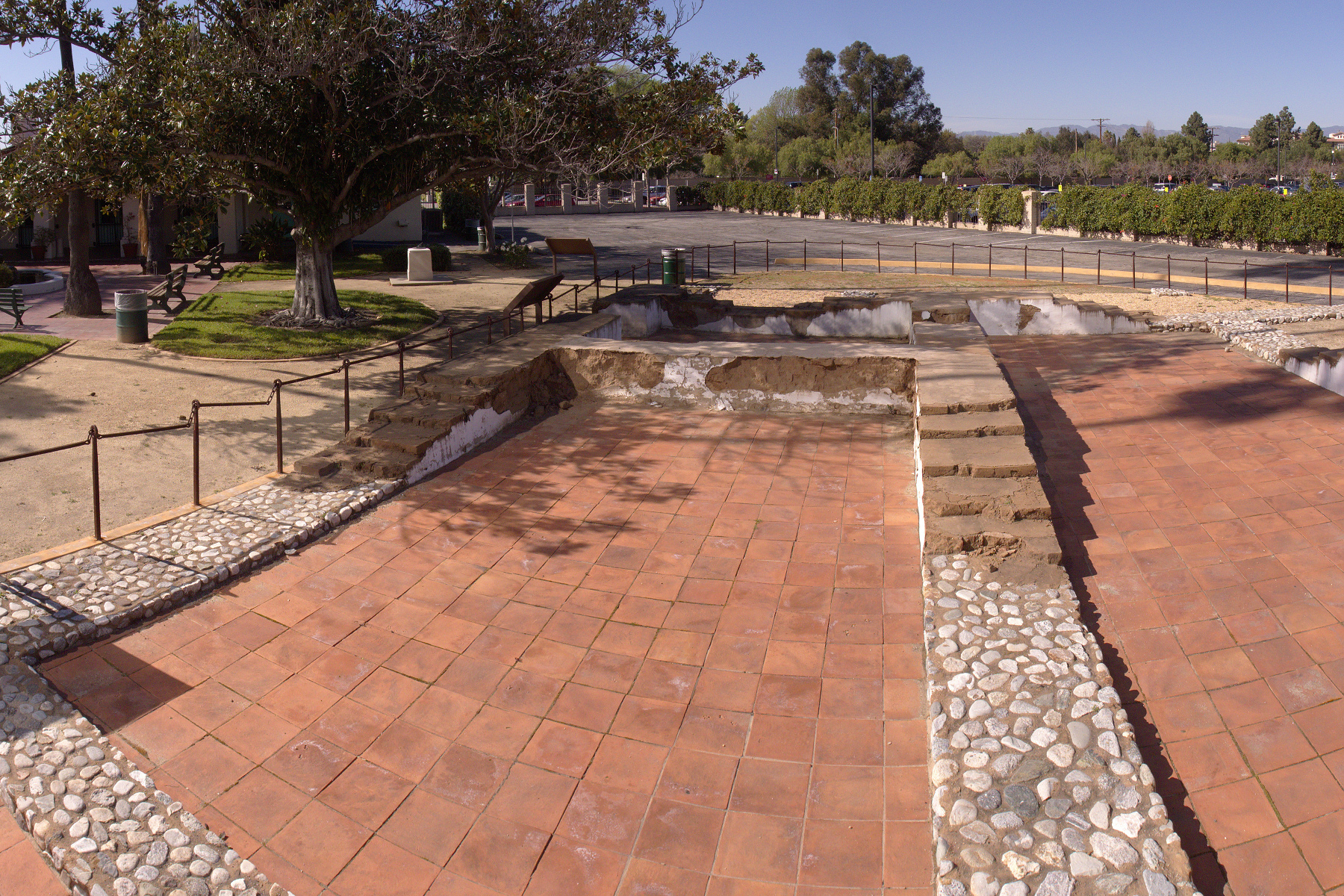
The foundation of the original adobe at Campo de Cahuenga.

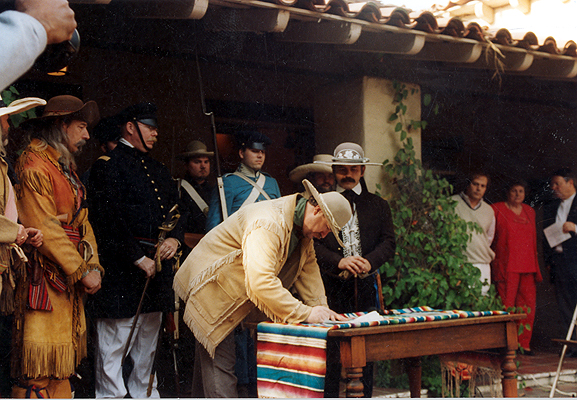
Reenactment of John C. Frémont and Andrés Pico signing the Treaty of Cahuenga.

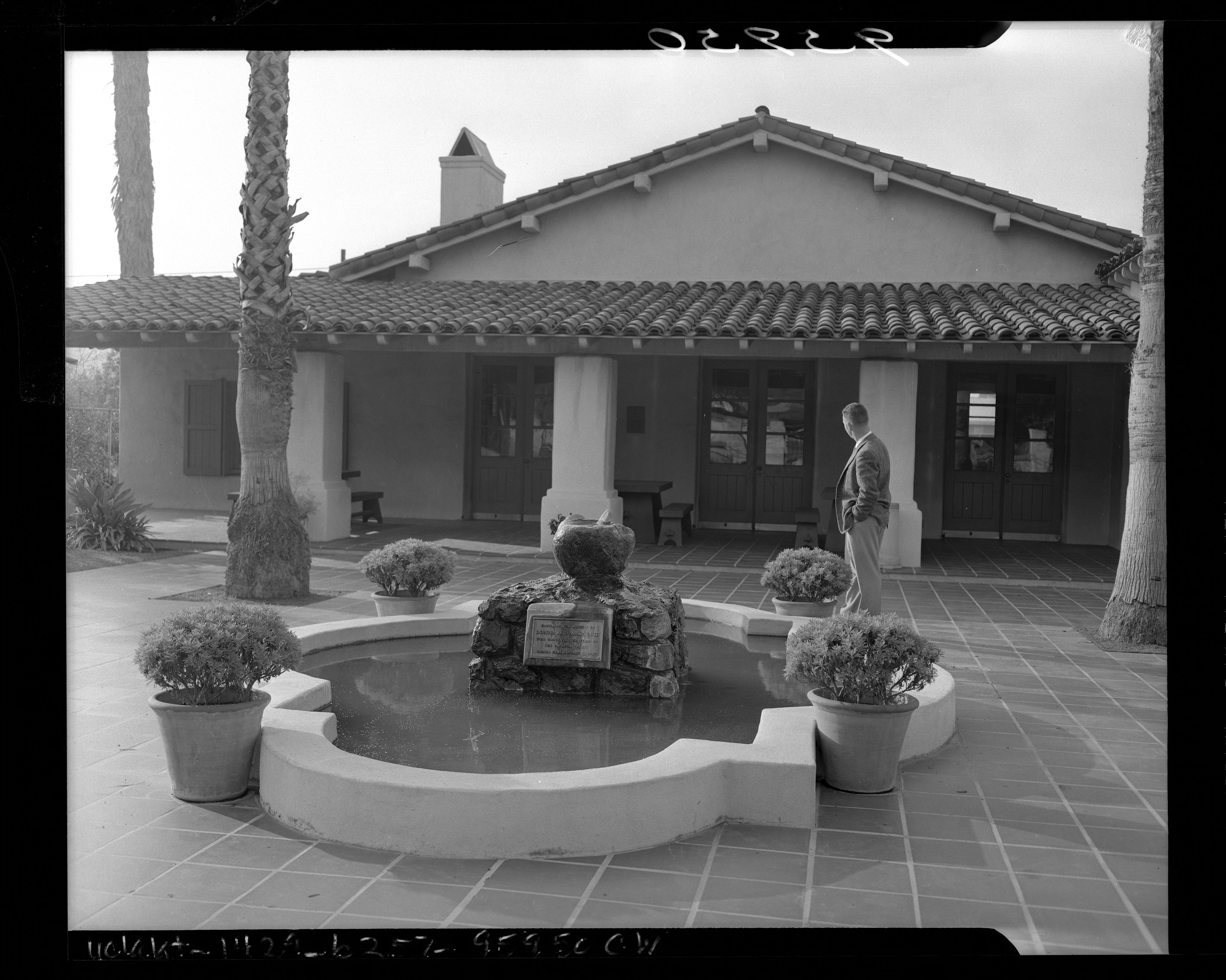
Know Your City No. 78 Memorial fountain and courtyard of Campo de Cahuenga, Calif. (Los Angeles Times, Feb. 3, 1956)

The original adobe structure was demolished in 1900. The city of Los Angeles provided funds for the purchase of the property in 1923, and a Mission Revival and Spanish Colonial Revival style replica "adobe" ranch house was built by the city following an effort led by Mrs. A.S.C. Forbes and Irene T. Lindsay, then president of the San Fernando Valley Historical Society, and dedicated on November 2, 1950. It is now a park and interpretive center managed by the City of Los Angeles's Department of Recreation and Parks in partnership with the Campo de Cahuenga Historical Memorial Association. Campo de Cahuenga is registered on the National Register of Historic Places, as California Historical Landmark No. 151, and as Los Angeles Historic-Cultural Monument No. 29.

The foundations of the original adobe were unearthed beneath Lankershim Boulevard during construction of the Metro B Line subway. The parts of the foundations within the park are preserved as an exhibit, and the "footprint" of the foundations under the street and sidewalk is marked by decorative pavement.

Campo de Cahuenga is often confused with the nearby Rancho Cahuenga, an inholding within the Rancho Providencia land grant, now part of Burbank.

The building is used by various organizations for special programs and regular meetings, and it is open on Tuesdays, Thursdays, Fridays 10 AM to 4 PM and Saturdays from 10 AM to 2 PM.

== California Historical Landmark ==
California Historical Landmark Marker No. 151 at the site reads:

- NO. 151 CAMPO DE CAHUENGA - 'Here was made the Capitulation of Cahuenga by Captain Andrés Pico, commanding forces for Mexico, and Lieutenant-Colonel J. C. Frémont, U.S. Navy, for the United States. By this treaty, agreed upon January 13th, 1847, the United States acquired California - finally secured to us by the treaty of Guadalupe Hidalgo, made February 2nd, 1848.'

== See also ==
- Battle of Cahuenga Pass – 1831
- Battle of Providencia – 1845 Second Battle of Cahuenga Pass
- Conquest of California – 1846 Alta California
- Category:Conquest of California – 1846–1848
- Cahuenga, California; Tongva settlement.
- Tongva—Tongva language
- History of California through 1899
- History of the San Fernando Valley to 1915
- List of Los Angeles Historic-Cultural Monuments in the San Fernando Valley – city
- List of Registered Historic Places in Los Angeles – state
- Category: National Register of Historic Places in the San Fernando Valley – federal
