= Verdugo Mountains =

Mountain range of the Transverse Ranges in California, United States

- Verdugos
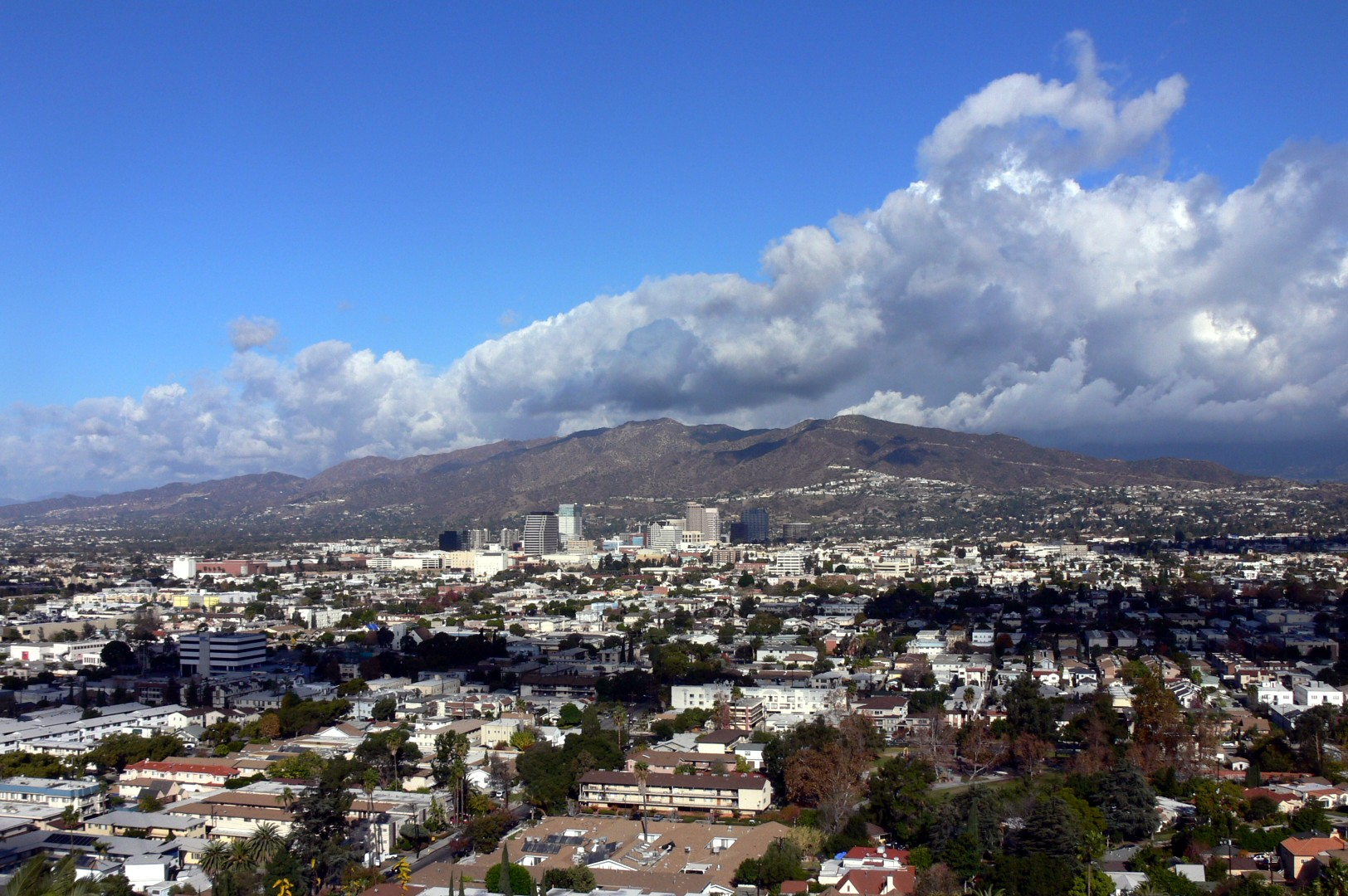
- Verdugo Mountains, south view

Highest point
- Peak: Verdugo Peak
- Elevation: 3,126 ft (953 m)

Geography
- Location within California
- Country: United States
- State: California
- District: Los Angeles County
- Range coordinates: 34°13′N 118°17′W
- Parent range: Transverse Ranges
- Topo map: USGS Burbank

The Verdugo Mountains, also known as the Verdugo Hills or simply The Verdugos, are a small, rugged mountain range of the Transverse Ranges system in Los Angeles County, California. Located just south of the western San Gabriel Mountains, the Verdugo Mountains region incorporates the cities of Burbank, Glendale, Pasadena, and La Cañada Flintridge; the unincorporated communities of Altadena and La Crescenta-Montrose; as well as the City of Los Angeles neighborhood of Sunland-Tujunga. It is where the borders of the San Gabriel Valley and the San Fernando Valley meet.

Surrounded entirely by urban development, the Verdugo Mountains represent an isolated wildlife island and are in large part under public ownership in the form of undeveloped parkland. The mountains are used primarily for recreation in the form of hiking and mountain biking, and as the site of communications installations on the highest peaks.

The mountains arise directly from the eastern floor of the San Fernando Valley, exaggerating their height from some vantages. Beginning with foothills, they rapidly rise to rugged sections, with the highest peaks topping 3,000 feet (910 m).

== Geography ==
The northwest-trending range is approximately 8 miles (13 km) long by 3.25 miles (5.23 km) wide, and roughly parallels the southern front of the San Gabriel Mountains at a distance of 1 mile (1.6 km) to 2 miles (3.2 km), with the Crescenta Valley lying between the two. The southern front of the range forms part of the northeastern boundary of the San Fernando Valley; at their southeastern end the Verdugo Mountains are separated from the San Rafael Hills by the Verdugo Wash.

The highest summit at 3,126 feet (953 m) is the informally named Verdugo Peak, located near the center of the range and rising to approximately 2,200 feet (670 m) above its southern base. Other peaks include Tongva Peak 2,656 feet (810 m), recently named in honor of the Tongva (Gabrielino) people, the original inhabitants of much of the Los Angeles Basin, Santa Monica Mountains, and San Gabriel Valley areas. Other informally named peaks are Mount La Tuna on the north end and Mount Thom on the south end of the range. With the exception of Mount La Tuna, all these summits, as well as several others, are occupied by communications towers.

The Verdugo Mountains lie within the corporate boundaries of the cities of Glendale, Burbank, and Los Angeles. The neighborhood of La Crescenta, most of which lies within Glendale, is adjacent to the range's northern end, as are the Los Angeles neighborhoods of Tujunga, Sunland, Shadow Hills, and Sun Valley (the last of which includes La Tuna Canyon).

== Geology ==
The Verdugo Mountains consist of an east-west-trending antiformal fault block, bounded on the south by the Verdugo Fault, a north-dipping reverse fault, and on the north by the Sierra Madre thrust fault near the front of the San Gabriel Mountains, thus including the sediment-covered Crescenta Valley within the Verdugo Mountains Block. The Verdugo Fault lies slightly south of the topographic range front and is completely covered by sediments.

The rocks within the Verdugo Mountains block are almost entirely igneous and metamorphic similar to the crystalline basement rocks exposed to the north in that portion of the San Gabriel Mountains south of the San Gabriel Fault. These consist of gneiss, and gneissic diorite and quartz diorite, intruded by irregular bodies of equigranular granitic rocks, predominantly quartz diorite and granodiorite, with accompanying pegmatite and aplite. Exposed rocks in the Shadow Hills neighborhood at the extreme northwestern end of the Verdugos are typically marine sedimentary rocks of Miocene age, predominantly sandstone and shale.

The Verdugo Mountains are part of the western Transverse Ranges, which have risen in the last 7 million years as the result of contractional deformation resulting from transpressional motion and rotation of crustal blocks in the "Big Bend" region of the San Andreas Fault. The amount of crustal shortening since the beginning of the Pliocene has been estimated to be on the order of 7 kilometers (4.3 mi). The Verdugo fault and Sierra Madre thrust are part of a complex system of faults that accommodate some of this shortening and generally become younger to the south, with the Verdugo Fault possibly being the youngest member of this system and forming the current boundary between this portion of the western Transverse Ranges and the Los Angeles basin. Uplift along the Verdugo fault may total approximately 2.5 km (1.6 mi), at a minimum rate of 1.1 km (0.68 mi) per million years since 2.3 million years ago, moving the crystalline rocks of the Verdugo Mountains up and over younger Tertiary and Quaternary sediments to the south. The Verdugo Mountains are, therefore, young and rapidly rising, reflected in their steep topography and rapid rates of erosion.

== Municipalities and neighborhoods ==
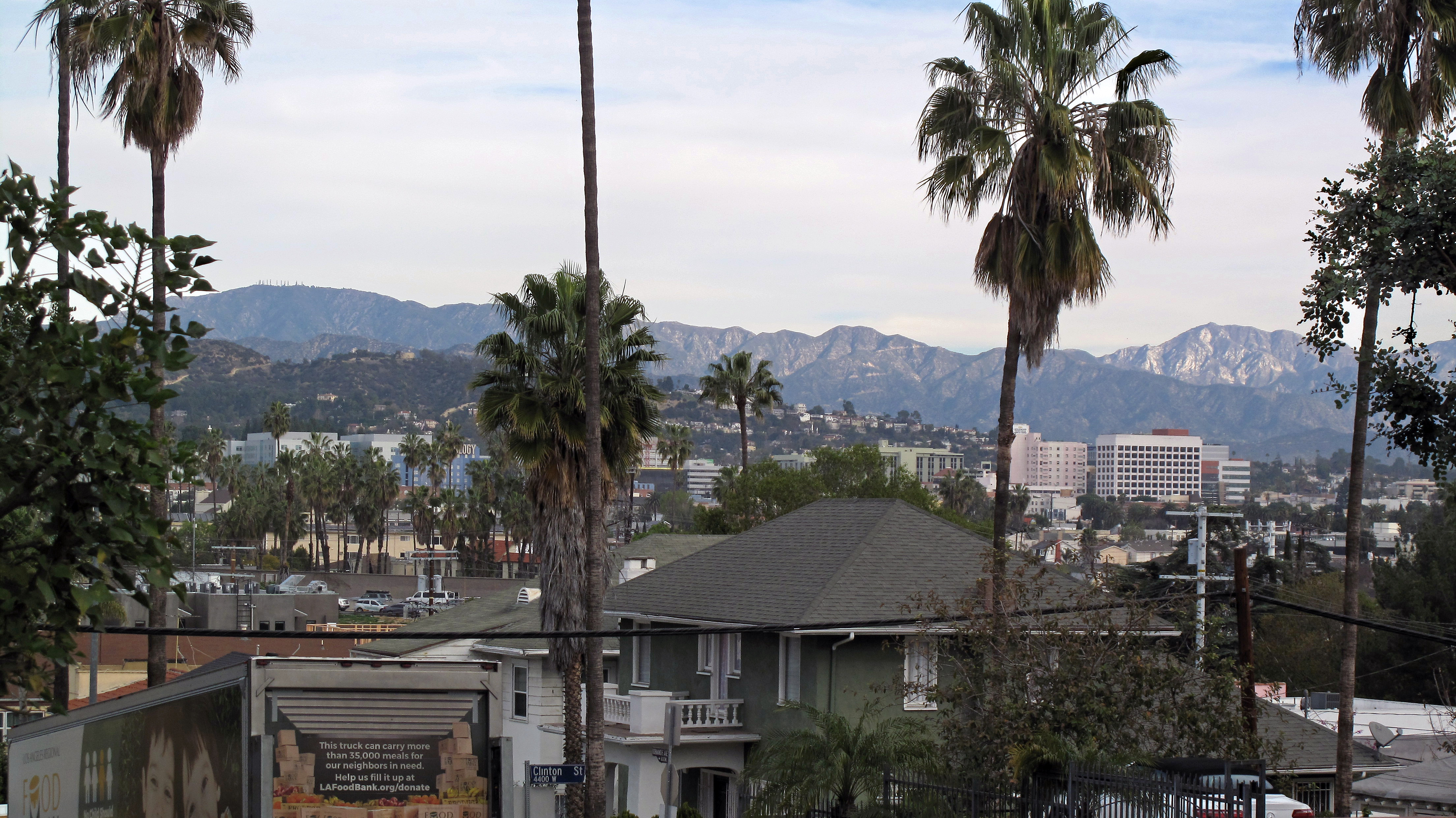
View of Verdugo Mountains from Normandie Ave, Los Angeles

=== Incorporated cities (independent) ===
- Glendale
- Pasadena
- La Cañada Flintridge
- Burbank

=== Unincorporated communities ===
- Altadena
- La Crescenta-Montrose

=== Neighborhoods in the City of Los Angeles ===
- Sunland-Tujunga

== Flora, fauna and climate ==
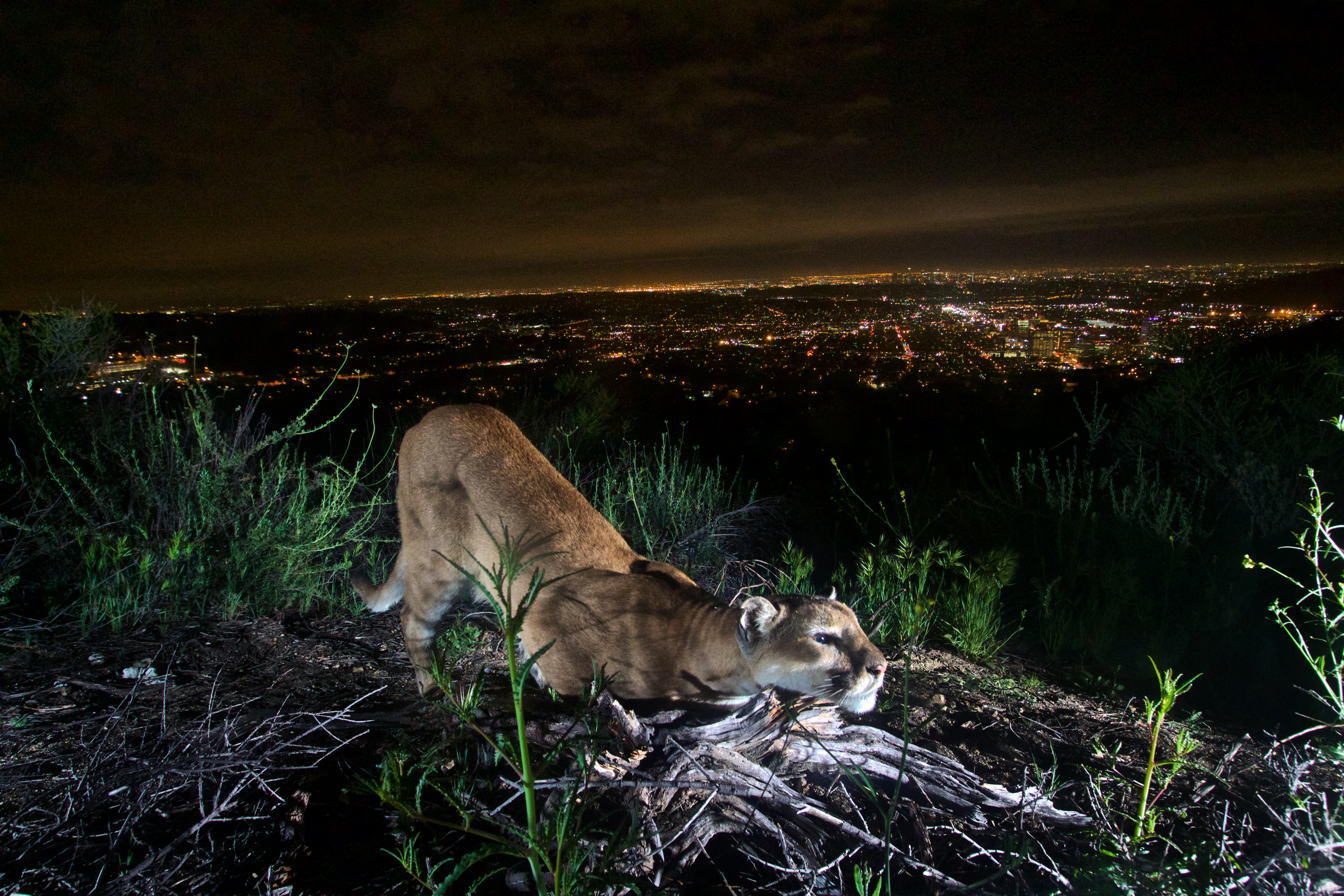
An adult female mountain lion is "cheek-rubbing," leaving her scent on a log. Taken in the Verdugo Mountains with Glendale and downtown L.A. in the background. - National Park Service

The Verdugo Mountains lie almost entirely within the chaparral plant community, as defined by Munz and later authors, including Sawyer et al. This dense, shrub-dominated community of the California chaparral and woodlands is more highly developed on the north-facing slopes than on the drier, hotter south-facing slopes. Among the shrub species that characterize this community, prominent in the Verdugos are laurel sumac (Malosma laurina), toyon (Heteromeles arbutifolia), poison oak (Toxicodendron diversilobum), chamise (Adenostoma fasciculatum) and two species of California-lilac (Ceanothus crassifolius and Ceanothus oliganthus). Native trees are restricted to protected canyons, especially on the shadier north slope of the range, where soil moisture levels are higher. Coast live oak (Quercus agrifolia), California bay laurel (Umbellularia californica), California sycamore (Platanus racemosa), California walnut (Juglans californica), and several species of willow (Salix spp.) are the most common native trees. Non-native trees, particularly pines (Pinus spp.), cypress (Cupressus spp.), locust (Robinia pseudoacacia), and Australian eucalyptus (Eucalyptus spp.) have been planted locally along the fire roads and, most notably, in the Fire Warden's Grove, established in the wake of a wildfire in 1927.

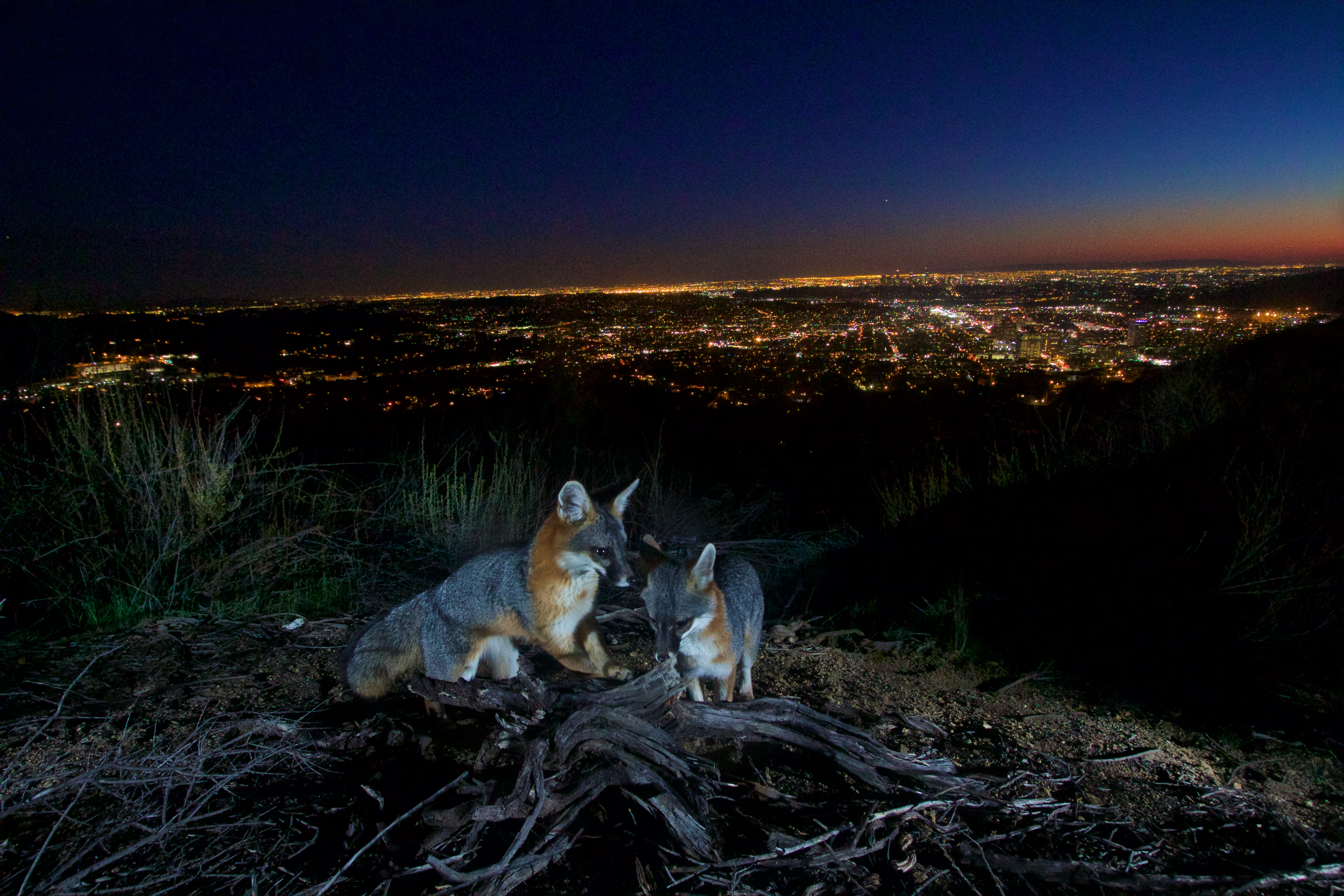
Two gray foxes in the Verdugo Mountains with Los Angeles in the background. - National Park Service

Except for a tenuous link to the large wild area in the San Gabriel Mountains through Big Tujunga Wash at their northwestern end, the Verdugo Mountains are an urban wildlife island completely surrounded by development. Among the large mammals, coyote (Canis latrans) and mule deer (Odocoileus hemionus) are the most common; mountain lions (Puma concolor) and black bears (Ursus americanus) have occasionally been reported. The many rodent species support a population of western rattlesnakes (Crotalus viridis). Of the numerous bird species present, the most characteristic of the chaparral here, and throughout California, is the small, seldom seen but often heard wrentit (Chamaea fasciata). With its call of three or four chirps followed by an accelerating trill, often likened to the sound of a dropped ping-pong ball, the wrentit provides the most characteristic sound of the chaparral.

The Verdugo Mountains have warm, dry summers and cool wet winters. Snow infrequently falls along the crest during the coldest winter storms, but melts rapidly. Annual average precipitation increases with elevation (due to the orographic lift effect), from 17–21 inches at the base to about 24–28 inches at the crest. Annual rainfall totals are highly variable from year to year, with the higher totals usually in El Nino years. Most of the rain falls between November and March during periodic frontal passages.

== History ==
The mountains were part of the indigenous Tongva people's homelands for over 7,000 years, with villages at some springs in the canyons. The village of Wikangna was located in the area, possibly located at what is now the Verdugo Hills Golf Course.

The Verdugo Mountains were named for Jose Maria Verdugo, holder of the Rancho San Rafael land grant, which covered the mountains during California's Spanish and Mexican periods. On October 20, 1784 Pedro Fages, the military governor of Alta California, granted Jose Maria Verdugo permission to use the rancho, known officially by the name San Rafael but informally called "La Zanja" by Verdugo. The rancho's boundaries were primarily defined by the Verdugo Mountains, the Arroyo Seco and the Los Angeles River, with the boundary following north along the east bank of the river and wrapping westerly around Griffith Park to a point near the Travel Town Museum in the park.

=== Glendale & Mount Verdugo Railway ===
One of the earliest attempts to access and develop the interior of the Verdugo Mountains was the 1912 proposal by Colonel Lewis Ginger to build a cable incline railroad to the summit of Mount Verdugo, now known as Mount Thom. The proposed Glendale & Verdugo Mountain Railway was to run in a straight line from the Pacific Electric's Casa Verdugo station at the top of Brand Boulevard to the summit of Mount Verdugo, employing cars with stepped seating similar to those of Angels Flight on Bunker Hill in Los Angeles. Initially, Colonel Ginger had proposed that his cable railway would lift a Pacific Electric car directly to the summit, but Henry E. Huntington did not approve of this scheme. The railway was to have four or five stations along the incline and a large visitor center at the summit. Several months after the initial proposal, the route was altered to run up the west side of Verdugo Canyon from a hoped-for extension of the Pacific Electric up Verdugo Canyon to Montrose. Interest in the cable railway continued for about a year, but the project was abandoned before a company could be formed, largely as the result of the Pacific Electric's decision not to build the Montrose extension.

== Wildfire ==
Fire is a natural component of the chaparral ecosystem, and the plants that comprise it are largely adapted to survive fire or to reproduce after it. More specifically, the members of this plant community are adapted to a particular fire regime, which is characterized by intensity and seasonality, but most importantly, by the frequency of fires. In the southern California chaparral, natural frequencies of 30 to 40 years are typical, with some areas going as long as 100 years without fires and others burning more frequently. It has been estimated the chaparral plant community can persist over the long term only with a fire frequency at a given site of no shorter than several decades, or perhaps longer, although there is variability in the tolerance of different species. Repeated shorter intervals between fires promote so-called "type conversion", in which the shrubby species are replaced by grasses, particularly non-native grasses, and other weedy species.

The Verdugo Mountains have been subject to repeated wildfires in historical times. Major occurrences in the twentieth century include the December, 1927 Burbank Canyon Fire, which started in Haines Canyon in the San Gabriel Mountains and burned south into the range, consuming approximately 100 homes in Burbank's Sunset Canyon. The La Tuna Canyon Fire of November, 1955 burned over almost the entire western portion of the range, ultimately destroying approximately 4,500 acres (1,800 ha). The Whiting Woods Fire of March, 1964, started by a power line downed by high winds, burned from the northern edge of the range southward over to crest to consume homes in Glendale. A fire in November, 1980, also called the La Tuna Canyon Fire, burned 10,000 acres (4,000 ha) in the northern and western portions of the range. Since 2000, three major fires have occurred in the Verdugo Mountains. In September, 2002, the Mountain Fire burned over two days approximately 750 acres (300 ha) above Glendale, largely on the southern side of the range. The Harvard Fire started on September 29, 2005, and consumed 1,024 acres (414 ha) both north and south sides of the range north of Burbank during a six-day period. In September, 2017, the La Tuna fire started north of the Verdugos, jumping Interstate 210 forcing the closure of it, burning both the north and south face of the ranges. The fire ultimately destroyed four homes and 7,003 acres (2,834 ha) of land.

Beginning in 1921, the Los Angeles County Fire Department began a county-wide program of building fire breaks (or more properly, fuel breaks) to slow the spread of fire, and by 1923 the initial breaks had been constructed in the Verdugos. In 1934, the City of Glendale built a 60-foot lookout tower on Verdugo Peak, which was staffed with an observer until it closed in the mid-1950s. In order to conduct the work necessary to build fire breaks and roads, temporary construction camps were located throughout the fire-prone areas of the county. In the Verdugo Mountains, Construction Camp #2 was located in the lower reaches of Deer Canyon, at the end of present-day Beaudry Blvd, for a period during the late 1930s and early 1940s. It is difficult to determine from published sources the dates of construction for the fire roads so important to present-day recreational use of the mountains. The report of the 1955 La Tuna Canyon fire, however, indicates that at least some of these roads were in place by that date.

== Protected areas ==
- Verdugo Mountains State Park, California Department of Parks and Recreation
- Verdugo Mountains Open Space Preserve, jointly operated by the Santa Monica Mountains Conservancy and the City of Glendale
- Brand Park, Glendale
- Stough Canyon Nature Center, Burbank
- Wildwood Canyon Park, Burbank
- La Tuna Canyon Park, Los Angeles
- Tujunga Ponds, Los Angeles

The Verdugo Mountains are being considered as part of the proposed Rim of the Valley Corridor National Park.

== Access and recreational use ==
Other than the Foothill Freeway (I-210) and the nearly parallel La Tuna Canyon Road, both of which traverse only the northwestern tip of the range, the Verdugo Mountains are crossed by no paved roads. By contrast, the range contains more than 25 miles (40 km) of graded and well maintained fire roads that are used extensively by hikers and mountain bike riders. Several abandoned and overgrown fire roads and ridge-top fire breaks are used recreationally as well. Trails, in the sense of engineered and maintained footpaths, are few, the most notable being the 2.2 mile (3.5 km)-long La Tuna Canyon Trail, which was constructed in 1989 by the Los Angeles Conservation Corps with funds provided by the Santa Monica Mountains Conservancy.

== See also ==
- La Tuna Fire

== Maps ==
- Angeles Front Country Trail Map. San Rafael, California: Tom Harrison Maps, 2001. ISBN 1-877689-65-3.
- Verdugo Mountains trail map. Matt Maxon, 2005 http://pctmap.homeip.net/data/PDF/Verdugo%20Mtns%2001-16-05.pdf
- Burbank, California, 7.5 minute topographic quadrangle map. United States Geological Survey.
- Pasadena, California, 7.5 minute topographic quadrangle map. United States Geological Survey.
- Mount La Tuna - 34.22327°N 118.33763°W
- Verdugo Peak - 34.21518°N 118.28001°W
- Tongva Peak - 34.19722°N 118.25833°W
- Mount Thom - 34.18717°N 118.25596°W
