= Cahuenga Branch Library =

- U.S. National Register of Historic Places
- Los Angeles Historic-Cultural Monument
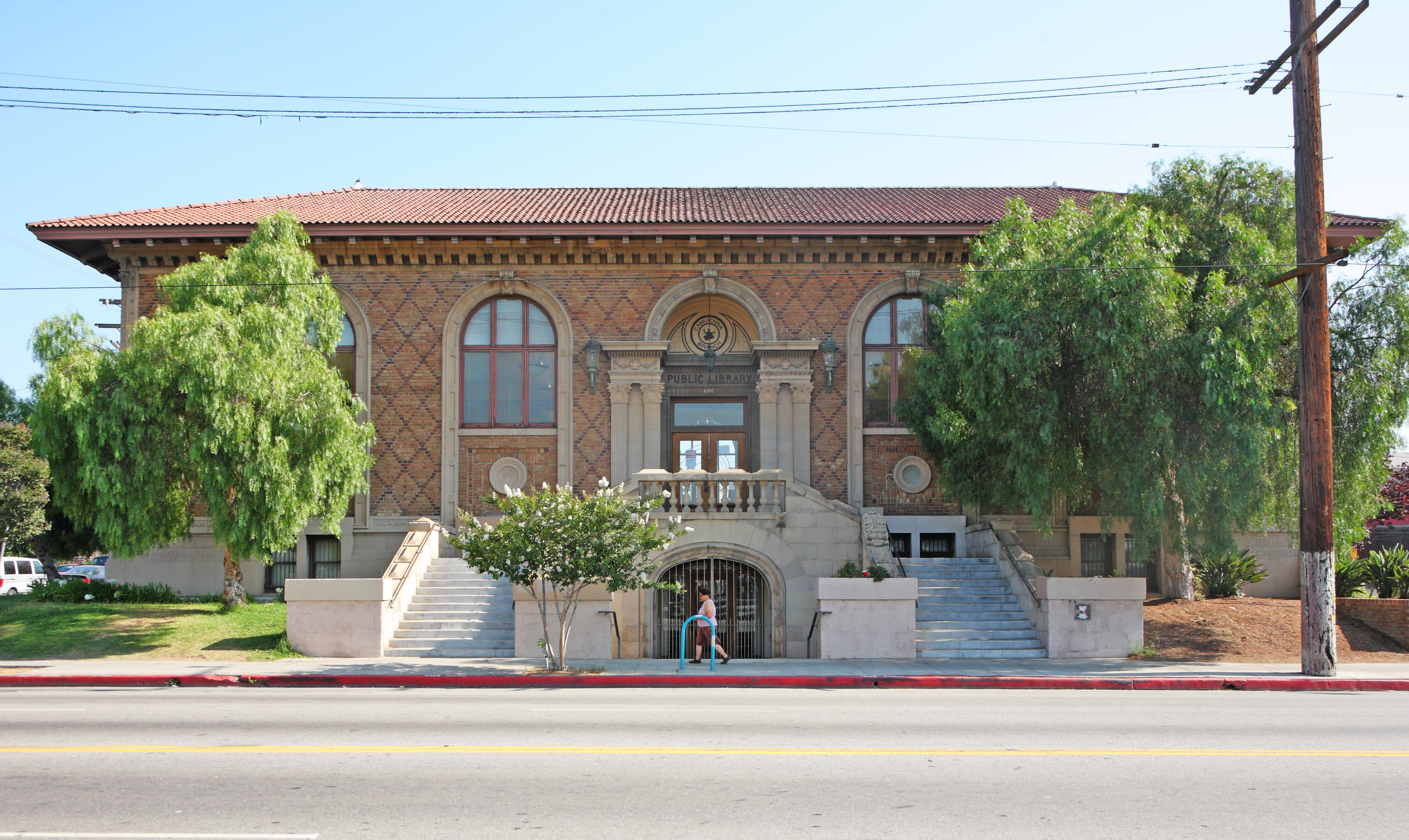
- The building in 2008

- Location within the Los Angeles metropolitan area Location within California Location within the United States
- Location: 4591 Santa Monica Blvd., Los Angeles, California
- Coordinates: 34°5′28″N 118°17′17″W
- Built: 1916
- Architect: Russell, C.H.
- Architectural style: Italian Renaissance Revival, Late 19th And 20th Century Revivals
- MPS: Los Angeles Branch Library System
- NRHP reference No.: 87001006
- LAHCM No.: 314

Significant dates
- Added to NRHP: May 19, 1987
- Designated LAHCM: October 24, 1986

Cahuenga Branch is the third oldest branch library facility in the Los Angeles Public Library system. Located at 4591 Santa Monica Boulevard in the East Hollywood section of Los Angeles, it was built in 1916 with a grant from Andrew Carnegie. One of three surviving Carnegie libraries in Los Angeles, it has been designated as a Historic-Cultural Monument and listed in the National Register of Historic Places.

== Architecture and design ==
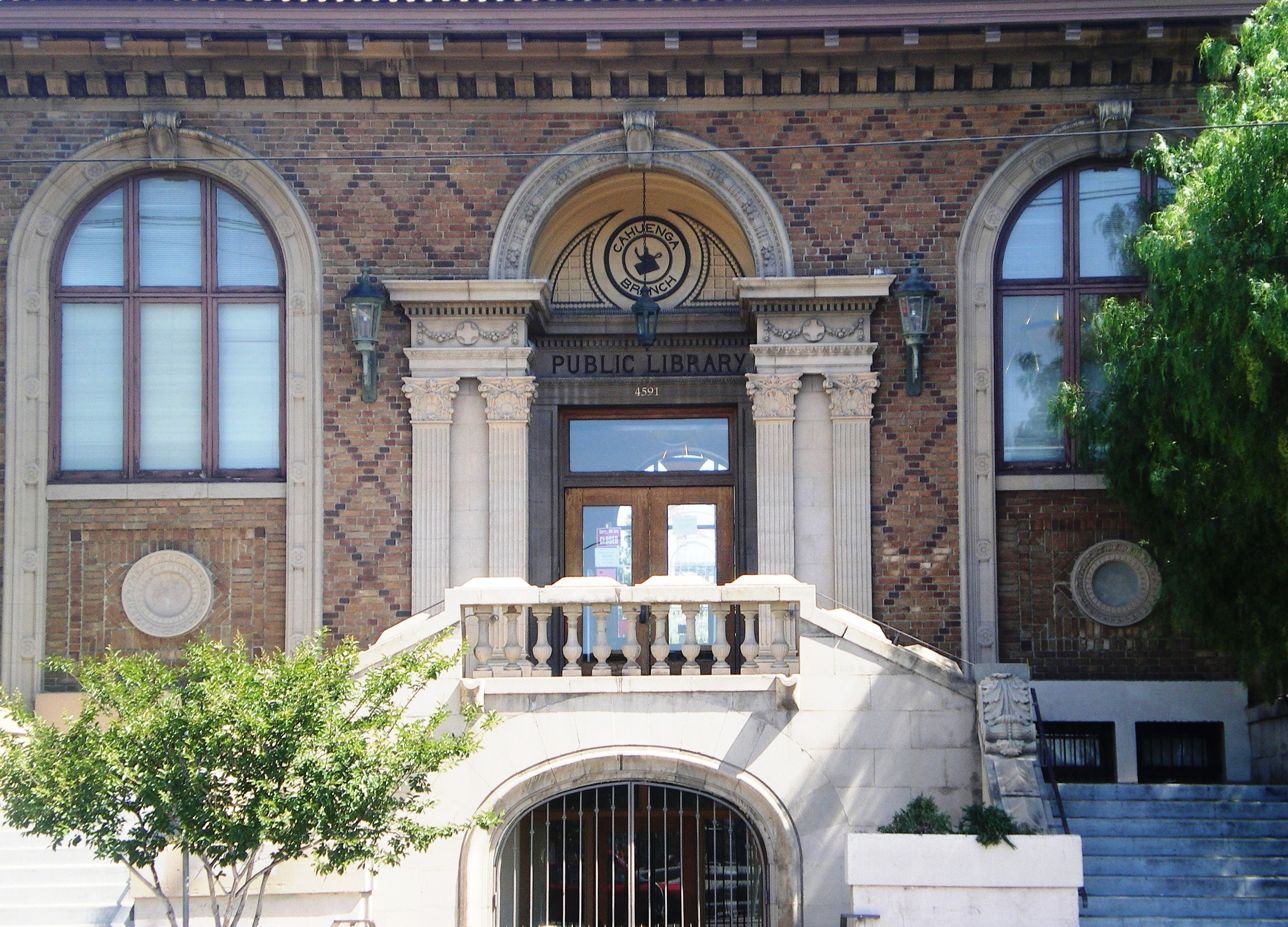
Entrance to Cahuenga Branch

Cahuenga Branch was built brick and concrete and designed in the Italian Renaissance Revival style. The building features a low-pitched overhanging hip roof made of clay tiles, a tawny-colored tapestry-designed brick facade, and a high basement. The front is symmetrical and is dominated by a large, formal entranceway featuring a double stairway with matching volutes that connect the sidewalk to a veranda with balustrade outside the entrance to the building.

Cahuenga Branch was built in a clover leaf or butterfly pattern allowing the entire floor to be supervised from the center. When built, the building included a children's department, fiction section, reference room, adult reading room, open air reading room, overflow reading room, and a basement with an auditorium that sat 300.

== History ==
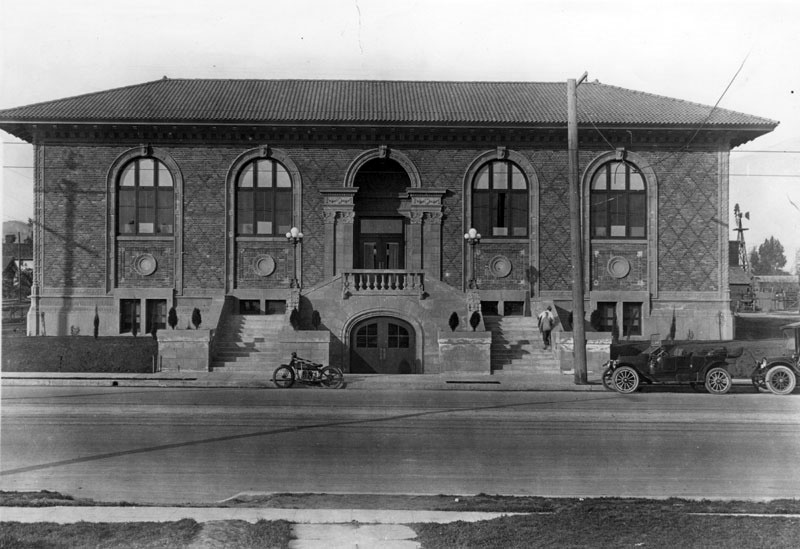
The building in 1916

Caheunga Branch was built in 1916, cost $34,000 ($1.01 million in 2025) to construct, and was the last of six branch libraries built with a $210,000 grant from Andrew Carnegie. The architect was Clarence H. Russell, who also associated with Norman F. Marsh in building the canals in Venice, Los Angeles. Though this building and equipment were paid for through the Carnegie grant, the land itself was purchased by the city, the cost paid through an assessment district. It opened on December 4, 1916.

Carnegie Branch was originally planned for the corner of Santa Monica Boulevard and Vermont Avenue, but land at nearby Santa Monica and Madison was less expensive. Even so, the branch was situated amongst many educational, cultural and medical institutions: UCLA's original campus was located nearby and after it moved, its old campus was occupied by what became Los Angeles City College. Also within one mile (1.6 km) of the branch are the Braille Institute, Barnsdall Art Park (site of Frank Lloyd Wright's Hollyhock House), KCET's public television station, Children's Hospital, and Queen of Angels-Hollywood Presbyterian Hospital. The branches proximity to these centers led to great demand for its resources.

During World War I, Cahuenga Branch and other libraries were used for war-related activities. At the same time, more than one hundred people regularly attended singing events at the library; the 1918 flu epidemic, however, put an end to such gatherings.

In the 1960s and 1970s, an increasing amount of Asians, Latinos, Russians, and Armenians moved into the neighborhood around Cahuenga Branch. As a response, in the early 1970s, Cahuenga Branch received funds from the federal government to hire a multi-lingual staff, offer classes in English and citizenship, and host live entertainment and festivals for the new community.

From 1990 to 1996, Cahuenga Branch relocated to 4627 Santa Monica Boulevard while the original building underwent renovation and a seismic retrofit. The renovation work included the installation of computer work stations and other technological upgrades as part of the "Libraries Online!" project funded by Bill Gates and Microsoft Corporation. Upon reopening, columnist Patt Morrison wrote that before the branch closed, it was "a dark and grotty hole" and "the scariest place I ever worked."

The library celebrated its 100th anniversary on December 3, 2016 with a public celebration that included family entertainment, a lecture on the Carnegie libraries, an information fair featuring the Los Angeles Public Library and other community organizations, a music performance by students from Lockwood Avenue Elementary School, and speeches by City Councilmember Mitch O'Farrell and City Librarian John Szabo. In the week prior to the event, the library was repainted, cleaned, repaired, landscaped, and new bicycle racks were installed.

=== Historic designation ===
Cahuenga Branch was designated Los Angeles Historic-Cultural Monument #314 in 1986. A year later, it and several other branches were added to the National Register of Historic Places as part of a thematic group submission.

In December 2016, for the library's centennial, a plaque recognizing the building's Historic-Cultural Monument designation was installed inside the library. Additionally, a sign was placed in front of the library, commemorating its 100th anniversary and Historic-Cultural Monument status.

== See also ==
- List of Registered Historic Places in Los Angeles
- Los Angeles Public Library
