= Tuyunga =

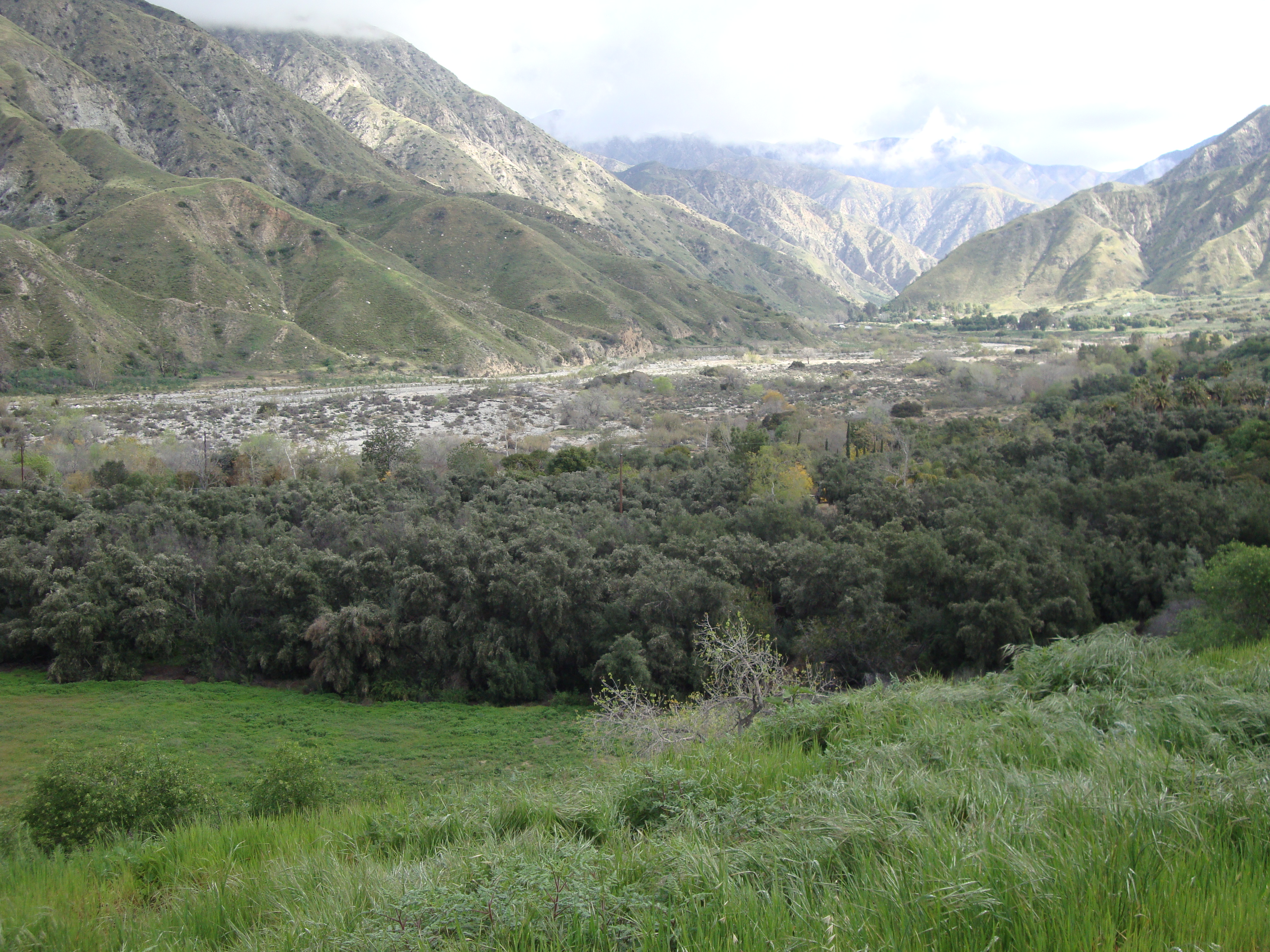
Big Tujunga Canyon (2011)

Tuyunga or Tujunga (Tongva: Tuhuunga, “place of the old woman”) is a former Tongva (Fernandeño) village now located at Sunland-Tujunga, Los Angeles in Los Angeles County, California. The village was located near the original Rancho Los Encinos that became the Mission San Fernando Rey de España in the San Fernando Valley.

People of the village frequently intermarried with people from neighboring Chumash villages. The nearby valley renamed Crescenta Valley by the Spanish was potentially used as a seasonal hunting location with access to the waters of the canyon. The Tongva regularly cultivated plants in the region, as reported by a Spanish survey of the area in 1795, who sought to exploit the site for the construction of another mission.

== Toponymy ==
The village name is referred to in the following places:

- Big Tujunga Creek, major stream in Los Angeles County
- Big Tujunga Dam, dam in Los Angeles County
- Sunland-Tujunga, Los Angeles, a neighborhood in the city of Los Angeles
- Tujunga Wash Greenway, a cycling route
- Tujunga Wash, a tributary of the Los Angeles River
- Rancho Tujunga, a former rancho

== See also ==
- Tovaangar
