= San Rafael Hills =

Mountain range of the Transverse Ranges in California, United States

- Location within California

Highest point
- Elevation: 1,890 ft (580 m)

Geography
- Country: United States
- State: California
- County: Los Angeles County
- Municipality: San Marino and South Pasadena
- Range coordinates: 34°10′47.022″N 118°12′38.265″W
- Parent range: Transverse Ranges
- Topo map: USGS Pasadena

The San Rafael Hills are a range of hills in Los Angeles County, California. They are one of the lower Transverse Ranges, and are parallel to and below the San Gabriel Mountains, adjacent to the San Gabriel Valley overlooking the Los Angeles Basin.

== Geography ==
To the west, the Verdugo Wash separates the San Rafael Hills from the Verdugo Mountains, and to the east, the Arroyo Seco separates them from the San Gabriel Valley. They are separated from the Repetto Hills to the south by the Eagle Rock Fault, which separates the plutonic igneous rock of the San Rafael Hills from the Tertiary-period sedimentary formations of the Repetto Hills.

The San Rafael Hills are part of the communities of La Cañada Flintridge, Pasadena, Glendale, and Eagle Rock. They retain a large aquifer on the hills' north side, from the San Gabriel Valley.

== History ==
They were the homeland, with settlements, of the Tongva Native American people for over 8,000 years before the Spanish invasion and colonization of the late 18th century. They are named after the Rancho San Rafael, a 1784 Spanish land grant beyond the hills to the west.

== Landmarks ==
The hillside campus of Art Center College of Design, a Pasadena historic resource, is located in the San Rafael Hills.

Descanso Gardens, a botanical garden in La Cañada Flintridge, California is located on the northern edge of the hills.

Flintridge Sacred Heart Academy, a private all-girls Catholic high school, sits atop the crest of the San Rafael Hills.

== See also ==
- Verdugo Mountains
- Chino Hills
- Puente Hills
- San Gabriel Mountains
- Casa Adobe De San Rafael
