= Tujunga =

Tujunga can refer to a few different things:

- Tujunga, the Tongva village
- Tujunga (fly), a genus of picture-winged fly
- Sunland-Tujunga, Los Angeles, a neighborhood of the San Fernando Valley
- Rancho Tujunga, a Mexican land grant that became Sunland and Tujunga, LA
- Tujunga Wash, a tributary of the Los Angeles River
- Big Tujunga Creek, which flows to the Tujunga Wash
- Big Tujunga Dam, spanning Big Tujunga Canyon in Los Angeles County
