= Big Tujunga Creek =

Big Tujunga Creek Tujunga Creek, Tujunga River, Tujunga Wash
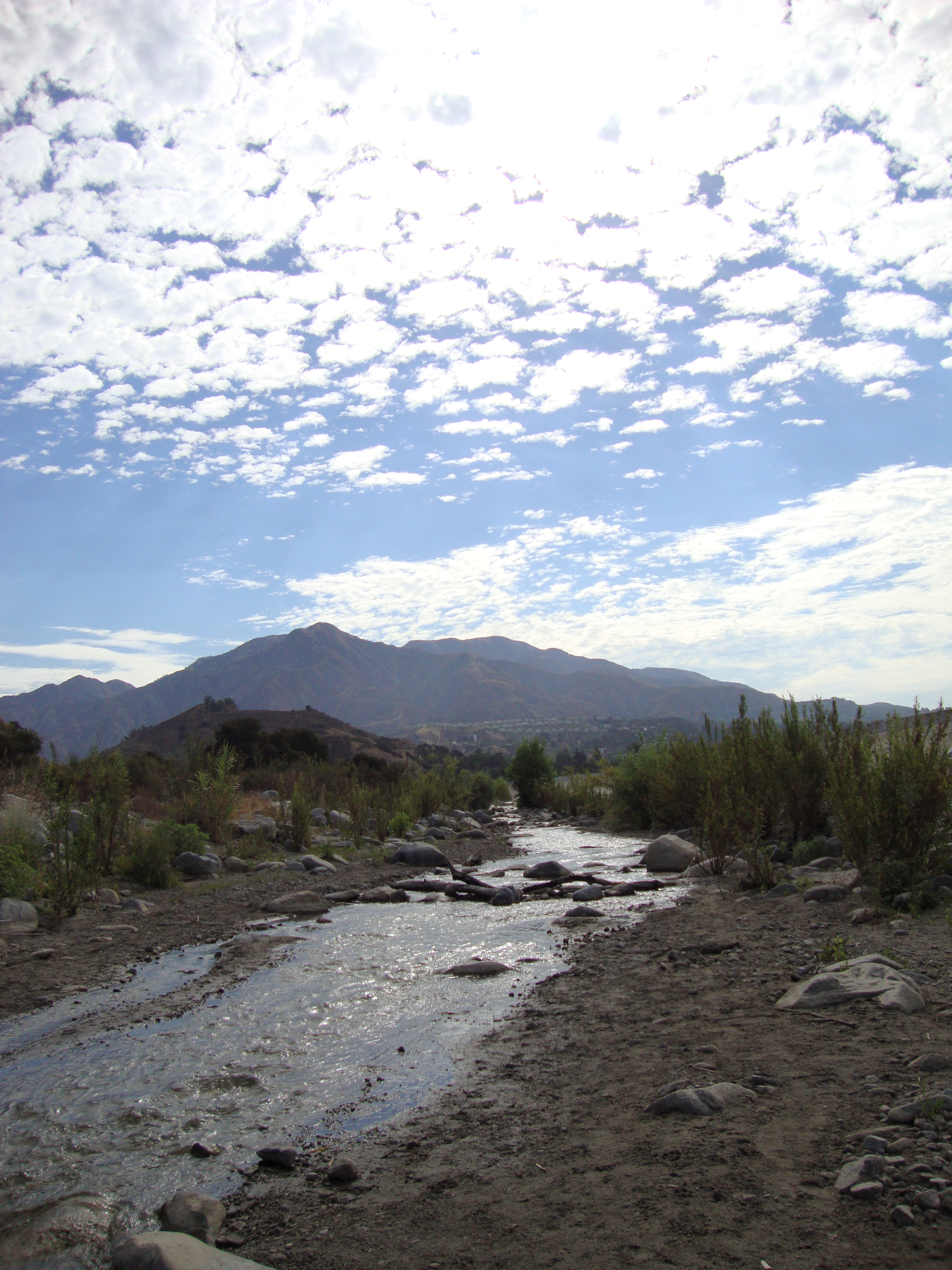
- The wash in lower Big Tujunga Canyon

Location
- Country: United States
- State: California
- Cities: Sunland, Shadow Hills

Physical characteristics
- Source: About 1.6 miles (2.6 km) south-southeast of Mount Mooney
  - location: San Gabriel Mountains
  - coordinates: 34°17′52″N 118°00′11″W
  - elevation: 5,768 ft (1,758 m)
- Mouth: Tujunga Wash
  - location: Upstream of Hansen Dam
  - coordinates: 34°16′05″N 118°21′50″W
  - elevation: 1,070 ft (330 m)
- Length: 22 mi (35 km)
- Basin size: 130 mi^{2} (340 km^{2})
- Discharge
  - location: near Sunland
  - average: 28.1 cu ft/s (0.80 m^{3}/s)
  - minimum: 0.29 cu ft/s (0.0082 m^{3}/s)
  - maximum: 50,000 cu ft/s (1,400 m^{3}/s)
- Discharge
  - location: below Hansen Dam
  - average: 22.2 cu ft/s (0.63 m^{3}/s)

Basin features
- Tributaries
  - left: Lucas Creek, Clear Creek
  - right: Alder Creek, Mill Creek, Fox Creek, Trail Canyon Creek

Big Tujunga Creek is a major stream in Los Angeles County in the U.S. state of California. From its headwaters high in the San Gabriel Mountains, it flows generally southwest for 28.8 miles (46.3 km), joining Little Tujunga Creek to form the Tujunga Wash near Pacoima. The stream is sometimes considered as one with the Tujunga Wash, which is the continuation of Big Tujunga to the Los Angeles River, bringing the total length to more than 40 miles (64 km). The name of the stream is derived from a Tongva village name.

== Course ==
The creek rises near the Angeles Crest Highway in Upper Big Tujunga Canyon, deep within the Angeles National Forest. Its upper course is steep and rocky, and sprinkled with rapids, riffles and small waterfalls. It flows west then northwest, receiving Alder Creek and Lynx Gulch from the right and Wildcat Gulch and Wickiup Creek from the left. As the stream cuts deeper into its gorge, it receives a major tributary, Mill Creek, from the right, and Fall Creek also from the right just before emptying into Big Tujunga Reservoir, formed by the Big Tujunga Dam. While part of the reservoir, it receives Fox Creek from the right.

Below the dam, the stream flows through a steep rocky gorge, receiving Clear Creek from the left, before turning northwest into a broader valley. It flows through this valley for several miles before receiving Trail Canyon Creek from the right, and swinging southwards around a few ridges spills out of the mountains near Sunland. Part of the stream is diverted at Sunland into spreading grounds in order to recharge the local aquifer. The rest of Big Tujunga Creek continues west into the usually dry Hansen Flood Control Basin, formed by the Hansen Dam. Here it receives Little Tujunga Creek also from the right, and becomes the Tujunga Wash, which runs south about 8.5 miles (13.7 km) to the Los Angeles River near Studio City.

== History ==
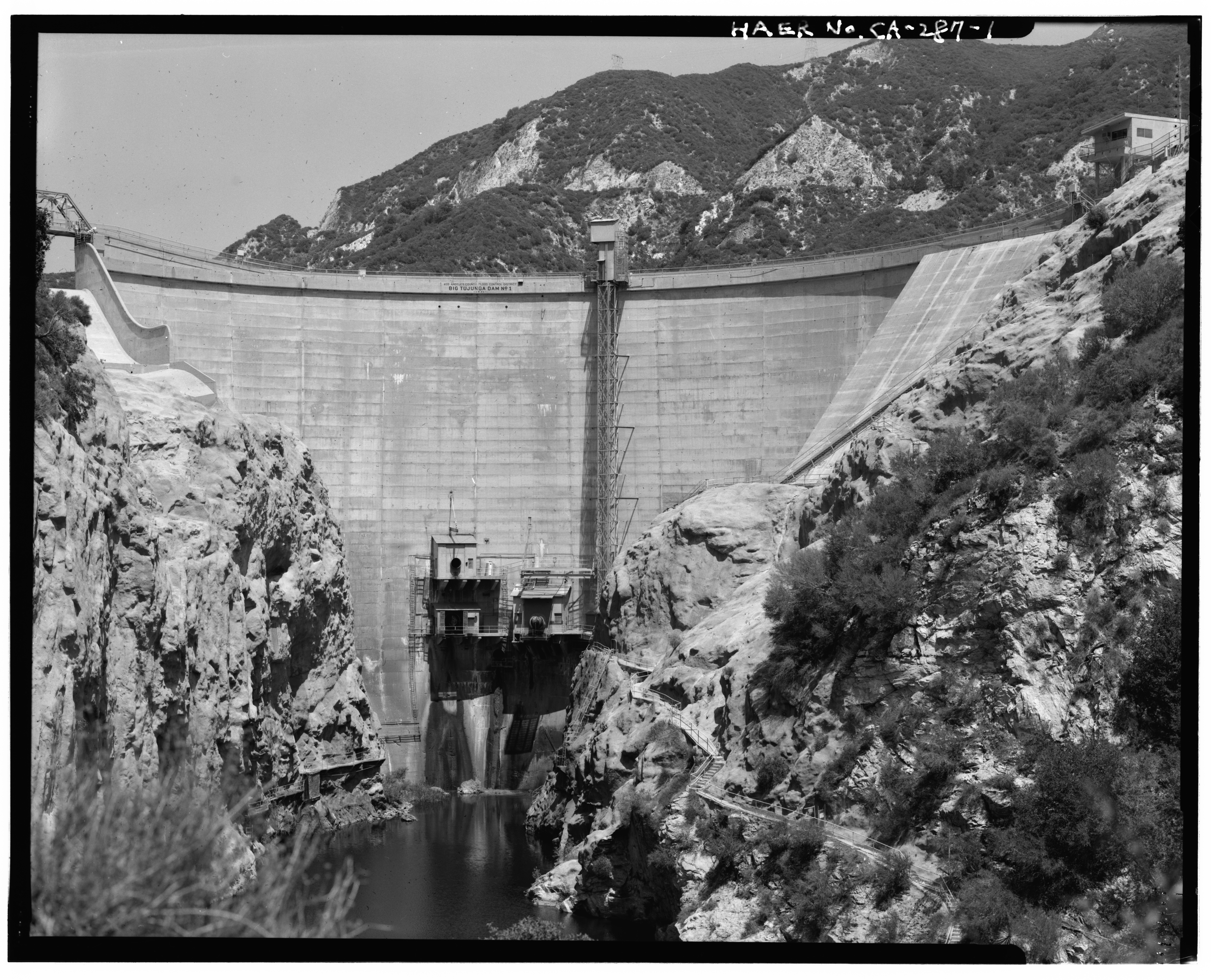
Big Tujunga Dam, downstream elevation view. It was built as part of a flood control and water conservation program in Los Angeles County to protect the growing community and provide water as demand increased.

The stream was named after the village of Tujunga or Tuxunga, a name which means "old woman's place" in both the languages of the Tongva and Fernandeño. The term is thought to relate to an ethnohistoric narrative, known as Khra'wiyawi, collected by Carobeth Laird from Juan and Juana Menendez at the Leonis Adobe in 1916. In the narrative, the wife of Khra'wiyawi (the chief of the region) is stricken with grief over the untimely loss of her daughter. In her sadness, she retreats to the mountains and turns to stone. It is thought this event became the basis for the village name. In fact, there is a large rock in Little Tujunga Canyon which looks like an old woman in a sitting position, whence the name originated. However, there was also a Fernandeño village in the vicinity of Big Tujunga Canyon (the upper part of the creek) called Muxúnga, which means "place of shooting" in the Fernandeño dialect of the Tongva language. The name comes from the verb muxú, which means "shoot him."

In 1931, the Big Tujunga Dam was built by the Los Angeles Department of Water and Power deep within the creek's canyon to provide flood control and block silt. With a capacity of just 5,960 acre-feet (7,350,000 m^{3}), the dam is unable to control large floods, and has overflowed many times since its construction. During the Los Angeles Flood of 1938, Big Tujunga Creek reached a maximum flow of more than 50,000 cubic feet per second (1,400 m^{3}/s), washing down thousands of tons of silt from the mountains and jumping its banks destroying hundreds of buildings and floodworks. Following the floods, the 97-foot (30 m)-high Hansen Dam was built across the lower creek by the U.S. Army Corps of Engineers in 1940 in the hope of controlling future floods.

== See also ==
- List of rivers of California
