= KHWG =

KHWG may refer to:

- KHWG (AM), a defunct radio station (750 AM) licensed to Fallon, Nevada, United States that was deleted in 2016
- KHWG-FM, a radio station (100.1 FM) licensed to Crystal, Nevada, United States
