= Shadow Hills, Los Angeles =

Shadow Hills
- Neighborhood of Los Angeles
- Location within Los Angeles/San Fernando Valley Shadow Hills (the Los Angeles metropolitan area)
- Coordinates: 34.26194°N 118.35083°W
- Country: United States
- State: California
- County: Los Angeles
- City: Los Angeles
- Time zone: UTC−8 (PST)
  - Summer (DST): UTC−7 (PDT)
- ZIP Code: 91040

Shadow Hills (originally Hansen Heights) is a neighborhood in the Verdugo Mountains and northeastern San Fernando Valley, within the city of Los Angeles, California.

== Geography ==
Shadow Hills is in the northwestern Verdugo Mountains, near the western end of the Crescenta Valley. It is north of the city of Burbank and southeast of the Hansen Dam Reservoir.

It is adjacent to the communities of Lake View Terrace to the north, Sunland and Tujunga to the east, Sun Valley to the south, and Pacoima to the west. The area is primarily equestrian zoned, one of the last remaining such neighborhoods within the City of Los Angeles.

Shadow Hills is an acceptable city name for ZIP Code 91040, with Sunland the default city name assigned to 91040.

== Demographics ==
As of the 2000 census, Shadow Hills had a population of 3,739 people. The racial breakdown was 79% Caucasian, 14% Latino, 3% Asian American, and 1% African American.

In 2009, the Los Angeles Times's "Mapping L.A." project supplied these Shadow Hills neighborhood statistics: population: 13,098; median household income: $82,796.

== History ==
The community began as Hansen Heights when it opened for a planned settlement at $150 an acre in 1907. Its first publicity was an article in The Los Angeles Record which announced a "public land meeting" in the Los Angeles Chamber of Commerce Building "with Stereoptican Pictures." Further promotional "illustrated lectures" about these "little farms" were held nightly.

In 1927, "Butterfly Gardens" was a six-acre plot "in the hills a little way off the main traveled road" owned by Mr. and Mrs. Albert Carter which were seeded to wildflowers in the expectation of attracting and "raising" butterflies. In the same year Frank Kenniston owned a grocery in Hansen Heights and also "one of the largest bee apiaries in this part of the country." Kenniston noted that Hansen Street was still unpaved and that owners of large tracts were unwilling to subdivide, "thus retarding development."

In 1946 the Shadow Hills Rodeo grounds were situated "on Wheatland Avenue in the Hansen Heights District of Roscoe," in a "beautiful setting with the green trees standing like guards." The arena was at 9951 Wheatland Avenue, a parcel that in 2021 was occupied by a six-bedroom, four-bath house.

During the area's development, some homes were built on hilltops, reachable only "by narrow roads chewed out of the hillsides." In 1948, Los Angeles City Building and Safety Chief G.E. Morris raised ire when he ordered the property owners on Johanna Street south of Sunland Boulevard to "vacate and demolish" any structure because the roads were so narrow they could not be reached by fire engines. Boyd assured a deputation of angry owners and their families who visited him at Los Angeles City Hall that he would seek a compromise which would not work "undue hardship." The area became known as "Dad's Canyon," which the city claimed was illegal because adequate police, fire, and sanitation could not be provided.

In 1966, the Valley Times reported that "The 'town' – such as it is – includes one market, a hitching post and a beauty parlor."

=== Renaming ===
Agitation to rename the area began in 1947 with a mass meeting in the Stonehurst School auditorium called by real estate broker John F. Willey "to discuss the possibility of securing a new post office and delivery district" for Shadow Hills. A second rally featured a song called "Shadow Hills" by Starr von Fluss.

Dorothy Neely, secretary-manager of the Roscoe Chamber of Commerce said that "Shadow Hills people don't like the name of Roscoe," they with others objecting to it as "unimaginative, not euphonious, and not descriptive of the location or the present-day development of the area."

The name change was approved by a vote taken among the four hundred members of the Hansen Heights Improvement Association, who also decided to change the name of their organization to Shadow Hills Civic Association. The officers were Stanley M. Love, president; Norwood Simmons, vice president; Mrs. Lee Payne, treasurer, and Ronald King, secretary.

Shadow Hills did not receive a new post office, but the local address for 1,500 residents was changed from Roscoe to Sunland for properties between Johanna Street and Stonehurst Avenue.

=== Freeway off-ramp ===
In the 1960s a section of the Foothill Freeway was mapped from Sunland southwest through Lakeview Terrace to Van Nuys Boulevard. The Shadow Hills Property Owners Association fought against the freeway mainly because its members, mostly horse enthusiasts, feared their rural environment would be spoiled, particularly if a freeway bridge were built over the Tujunga Wash.

== Education ==
=== Former ===
A Hansen Heights school district was formed in 1912, with M.W. Fuhrman as one of the trustees and E.D. Lamb as clerk.

=== Current ===
By 1931, Hansen Heights School had become a part of the Los Angeles City school system. In June of that year it was announced that Hansen Heights stood "highest of any high or elementary school in the city of Los Angeles in thrift" because every child "has an account in the school savings bank." Evangeline Hymer was the principal. The school, at 9900 Wheatland Avenue, was declared surplus in 1945 and the property put up for sale.

The Los Angeles Unified School District (LAUSD) serves Shadow Hills today. There are no LAUSD schools inside Shadow Hills itself. LAUSD students from Shadow Hills travel to the nearby Stonehurst Elementary School in Sun Valley, to Maclay Middle School in Pacoima, and to Verdugo Hills High School in Tujunga.

Village Christian School (VCS), a private K-12 school founded in 1949, is also located in the Sun Valley neighborhood, but Stonehurst Elementary School is closer to Shadow Hills than VCS is.

=== Attendance boundary, 1966 ===
A 1966 plan to require Shadow Hills students to switch from the overcrowded and virtually all-white Mount Gleason Junior High School in Sunland to the more diversified Maclay Junior High in Pacoima was opposed by the Shadow Hills Homeowners Association. The Los Angeles school board approved the boundary switch in a 4–3 vote on July 14, 1966.

== Government ==
=== Representation ===
Shadow Hills is represented by:

- Los Angeles City Council District 7, Council Member Monica Rodriguez.
- Los Angeles County Board of Supervisors District 5, Supervisor Kathryn Barger
- California State Senate District 25, Sasha Renée Pérez
- California State Assembly District 44, Nick Schultz
- United States House of Representative District 30, Laura Friedman

=== Public safety ===
- Los Angeles Fire Department Station 24 (Sunland/Shadow Hills) is in the area.
- Los Angeles Fire Department Station 77 (Sun Valley/Shadow Hills/La Tuna Canyon) is in the area.
- Shadow Hills is served by the Los Angeles Police Department Foothill Community Police Station.

== Notable residents ==
- Delaney Bramlett, singer and guitarist
- Ken Osmond, child actor
- Mark Salling, actor and musician
- Hervé Villechaize, actor and painter
- Tyrus Wong, artist
- Paul Walker, actor
