= KHWK =

KHWK may refer to:

- KHWK (AM), a radio station (1380 AM) licensed to serve Winona, Minnesota, United States
- KWMN, a radio station (99.3 FM) licensed to serve Rushford, Minnesota, which held the call sign KHWK-FM from 2019 to 2021
- KHWK (Nevada), a defunct radio station (92.7 FM) formerly licensed to serve Tonopah, Nevada, United States
