= Alder Creek (Los Angeles County, California) =

Stream in Los Angeles County, California, US

- Location of Alder Creek in California

Location
- Country: United States
- State: California

Physical characteristics
- Source: San Gabriel Mountains
  - location: Angeles National Forest
  - coordinates: 34°21′06″N 118°03′00″W
  - elevation: 4,382 ft (1,336 m)
- Mouth: Big Tujunga Creek
  - coordinates: 34°18′27″N 118°04′28″W
  - elevation: 3,396 ft (1,035 m)
- Length: 4.25 mi (6.84 km)

Alder Creek is an approximately 4.25-mile (6.84 km) long tributary of Big Tujunga Creek in Los Angeles County, California and the Angeles National Forest. It is formed by the confluence of the West Fork and North Fork Alder Creek in the San Gabriel Mountains a short distance south of Pacifico Mountain. It then flows south, picking up the Middle Fork, East Fork and Mule Fork before emptying into Big Tujunga Creek 5 miles (8.0 km) east of Hidden Springs. Near its mouth the creek flows under a bridge carrying Upper Big Tujunga Canyon Road.

== See also ==
- List of rivers of California
