= Mill Creek (Los Angeles County, California) =

Stream in Los Angeles County, California, USA

- Location of Mill Creek in California

Location
- Country: United States
- State: California

Physical characteristics
- Source: San Gabriel Mountains
  - location: Angeles National Forest
  - coordinates: 34°23′49″N 118°05′13″W
  - elevation: 5,171 ft (1,576 m)
- Mouth: Big Tujunga Creek
  - location: Near Hidden Springs
  - coordinates: 34°18′33″N 118°08′35″W
  - elevation: 2,661 ft (811 m)
- Length: 8 mi (13 km)

Mill Creek is a mountain stream in the Angeles National Forest of Los Angeles County, California, and a major tributary of Big Tujunga Creek. It flows in a southwesterly direction for about 8 miles (13 km) from near Mill Creek Summit in the San Gabriel Mountains to join Big Tujunga Creek near the village of Hidden Springs. The Mill Creek valley provides a major part of the route of Angeles Forest Highway (County Road N3). Mill Creek Summit, 4,910 feet (1,500 m), is the highest point along the road.

The named tributaries of Mill Creek, from upstream to downstream, are Monte Cristo Creek, Middle Fork Mill Creek, and North Fork Mill Creek.

== See also ==
- List of rivers of California
