= KHWK (Nevada) =

Radio station in Tonopah, Nevada, United States (1983–2013)

Tonopah, Nevada; United States
- Frequency: 92.7 MHz
- Branding: The Mighty Hawk

Programming
- Format: Defunct (formerly adult contemporary)
- Affiliations: Dial Global

Ownership
- Owner: Donald W. Kaminski, Jr.

History
- Former call signs: KPAH (1981–1995)

Technical information
- Licensing authority: FCC
- Facility ID: 17239
- Class: A
- ERP: 290 watts
- HAAT: 296 meters (971 ft)
- Transmitter coordinates: 38°04′22″N 117°13′16″W

Links
- Public license information: Public file; LMS

KHWK (92.7 FM) was a radio station licensed to Tonopah, Nevada, carrying an adult contemporary format. The call sign KHWK was assigned to the radio station in January 1995.

== Ownership ==
The station was owned by Donald W. Kaminski, Jr. and aired the Dial Global adult contemporary format.

The station was optioned in October 2007 by Mr. Kaminski to be acquired by Radio Tonopah, LLC, a wholly owned subsidiary of Legacy Communications Corporation. Legacy Communications Corporation is a publicly traded company. Legacy also owns nine other AM and FM radio stations in Utah, Idaho, Nevada, and California.

There was also an attempt to sell the station in 2005 to Keilly Miller, owner of KHWG in Fallon, Nevada, but that deal was never consummated because a license renewal was not granted and was still pending due to some ownership issues with the translators that KHWK is rebroadcast on.

The option to buy KHWK by Radio Tonopah was never exercised by Legacy Communications/Morgan Skinner.

Included in the option were the following translators:

Call sign	Frequency	City of license	FID	ERP (W)	Class	FCC info
K228CL	(93.5 FM) FM	Beatty, Nevada		80	D	
K232BM	(94.3 FM) FM	Lida, Nevada		80	D	
K285BU	(104.9 FM) FM	Round Mountain, Nevada		5	D	
K288CU	(105.5 FM) FM	Hawthorne, Nevada		53	D	

The station and translators failed to file for required license renewals by the June 1, 2013, deadline — as a result, the station's license expired, as did those of the translators, and all of the call signs were deleted from the Federal Communications Commission's database on October 1, 2013.
