= Sun Valley, Los Angeles =

Sun Valley
- Neighborhood of Los Angeles
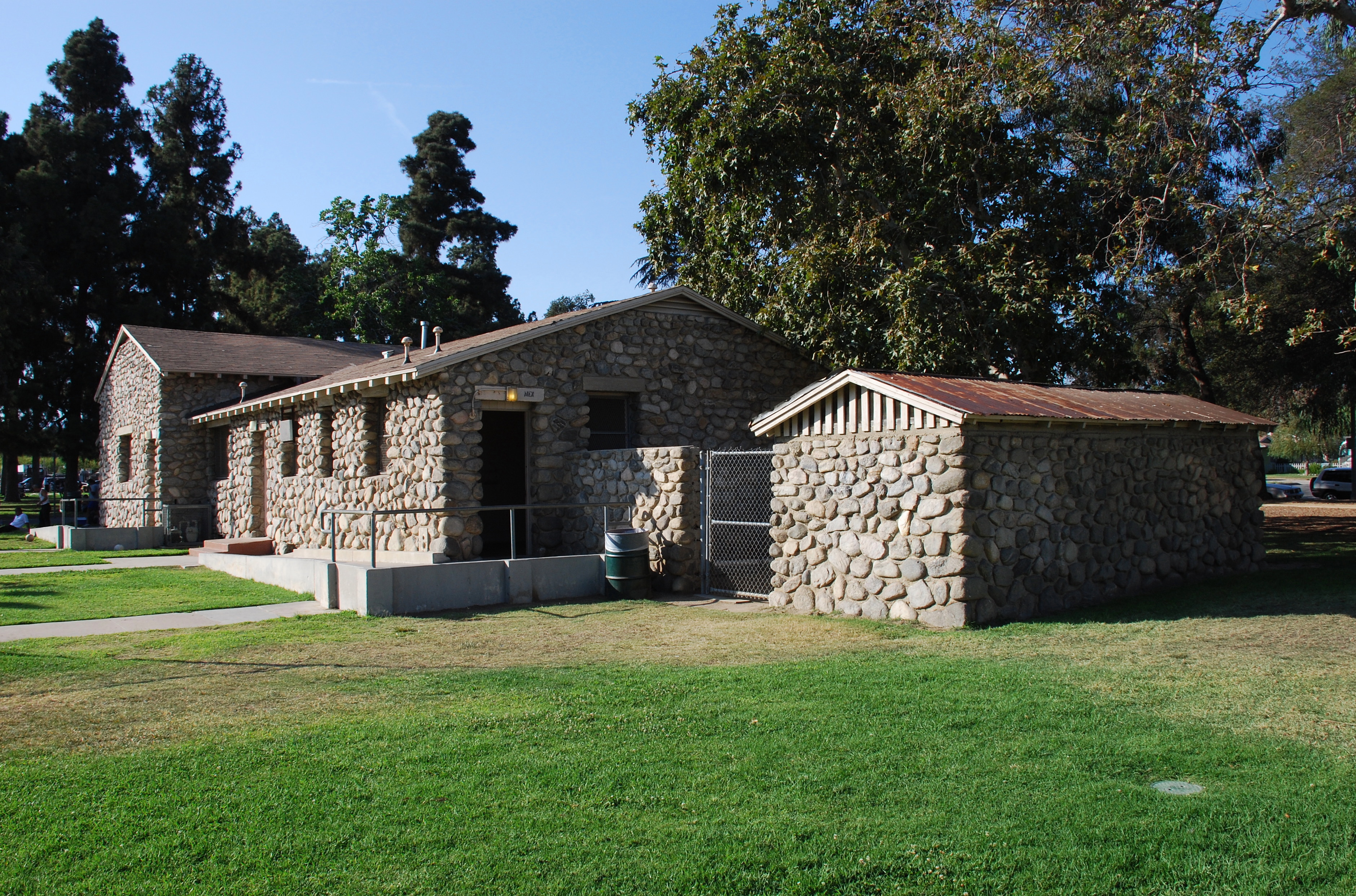
- Stonehurst Recreation Center building, 2008

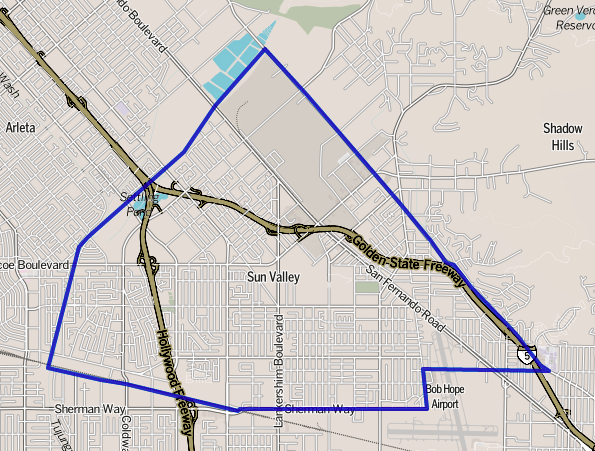
- Sun Valley. as delineated by the Los Angeles Times

- Location within Los Angeles and the San Fernando Valley Sun Valley (the Los Angeles metropolitan area)
- Coordinates: 34°13′03″N 118°22′10″W
- Country: United States
- State: California
- County: Los Angeles
- City: Los Angeles

Population (2008)
  - Total: 81,788

Sun Valley is a neighborhood in Los Angeles, California in the San Fernando Valley region. The neighborhood is known for its younger population. There are three recreation centers in Sun Valley, one of which is a historic site. The neighborhood has thirteen public schools—including John H. Francis Polytechnic High School and Valley Oaks Center for Enriched Studies (VOCES)—and four private schools.

== History ==
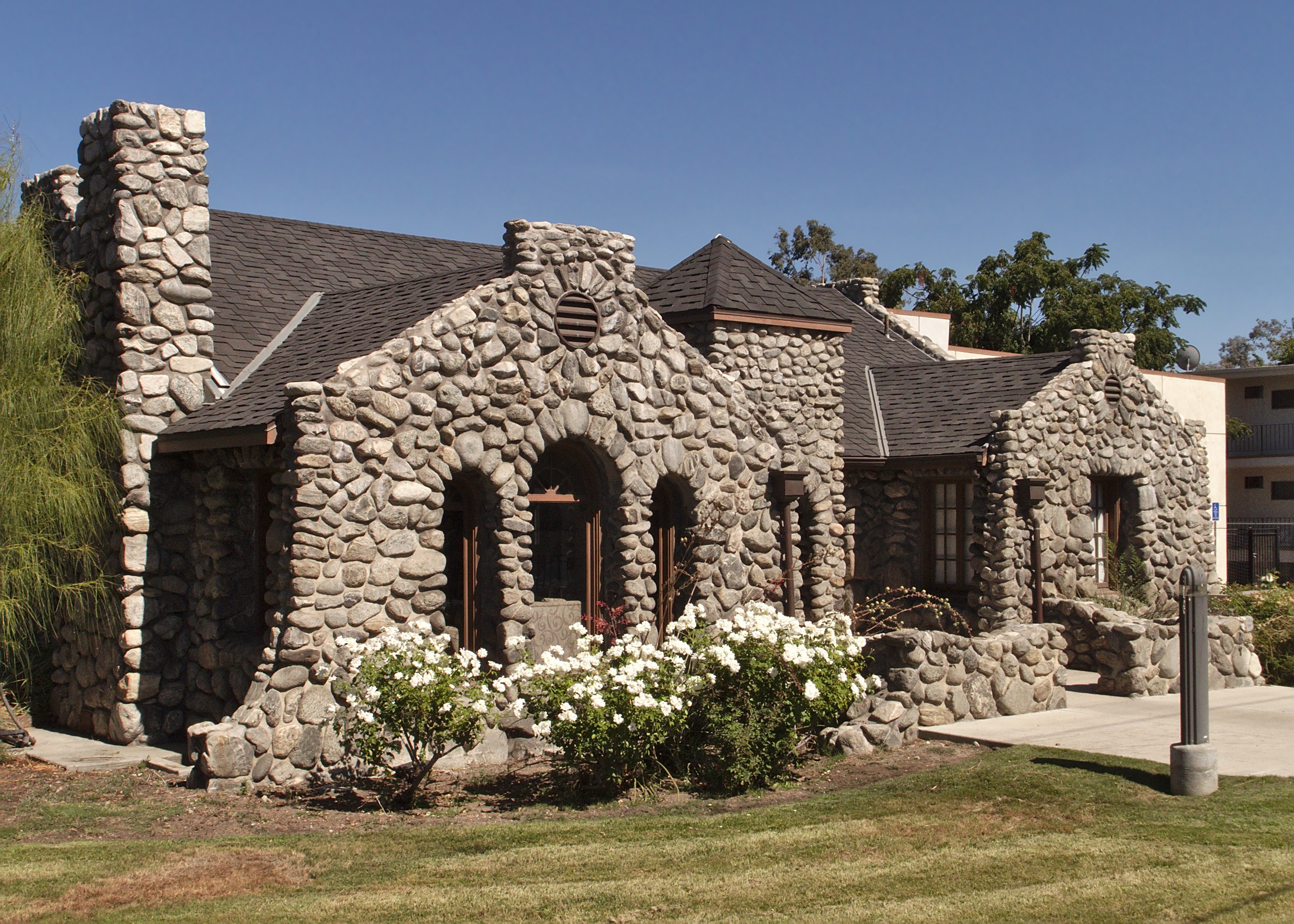
Stone house built in 1925

The former Tongva/Fernandeño (Native American) village in this area was called Wixánga, which comes from the word wixár (or "thorn" or "prickle" in English) in the Fernandeño dialect of the Tongva language. Hence, Wixánga meant something like "place/canyon of the thorns" in English, in reference to the abundant prickly pear cacti naturally found in the area. This was later reflected in the Spanish name for the area, or Cañada de las Tunas ("canyon of the thorns" in English). Finally, this became La Tuna Canyon, and now Sun Valley.

In 1874, California State Senator Charles Maclay (for whom Maclay Street in San Fernando is named) acquired 56,000 acres (230 km^{2}) of land across the San Fernando Valley. The area extended from Sunland Blvd. all the way west to the Chatsworth Hills. East of Sunland was Rancho San Rafael, a large land grant to José María Verdugo by the Spanish Crown.

By 1876, the Southern Pacific Railroad was constructed through the eastern San Fernando Valley, linking Southern and Northern California. A general store named Roberts Store was used as a post office and water-tank station; later the area's name was changed to Roscoe, reportedly after the name of a railroad crew member.

In the 1920s, development began on the Fernangeles tract (a blend of San Fernando and Los Angeles), with movie producer Cecil B. DeMille among the developers. The current name of Sun Valley was chosen in 1950 by residents.

== Geography ==
Sun Valley is bordered on the northeast by Shadow Hills, on the southeast by Burbank, on the south by North Hollywood and Valley Glen, on the west by Panorama City and on the northwest by Pacoima, Hansen Dam and Lake View Terrace.

Situated at the base of the Verdugo Mountains, Sun Valley is prone to flash floods, and one such flood on Sunday, February 20, 2005 at 22:37 (10:37 p.m. PST) destroyed a portion of the 8000 block of Tujunga Avenue and killed a Los Angeles City civil engineer when a sinkhole 30 feet (9.1 m) deep opened.

== Demographics ==
The 2000 U.S. census counted 75,848 residents in the 9.42-square-mile Sun Valley neighborhood—or 8,048 people per square mile, about an average population density for the city. In 2008, the city estimated that the population had increased to 81,788. In 2000 the median age for residents was 28, considered young for city and county neighborhoods; the percentage of residents aged 10 or younger was among the county's highest.

The neighborhood was considered "moderately diverse" ethnically within Los Angeles, with a high percentage of Latinos. The breakdown was Latinos, 69.4%; whites, 17.9%; Asians, 8.1%; blacks, 1.9%; and others, 2.7%. Mexico (54.5%) and El Salvador (11.9%) were the most common places of birth for the 51.9% of the residents who were born abroad—a high percentage for Los Angeles.

The median yearly household income in 2008 dollars was $51,290, considered average for the city but low for the county. The percentages of households that earned $20,000 to $60,000 were high for the county. Renters occupied 46.1% of the housing stock, and house or apartment-owners held 53.9%.

== Arts and culture ==
Old Trapper's Lodge
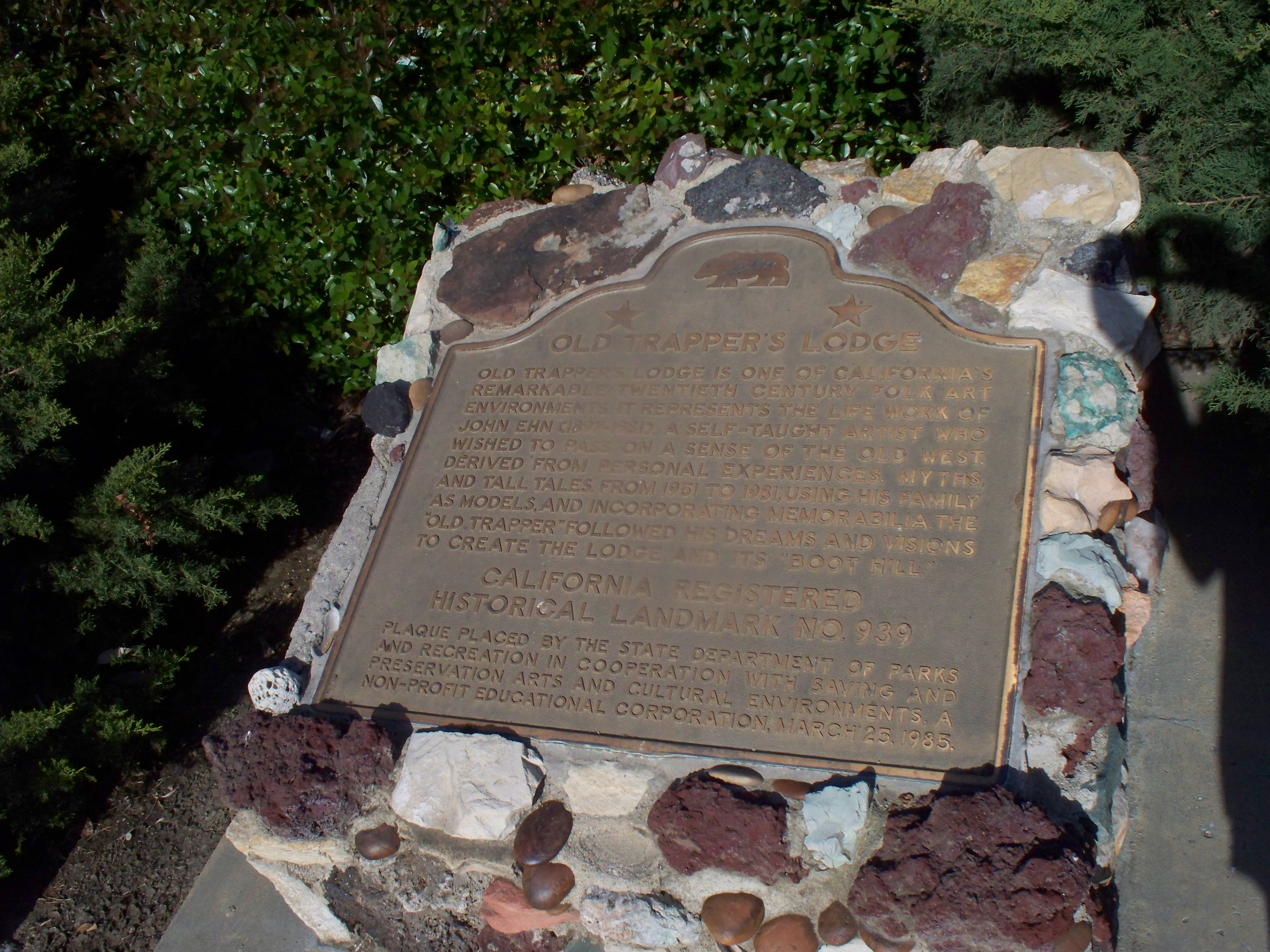
- Interactive map of Old Trapper's Lodge
- Location: Woodland Hills, Los Angeles

History
- Built: 1951 to 1981

Site notes
- Architect: John Ehn

California Historical Landmark
- Reference no.: 939

Old Trapper's Lodge, California Historical Landmark No. 939, an outsider art environment that pays homage to the pioneer upbringing of its creator, John Ehn (1897–1981), was situated in Sun Valley. It represented the life work of the self-taught artist who wished to pass on a sense of the Old West, derived from personal experiences, myths, and tall tales. From 1951 to 1981, using his family as models, and incorporating memorabilia, he followed his dreams and visions to create the lodge and its "Boot Hill." The artwork was moved from the original site in Sun Valley, CA, and relocated to Pierce College in Woodland Hills.

The Theodore Payne Foundation for Wild Flowers and Native Plants is located in Sun Valley; it is dedicated to helping people discover the beauty of California native plants.

== Parks and recreation ==
The Sun Valley Recreation Center in Sun Valley includes a public swimming pool, lighted baseball diamond, lighted outdoor basketball courts, a children's play area, a football field, picnic tables, a lighted soccer field, lighted tennis courts, and a lighted volleyball court.

The Fernangeles Recreation Center in Sun Valley includes a public swimming pool, an auditorium, barbecue pits, a lighted baseball diamond, lighted indoor basketball courts, lighted outdoor basketball courts, a children's play area, a lighted football field, an indoor gymnasium with weights, picnic tables, and a lighted soccer field.

The Stonehurst Recreation Center in Sun Valley is a historic site. The center has an indoor gymnasium and auditorium with a capacity of 400 people, barbecue pits, a lighted baseball diamond, lighted outdoor basketball courts, a children's play area, a community room, a lighted football field, an indoor gymnasium with weights, picnic tables, a lighted soccer field, and volleyball courts.

== Government and infrastructure ==
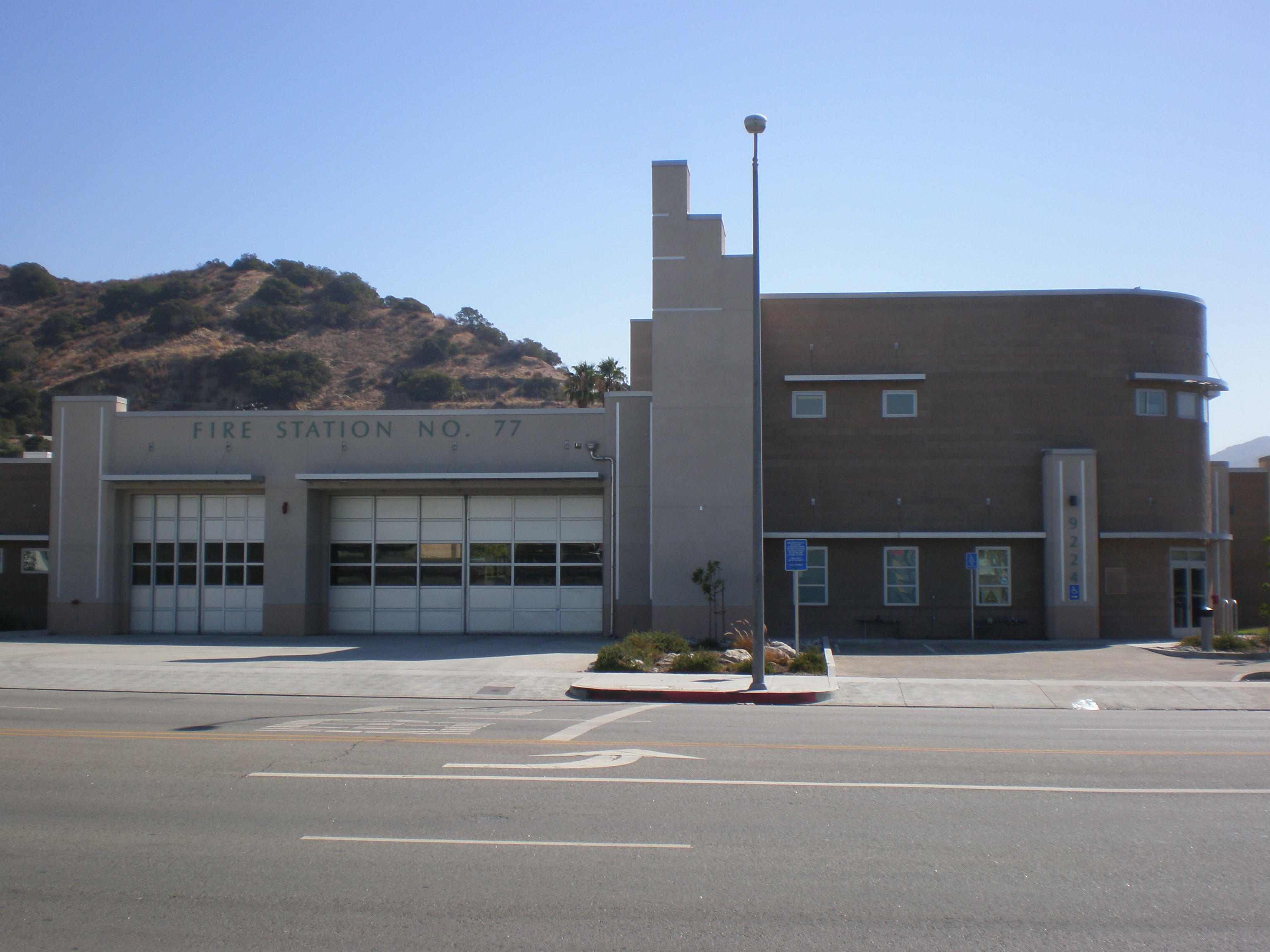
LAFD Fire Station # 77

Sun Valley is part of the City of Los Angeles. Los Angeles Fire Department Fire Station 77 is located in the Sun Valley area. The station is in the Battalion 12 district.

The United States Postal Service Sun Valley Post Office is located at 10946 Ratner Street.

== Education ==
One of every ten of Sun Valley residents aged 25 and older had earned a four-year degree by 2000, a low percentage for both the city and the county. The percentage of the same-age residents with less than a high school diploma was high for the county.

Schools within the Sun Valley boundaries are:

=== Public ===
- John H. Francis Polytechnic High School, 12431 Roscoe Boulevard
- Valley Oaks Center for Enriched Studies Magnet, 9171 Telfair Avenue
- Fernangeles Elementary School, 12001 Art Street
- Robert H. Lewis Continuation school, 12508 Wicks Street
- Richard E. Byrd Middle School, 8501 Arleta Avenue
- Arminta Street Elementary School, 11530 Strathern Street
- Strathern Street Elementary School, 7939 St. Clair Avenue
- Saticoy Elementary School, 7850 Ethel Avenue
- Glenwood Elementary School, 8001 Ledge Avenue
- Roscoe Elementary School, 10765 Strathern Street
- Vinedale Elementary School, 10150 La Tuna Canyon Road
- Charles Leroy Lowman Special Education Center, 12827 Saticoy Street
- Camelia Avenue Elementary School, 7451 Camelia Avenue
- Sun Valley Magnet School, 7330 Bakman Avenue
- Alliance Marine Innovation 6-12 Complex, 11933 Allegheny Street
- East Valley Skill Center (Adult School), 8601 Arleta Avenue
- Fenton Leadership Academy, 8926 Sunland Boulevard (K-2)
- Fenton STEM Academy, 8926 Sunland Boulevard (3-5)

=== University ===
- The Master's Seminary, 13248 Roscoe Boulevard

=== Public libraries ===
The Los Angeles Public Library operates the Sun Valley Branch.

== Notable people ==
- Michael Horse, actor (formerly Michael Heinrich)
- John F. MacArthur, American pastor and author
- Amber Rayne, American pornographic actor
