= Lake View Terrace, Los Angeles =

Lake View Terrace
- Neighborhood of Los Angeles
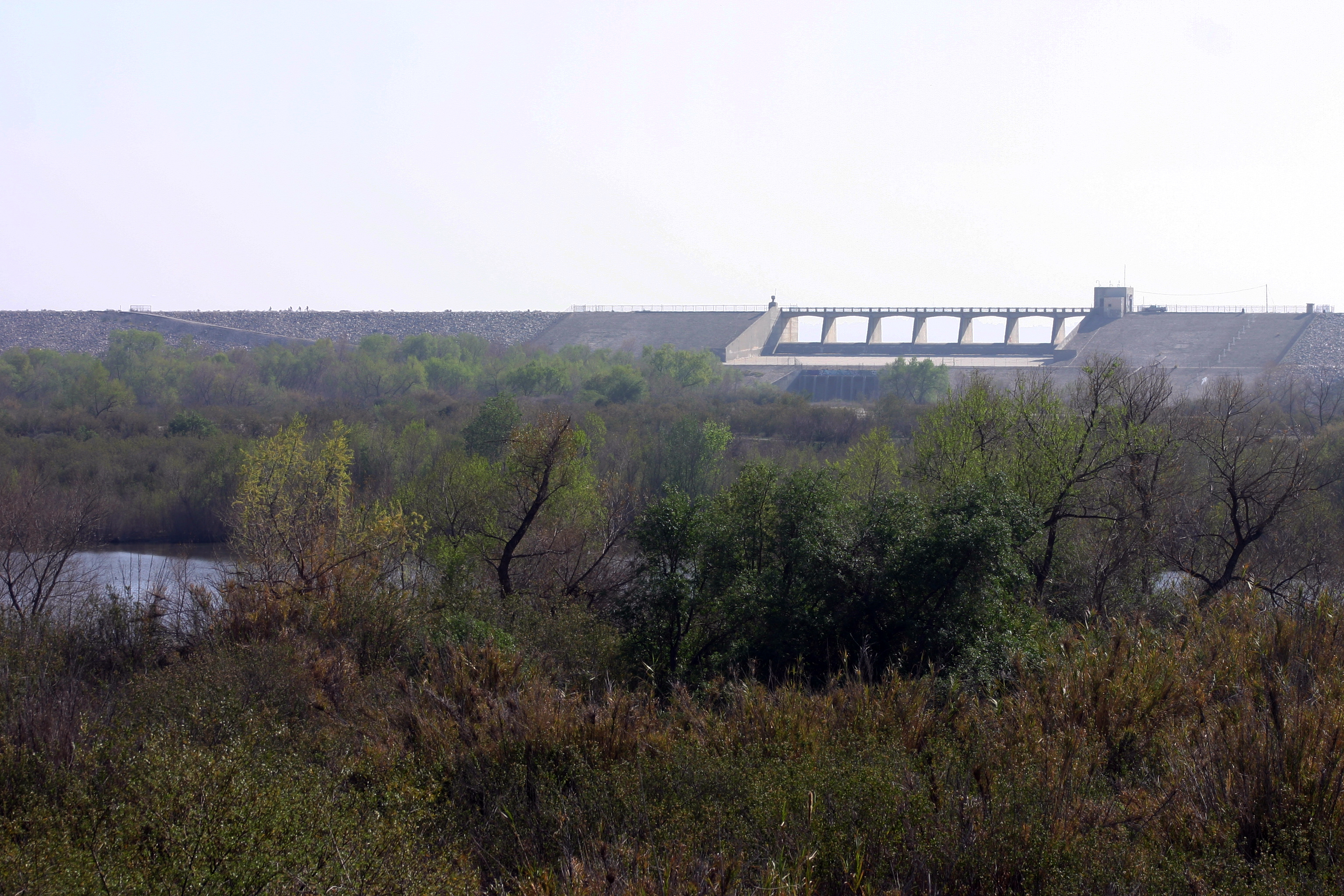
- Hansen Dam

- Location within Los Angeles/San Fernando Valley Lake View Terrace (the Los Angeles metropolitan area)
- Coordinates: 34.27639°N 118.36028°W
- Country: United States
- State: California
- County: Los Angeles
- City: Los Angeles
- Time zone: UTC-8 (PST)
  - Summer (DST): UTC-7 (PDT)
- ZIP code: 91342

Lake View Terrace is a suburban neighborhood in the San Fernando Valley region of the City of Los Angeles, California.

Surrounding areas include the Angeles National Forest, Little Tujunga Canyon, Big Tujunga Canyon, Hansen Dam, Kagel Canyon, and a portion of the Verdugo Mountains. The community lies adjacent to the communities of Sylmar, San Fernando, Shadow Hills, Sunland, Sun Valley, and Pacoima. The area shares the 91342 ZIP code with Sylmar. Lake View Terrace is accessed by the Foothill Freeway (Interstate 210) and the major thoroughfares of which include, Foothill Boulevard, Glenoaks Boulevard, Van Nuys Boulevard and Osborne Street.

The community is middle-class and ethnically mixed, including Latinos, African Americans, Whites and Asians.

The area hosts a large equestrian community, and is one of the few remaining residential areas in the City of Los Angeles that has private homes zoned for horsekeeping.

== History ==
Lake View Terrace was a part of the Rancho Tujunga Mexican land grant community. Settlers in Rancho Tujunga sold firewood to residents of El Pueblo, a settlement that was in what is now Los Angeles. In the 1800s Homer and Marie Hansen established a horse ranch in the area. In 1939 the U.S. Army Corps of Engineers seized the horse ranch's land via eminent domain to build a dam due to occurrences of flooding in the northeast and southeast portions of the San Fernando Valley. The Hansen Dam was built in 1940. Alyson Pitarre of the Los Angeles Times said "legend has it that" the name of Lake View Terrace originated from Holiday Lake, a 150-acre (61 ha) lake that was once behind the dam and a popular vacation area in the 1950s; the lake since dried. The Rodney King incident occurred in Lake View Terrace in 1991; Pitarre said that Lake View Terrace "gained notoriety" because of the incident.

== Demographics ==
The Los Angeles Times's "Mapping L.A." project supplied these neighborhood statistics (as of 2008): population of 12,719 with a median household income of $67,985.

With 2,790 people per square mile, it is among the lowest densities for the city of Los Angeles and among the lowest densities for the county.

== Cityscape ==
Alyson Pitarre of the Los Angeles Times said that Lake View Terrace "is a quiet equestrian community with two distinct faces: town and country." She described the densely populated western side as an "urban" area "characterized by high-density housing and the occasional school." Pitarre said that the eastern side has "a rural feel, with homes zoned for horse-keeping and agriculture." Residents of western Lake View Terrace moved to preserve what Pitarre calls "their semirural lifestyle." The residents, led by the Tujunga Watershed Council, fought many battles to preserve the atmosphere of Lake View Terrace. In November 2003 the residents persuaded the Regional Water Quality Control Board to order the U.S. Army Corps of Engineers to remove construction debris from lakes in the Hansen Dam area. Houses in northeast Lake View Terrace are newer and more expensive. Fenton Grove, which was one of the few new neighborhoods in Lake View Terrace in 2005, is located on Fenton Avenue and has views of the San Gabriel Mountains described by Pitarre as "scenic." More established neighborhoods are located to the east. Omari Mark, a real estate agent, described Lake View Terrace as "a hidden area" that many people do not know about in a 2005 Los Angeles Times article. Mark said that houses in Lake View Terrace were less expensive than those in Sylmar and Tujunga because those two neighborhoods were more well known.

== Culture ==
Alyson Pitarre of the Los Angeles Times said that Lake View Terrace "maintains a laid-back, rural image." Carol Ford, who was the president of the Valley Horse Owners Association in 2005, said "If you don't like the smell of livestock, you shouldn't move here."

== Film and television ==
Lake View Terrace has been used in many films over the years.

Film

Easy Rider (1969), The Dark Side of Tomorrow (1970), Smokey and the Bandit (1977), V (1983), Sunset Strip (1985), Terminator 2: Judgment Day (1991), Little Rascals (1994), Herbie Fully Loaded (2005), Lakeview Terrace (2008), Hole (2010), Star Wars: The Mission (2017), L.A. Burning: The Riots 25 Years Later (2017)

TV

Dynasty, Falcon Crest, Sons of Anarchy, Euphoria

== Government and infrastructure ==
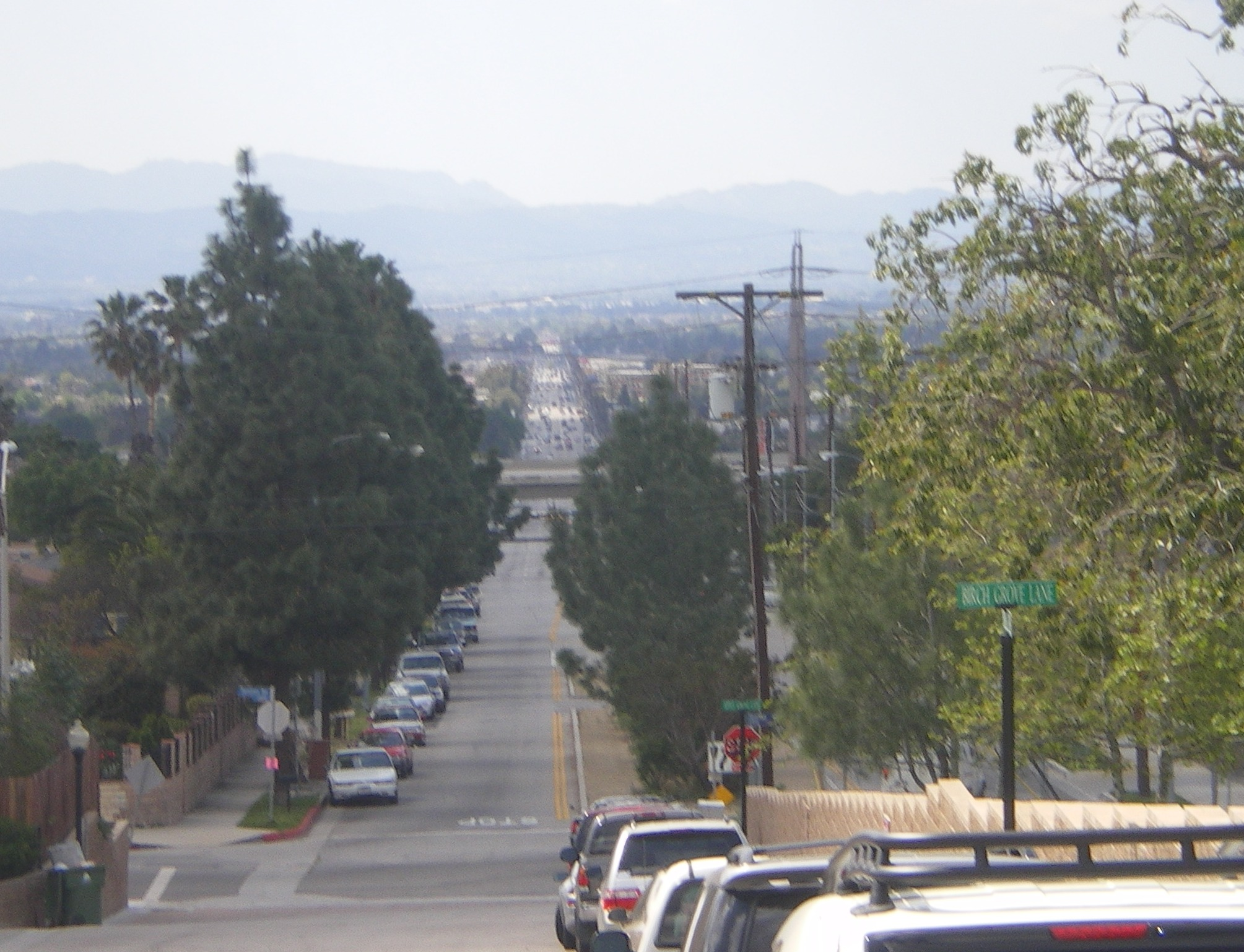
Van Nuys Boulevard Looking South from Lake View Terrace

Los Angeles Fire Department Station 24 Sunland/Shadow Hills, located in Sunland, serves Lake View Terrace. The Los Angeles Police Department Foothill Community Police Station in Pacoima serves Lake View Terrace.

== Education ==
=== Primary and secondary schools ===
==== Public schools ====
The Los Angeles Unified School District serves the community. Two elementary schools, Brainard Avenue Elementary School and Fenton Elementary School, are in the community. In 2005 residents were zoned to Olive Vista Middle School and Sylmar High School.

PUC Schools, a charter school operator, operates PUC Community Charter Middle School, PUC Lakeview Charter Academy, and PUC Community Charter Early College High School.

==== Private schools ====
Delphi Academy of Los Angeles, a Delphi Academy school, is in Lake View Terrace. The school was originally in La Cañada Flintridge; the current campus in Lake View Terrace opened in 2003.

=== Public libraries ===
Los Angeles Public Library operates the Lake View Terrace Branch Library.

=== Discovery Cube ===
On November 13, 2014, Discovery Cube Los Angeles opened its doors in the Hansen Dam Recreation Center. The children's science center has 71,000 square feet and is the first major museum in the San Fernando Valley.

== Parks and recreation ==
Alyson Pitarre of the Los Angeles Times said that Lake View Terrace "is a hub for outdoor recreation." The community has equestrian trails, two golf courses, hills, lakes, three parks, and two recreation centers.

The Lake View Terrace Recreation Center in Lake View Terrace includes barbecue pits, lighted outdoor basketball courts, children's play area, community room, indoor gymnasium, picnic tables, and lighted tennis courts. Several recreational facilities in the Hansen Dam area, including the Hansen Dam Equestrian Center, Hansen Dam Park/Recreation Area and the Hansen Dam Swim Lake Aquatic Center/Pool are in Lake View Terrace. The Hansen Dam Recreation Area, which also acts as a Los Angeles Police Department stop-in center, includes barbecue pits, an unlighted baseball diamond, children's play area, picnic tables, and an unlighted soccer field. The Hansen Dam Aquatic Center, a 40-acre (16 ha) recreational facility on the northwest side of the Hansen Dam Recreation Area, includes a 9-acre (3.6 ha) recreation lake used for fishing, pedal boat rental, and public boating. The center also includes a 1.5 acres (0.61 ha) swimming lake, 50 public restrooms, 25 showers, 20 dressing rooms, and several picnic areas. Users of the park may also jog, picnic, and take boating classes. During each weekend over the summer, the aquatic center received up to 2,000 visitors. Both the Lake View Terrace Recreation Center and Hansen Dam Recreation Center feature public equestrian facilities which residents and visitors can use.

== See also ==
- Lakeview Terrace, 2008 film
