= KHWG (AM) =

- Fallon, Nevada; United States
- Frequency: 750 kHz

Ownership
- Owner: Media Enterprises, LLC.

History
- First air date: June 2, 2005
- Last air date: January 1, 2015
- Call sign meaning: "Hog Country"

Technical information
- Facility ID: 135862
- Class: B
- Power: 10,000 watts (day); 250 watts (night)
- Transmitter coordinates: 39°26′21″N 118°46′47″W

KHWG (750 AM) was a radio station broadcasting a classic country format. Licensed to Fallon, Nevada, United States, the station was owned by Media Enterprises, LLC. This station operated at 750 kHz, with a power of 10,000 watts day and 250 watts night, both non-directional. KHWG's studio was located at 1050 West Williams Avenue (U.S. Route 50) in Fallon, with transmitter facilities at 3447 Veterans Memorial Highway on the outskirts of Fallon.

== History ==
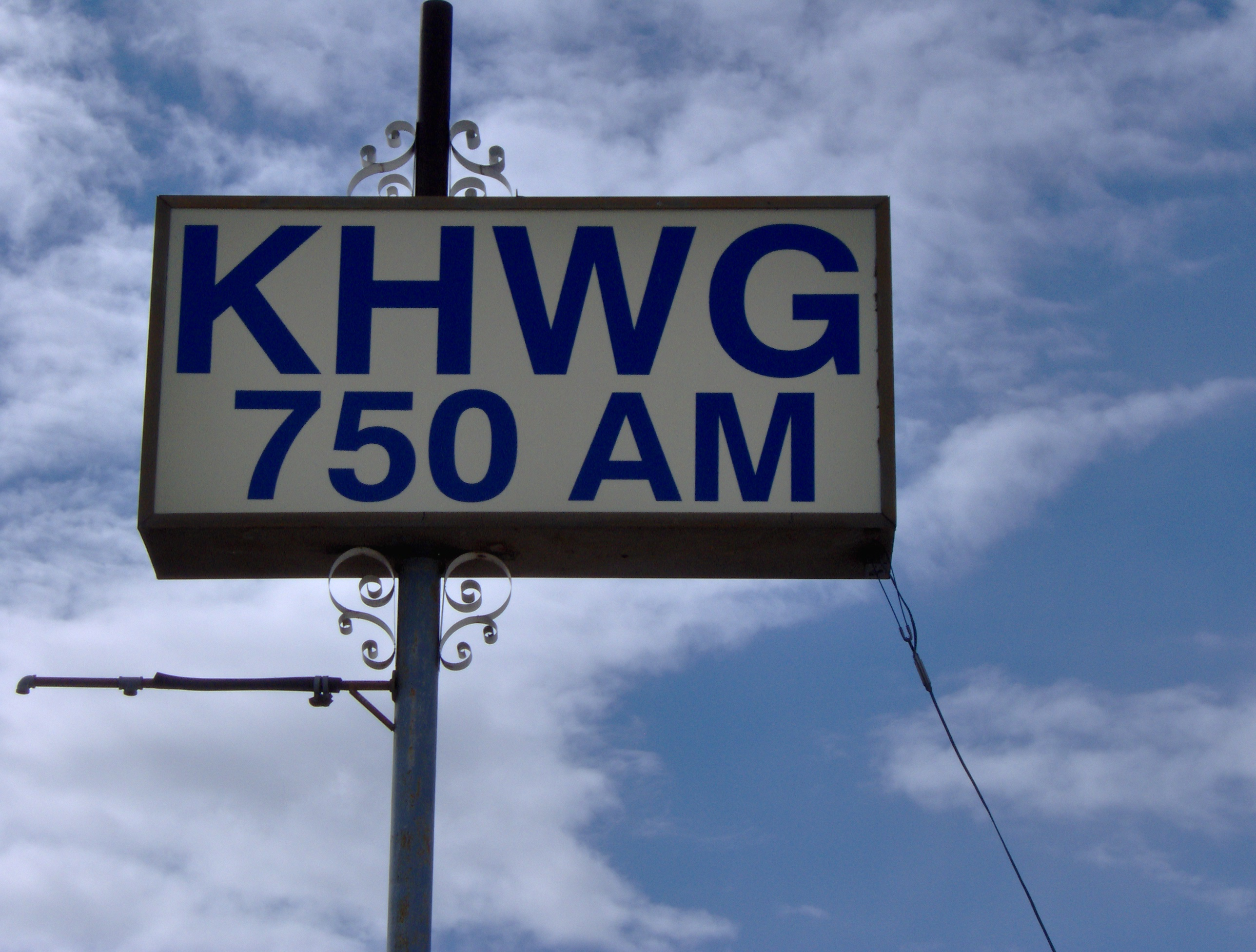
Signage in front of KHWG studio building along Route 95 in Fallon.

=== Beginnings in Carson City ===
The history of KHWG dates back to 1991, when Caballero Radio West purchased two construction permits for this station, then known as KKNK in Carson City, Nevada, and KKNC in Sun Valley, California, at a price of $37,500, according to the 1993 Broadcasting and Cable Yearbook. KKNK was granted a permit to operate at 10,000 watts unlimited time, with different directional antenna patterns for day and night.

=== Move to Fallon ===
KKNK never made to the air in Carson City. The construction permit for KHWG (not yet assigned call letters) later ended up in the hands of Kidd Communications, a company based in South Lake Tahoe, California, and headed by Chris Kidd, who at the time also owned KTHO in South Lake Tahoe. Kidd applied for the permit in May 2002. The construction permit was then transferred to another company owned by Chris Kidd, known as Eastern Sierra Broadcasting, and also located in South Lake Tahoe.

=== Litigation ===
The construction permit for KHWG was transferred again, this time from Chris Kidd to Keily Miller, owner of Pahrump, Nevada, television stations KPVT-LP and KHMP-LP, in settlement of a lawsuit between them, in December 2002, over the intended sale of the construction permit and its sale price. Miller at the time owned another radio station in Quincy, California bearing the call letters of KHWG. Both parties settled out of court on October 31, 2002, with Miller paying Kidd a total of $35,000 for the construction permit.

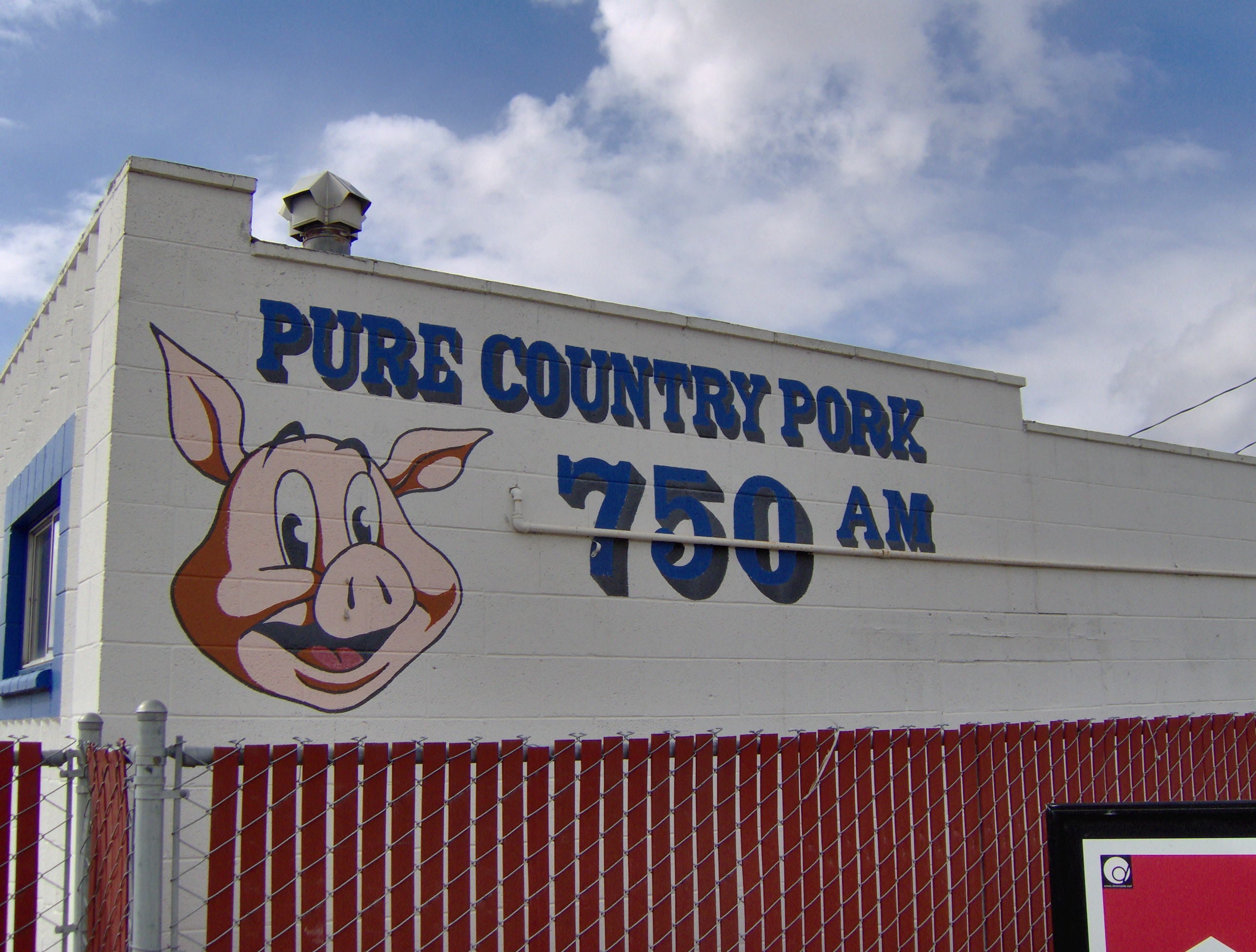
Signage on KHWG studio building along Route 95 in Fallon.

=== Sign-on and subsequent failure ===
KHWG was granted approval by the FCC to take its new call sign on October 1, 2003, later signing on at its assigned power. The call letters of Miller's KHWG in Quincy were retired and replaced with KHGQ.

Miller then set up Media Enterprises controlling KHWG. She transferred the license from herself (as an individual) to the new company in August 2005. In January 2006, Media Enterprises applied to the FCC for a daytime power increase to 10,000 watts.

KHWG went silent on January 1, 2015, citing "a lack of revenue". The station's license was canceled by the FCC on July 5, 2016, due to the length of time for which the station had been silent. As of 2018, the station's tower is still standing and its studio building with the station signage remain intact.
