= Tujunga Wash =

Stream in Los Angeles County, California, US

Coordinates: 34.1451°N 118.3889°W

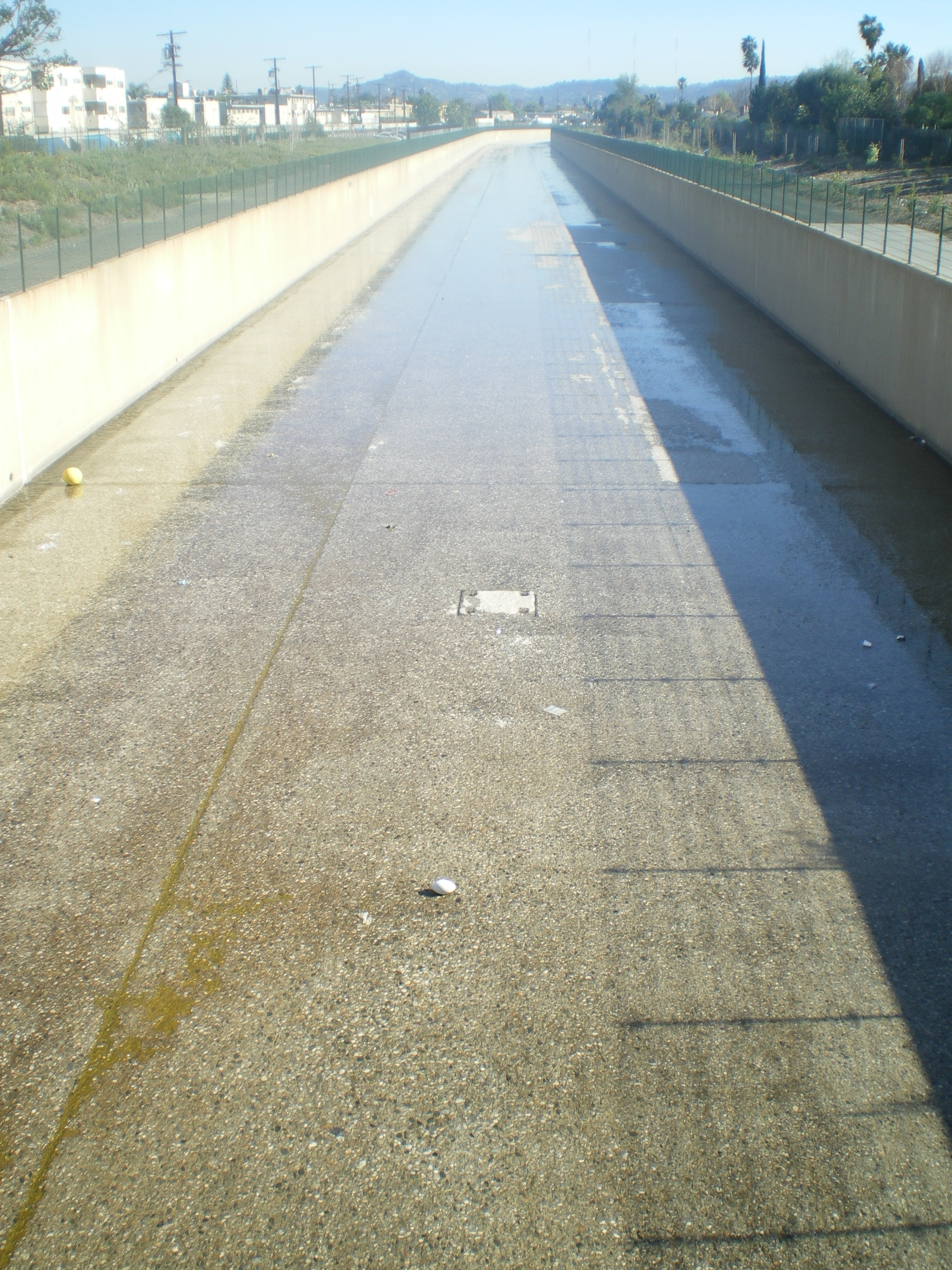
Tujunga Wash, south from Victory Boulevard

Tujunga Wash is a 13-mile-long (20.9 km) stream in Los Angeles County, California. It is a tributary of the Los Angeles River, providing about a fifth of its flow, and drains about 225 square miles (580 km^{2}). It is called a wash because it is usually dry, especially the lower reaches, only carrying significant flows during and after storms, which usually only occur between November and April. The name of the wash derives from a Tongva village name.

== About ==
The name Tujunga or Tuxunga means "old woman's place" in both Fernandeño and Tongva, where Tuxu means "old woman". The term is thought to relate to an ethnohistoric narrative, known as Khra'wiyawi, collected by Carobeth Laird from Juan and Juana Menendez at the Leonis Adobe in 1916. In the narrative, the wife of Khra'wiyawi (the chief of the region) is stricken with grief over the untimely loss of her daughter. In her sadness, she retreats to the mountains and turns to stone. It is thought this event became the basis for the village name. In fact, there is a large rock in Little Tujunga Canyon which looks like an old woman in a sitting position. However, there was also a Fernandeño village in the vicinity of Big Tujunga Canyon called Muxúnga, which means "place of shooting" in the Fernandeño dialect of the Tongva language. The name comes from the verb muxú, which means "shoot him."

Tujunga Wash consists of two forks, both beginning in the San Gabriel Mountains. The upper portion of Big Tujunga Wash is called Big Tujunga Creek. It travels roughly east to west, and several tributaries from the north and south join it as it flows to Big Tujunga Reservoir, formed by Big Tujunga Dam. Below the dam, the stream is called Big Tujunga Wash. It continues its westward flow, enters the San Fernando Valley and is met by Little Tujunga Wash a mile before reaching Hansen Reservoir, which is formed by Hansen Dam. Little Tujunga Wash comes from the north, draining the portion of the San Gabriel Mountains immediately north of Hansen Reservoir. Downstream of the dam, Tujunga Wash flows roughly south and is met halfway to its confluence with the Los Angeles River by Pacoima Wash, which drains the other side of the mountains that Little Tujunga Wash drains. Finally, Tujunga Wash meets the Los Angeles River in the Studio City neighborhood of Los Angeles.

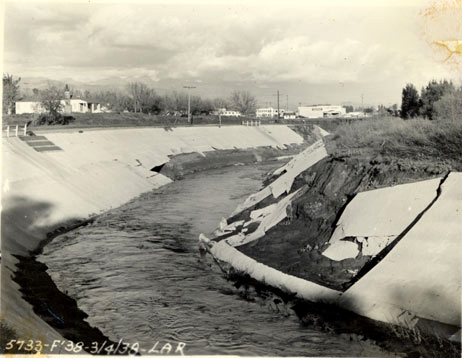
Flooding damage along the wash in 1938

The Big Tujunga Dam was constructed by Los Angeles County and completed in 1931. The resulting Big Tujunga Reservoir has a capacity of 5,960 acre-feet (7,350,000 m^{3}). Although the dam was tested during the Los Angeles Flood of 1938, it required a seismic retrofit to meet modern safety standards. Completed in July 2011, the retrofit included doubling the thickness of the gravity arch dam. Downstream, the United States Army Corps of Engineers completed the Hansen Dam in 1940, creating a reservoir capable of holding 74,100 acre-feet (91,400,000 m^{3}).

While the primary purpose of these facilities is flood control, they also facilitate groundwater recharge. However, the efficiency of natural recharge within the watershed is limited by geographical and urban factors. In the upper reaches, high flow velocities prevent significant soil absorption. In the lower watershed, extensive urbanization has replaced bare ground with concrete-lined channels, further inhibiting percolation and resulting in the majority of runoff discharging into the ocean.

In 1969, there was a flood in the Tujunga Wash. Water flowed down a formerly inactive channel and entered a large gravel pit 50 to 75 ft (15 to 23 m) deep. The channel bed degraded by about 12.5 feet (3.8 m), leading to the failure of three highway bridges and the loss of seven homes.

== Crossings ==
From north to south (with year built in parentheses):

- Hansen Dam (1940)
- Service bridge
- Glenoaks Boulevard (1953)
- Railroad
- San Fernando Road (1935)
- Laurel Canyon Boulevard (1952)
- Interstate 5 & California 170 (1963)
- Arleta Avenue (1968)
- Roscoe Boulevard (1956)
- Cantara Street (1952)
- Saticoy Street (1952)
- Railroad: Union Pacific Coast Line
- Sherman Way (1952)
- Vanowen Street & Fulton Avenue (1951)
- Ethel Avenue
- Victory Boulevard (1952)
- Oxnard Street (1952)
- Burbank Boulevard & Coldwater Canyon Avenue (1951)
- Chandler Boulevard North (1951)
- Metro G Line
- Chandler Boulevard South (1957)
- Magnolia Boulevard (1950)
- Riverside Drive & Whitsett Avenue (1950)
- U.S. Route 101 - Ventura Freeway (1959)
- Laurel Canyon Boulevard (1950)
- Moorpark Street (1951)
- Merges with Los Angeles River

== See also ==
- Tujunga Wash Greenway and Bike Path
- Great Wall of Los Angeles
