= Big Tujunga Dam =

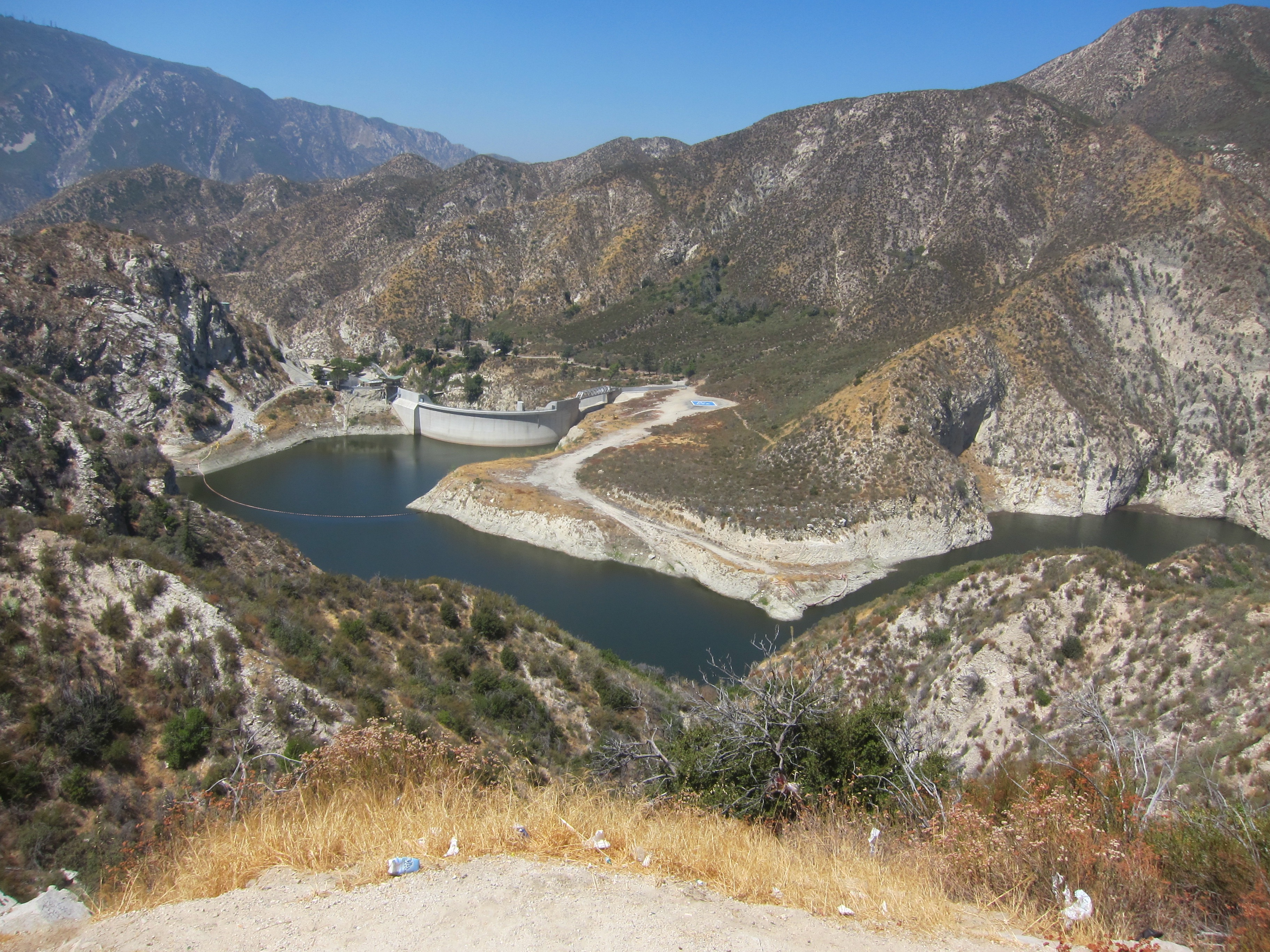
- View of the dam and reservoir from upstream
- Interactive map of Big Tujunga Dam
- Country: United States
- Location: Angeles National Forest, Los Angeles County, California
- Coordinates: 34°17′36″N 118°11′18″W
- Opening date: 1931; 95 years ago
- Owner: Los Angeles County Flood Control District

Dam and spillways
- Type of dam: Concrete arch
- Impounds: Big Tujunga Creek
- Height: 208 ft (63 m)
- Height (foundation): 244 ft (74 m)
- Length: 830 ft (250 m)
- Spillway type: Concrete-lined overflow
- Spillway capacity: 90,000 cu ft/s (2,500 m^{3}/s)

Reservoir
- Creates: Big Tujunga Reservoir
- Total capacity: 5,960 acre⋅ft (7,350,000 m^{3})
- Catchment area: 82 mi^{2} (210 km^{2})

Big Tujunga Dam is a 244-foot-high (74 m) concrete arch dam in Los Angeles County, California, spanning Big Tujunga Canyon northeast of Sunland, in the foothills of the San Gabriel Mountains. Completed in 1931, it provides flood control and groundwater recharge for the San Fernando Valley.

Its reservoir is called Big Tujunga Reservoir, and collects runoff from a watershed of 82 square miles (210 km^{2}). Although it is located inside the Angeles National Forest, public access to the lake is forbidden. The water is usually kept at a low level, in order to protect against winter floods. The name of the dam is derived from a Tongva village name.

== Description ==
The dam is 208 feet (63 m) high from the riverbed, 244 feet (74 m) high from the foundations, and 830 feet (250 m) long. It has a width of 138 feet (42 m) at the base, tapering to 8 feet (2.4 m) at the crest. The storage capacity is 5,960 acre⋅ft (7,350,000 m^{3}) at the spillway, with a minimum pool of 1,210 acre⋅ft (1,490,000 m^{3}) to prevent sediment and debris from entering the dam's outlets.

After the completion of Hansen Dam downstream, the importance of Big Tujunga Dam for flood control has decreased; however, it is still directly responsible for protecting about 4,600 residents living in the floodplain of Big Tujunga Canyon. In addition, the dam conserves about 4,500 acre⋅ft (5,600,000 m^{3}) of runoff per year for drinking water and groundwater recharge purposes. This saves the city of Los Angeles about $2,250,000 annually due to the cost difference between local and imported water.

Because of the small storage capacity of the reservoir relative to the size of its watershed, frequent dredging is required to remove sediment from behind the dam. Most of the sediment is compacted and stored at the Maple Canyon Sediment Placement Site located less than 1 mile (1.6 km) west of the dam. The 2009 Station Fire, which burned some 87% of the Big Tujunga watershed, caused more than 2 million cubic yards (1.5 million m^{3}) of sediment to flow into the reservoir, all of which subsequently had to be removed.

== History ==
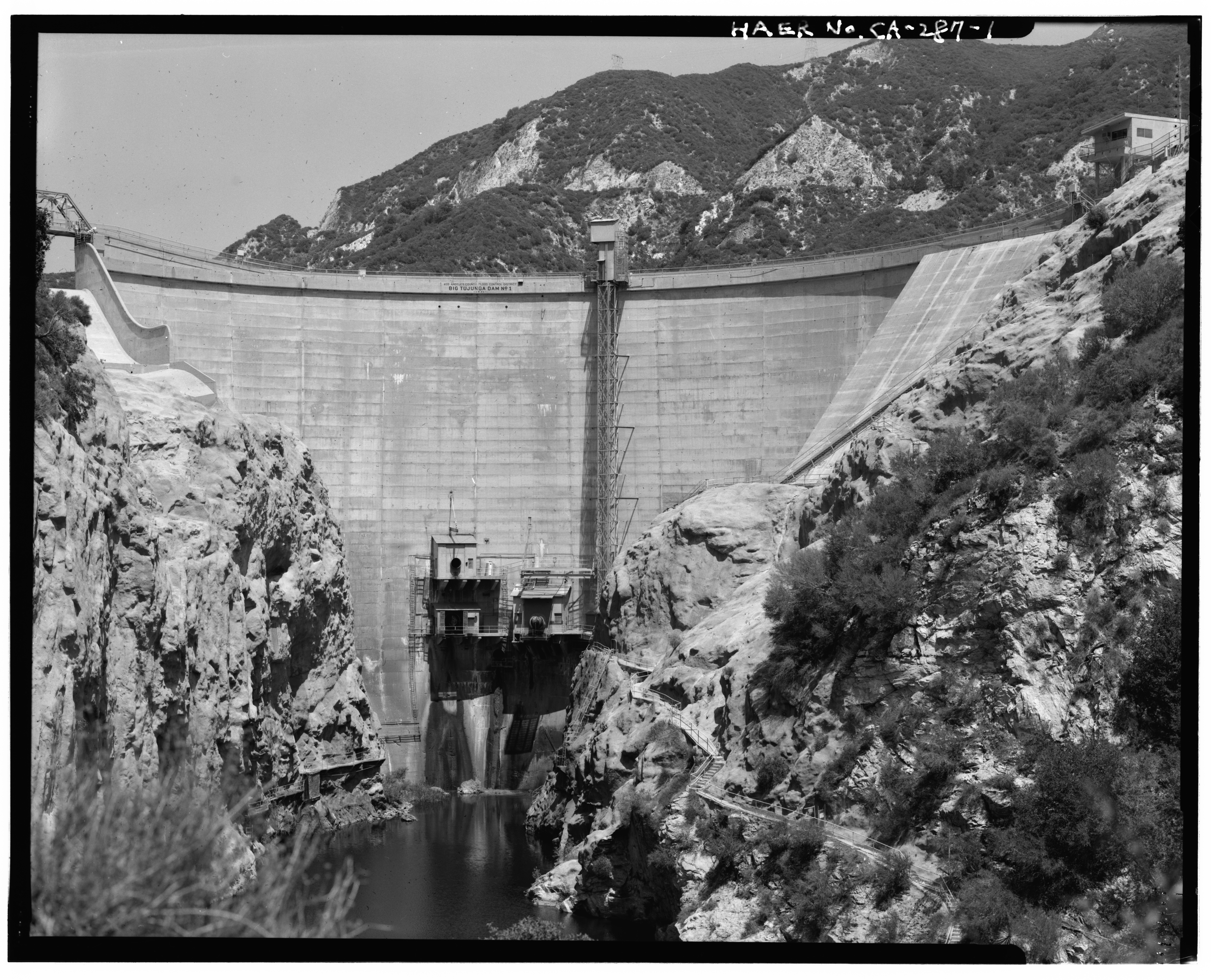
Big Tujunga Dam appearance before seismic retrofit

Aside from the village of Tujunga or Tuxunga (means "old woman's place" in both the languages of the Tongva and Fernandeño), the former Fernandeño (Native American) village in the area of the dam and Big Tujunga Canyon was called Muxúnga, which means "place of shooting" in the Fernandeño dialect of the Tongva language. The name comes from the verb muxú, which means "shoot him."

The dam was completed in 1931 by the Los Angeles County Flood Control District, at a cost of $1.2 million ($25.4 million in 2025 dollars). It was originally planned as one of several flood control dams inside Big Tujunga Canyon and was thus referred to as Big Tujunga Dam No. 1 until the larger Hansen Dam was completed in 1940 at the mouth of the canyon, eliminating the need for the other dams. During the Los Angeles flood of 1938, the dam was able to stop a huge debris flow of boulders and uprooted trees, sparing much of Sunland, Tujunga and Glendale from destruction.

In 1976, the dam was recognized as in danger of failure from earthquakes (the San Andreas Fault runs nearby) and the reservoir's level was temporarily restricted to about 25% of capacity. In 2008 the Los Angeles County Flood Control District began a project to rehabilitate the aging structure. Approximately 75,000 yd^{3} (57,000 m^{3}) of concrete was added to the dam, transforming it from a thin-arch to a thick-arch design. A new spillway was built and the original one was expanded, increasing the floodwater capacity from 23,000 cu ft/s (650 m^{3}/s) to more than 90,000 cu ft/s (2,500 m^{3}/s). In addition, a 24-inch (610 mm) valve was installed at the dam base to pass low flows for habitat conservation. The seismic retrofit project was completed in July 2011 at a cost of $100 million.

== See also ==
- List of lakes in California
- List of dams and reservoirs in California
