= Hansen Dam =

- Location within San Fernando Valley
- Country: United States
- Location: San Fernando Valley
- Coordinates: 34.26047°N 118.38556°W
- Purpose: Flood control
- Status: Operational
- Construction began: 1939; 87 years ago
- Opening date: 1940; 86 years ago
- Owners: U.S. Army Corps of Engineers, Los Angeles District

Dam and spillways
- Impounds: Tujunga Wash
- Height: 97 feet (30 m)
- Length: 2 miles (3.2 km)

Reservoir
- Total capacity: 74,100 acre⋅ft (91,400,000 m^{3})
- Website; Corps Lakes Gateway - Hansen Dam

Hansen Dam is a dam built for flood control in the northeastern San Fernando Valley, in the Lake View Terrace neighborhood of Los Angeles, California. The dam was built by the U.S. Army Corps of Engineers, Los Angeles District in 1940. Hansen Dam was named after horse ranchers Homer and Marie Hansen, who established a ranch in the 19th century.

The Hansen Dam Recreation Center is located in the flood control basin and surrounding slopes behind the dam.

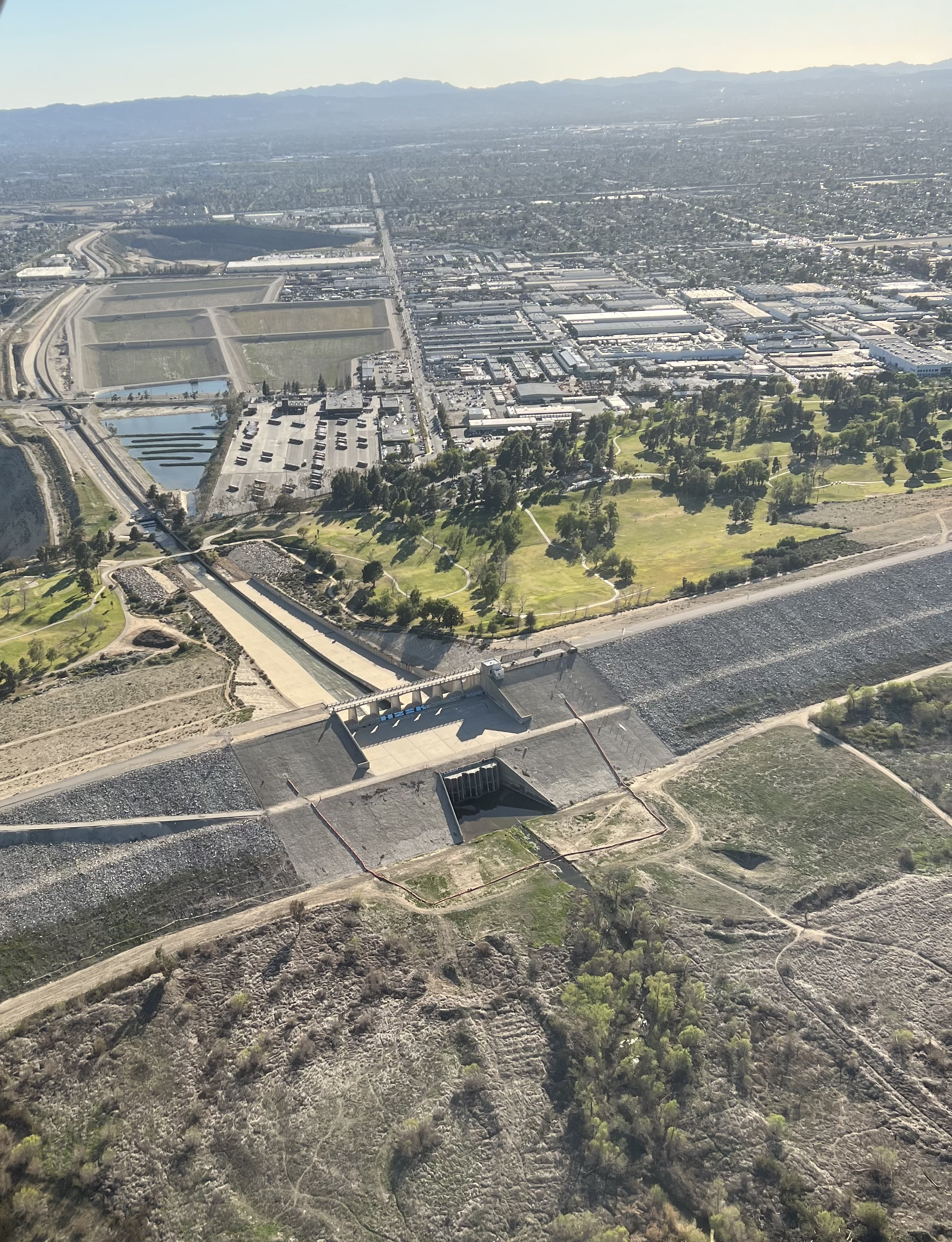
Aerial view of the Hansen Dam and Hansen Dam Golf Course (2022).

== Geography ==
Hansen Dam and its once-designed lake are now seasonal flood spreading grounds in the San Fernando Valley on Tujunga Wash. Tujunga Wash begins between the San Gabriel Mountains and Verdugo Mountains. The dam is 1 mile (1.6 km) downstream from the confluence of the Big Tujunga Creek and Little Tujunga Creek-Wash. The dam contains a 1,300-acre (530 ha) reservoir, which is sometimes referred to as Hansen Lake. The spillway structure, outlet works and channel are located near the center of the Dam's rock embankment. The embankment itself follows a slight curve that creates a natural barrier by connecting the hills at either end of the dam. It is southeast of the city of San Fernando.

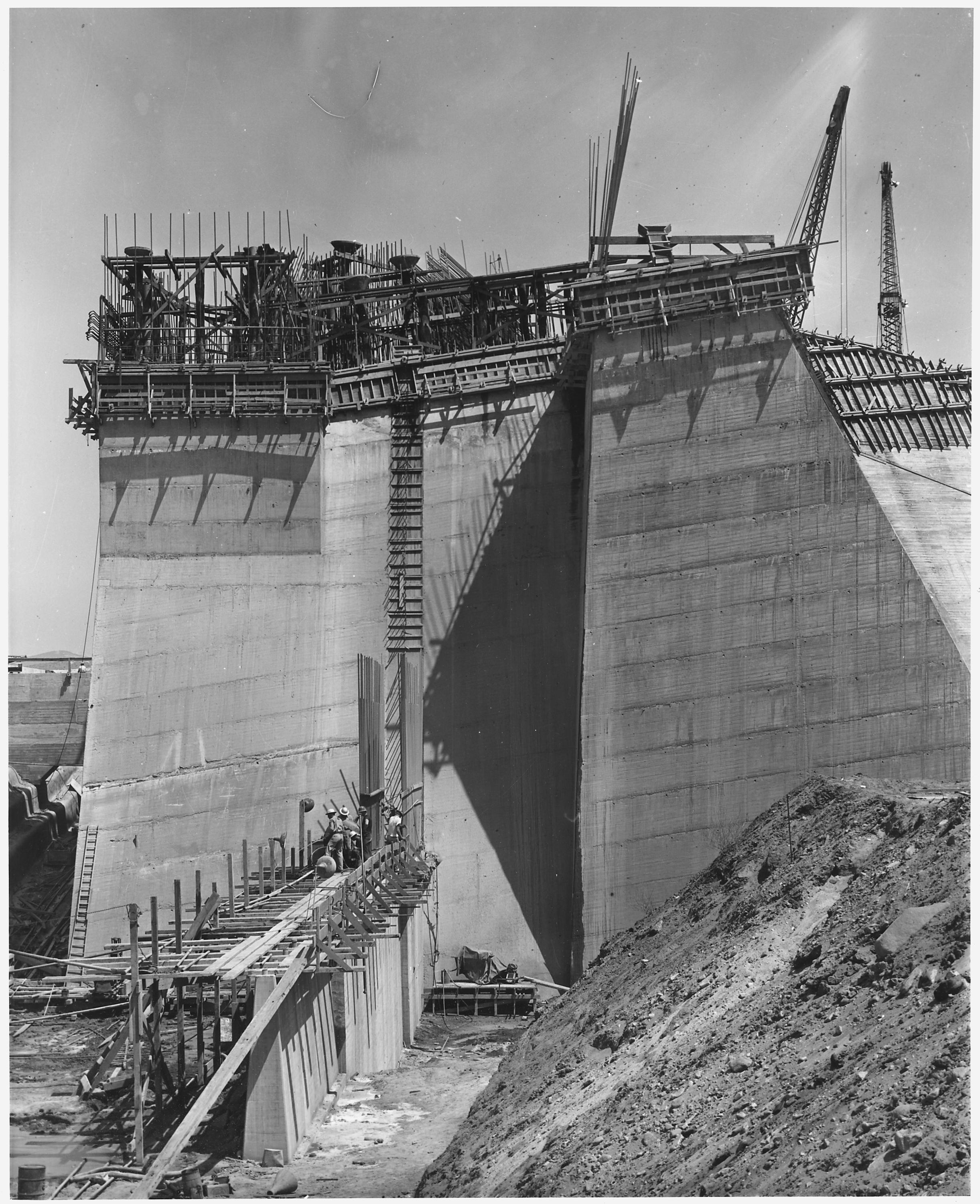
Looking east along the axis of the dam, section of the spillway structure showing the cut-off wall between the spillway and the earth embankment

== History ==
The Los Angeles Flood of 1938, which included significant flooding along the Tujunga Wash and at its confluence with the Los Angeles River, resulted in increased support to dam and channelize the city's creeks and rivers. In 1939, due to repeated floods and the damage they caused in the eastern portions of the San Fernando Valley, the U.S. Army Corps of Engineers began the project. The Corps worked in conjunction with the Los Angeles County Flood Control District (LACFCD). They had already considered planning to implement flood risk management within the area since 1915 after a previous series of floods. In 1939 the Corps, by use of eminent domain, seized the horse ranch of Homer and Marie Hansen to build the dam. After a year of construction and over $11 million in initial costs, the dam and its corresponding facilities were finished. The 2-mile (3.2 km) long, 97-foot (30 m) high dam was built to control the runoff and floodwaters.

During storms and flooding, the dam is intended to catch water within the reservoir. Provisions in the dam's standards of operations promote water conservation efforts coordinated with the Los Angeles County Department of Public Works. The provisions allow the dam to discharge water onto spreading grounds located south of the dam, which then percolates into groundwater recharge basins and is stored as part of the city's water supply.

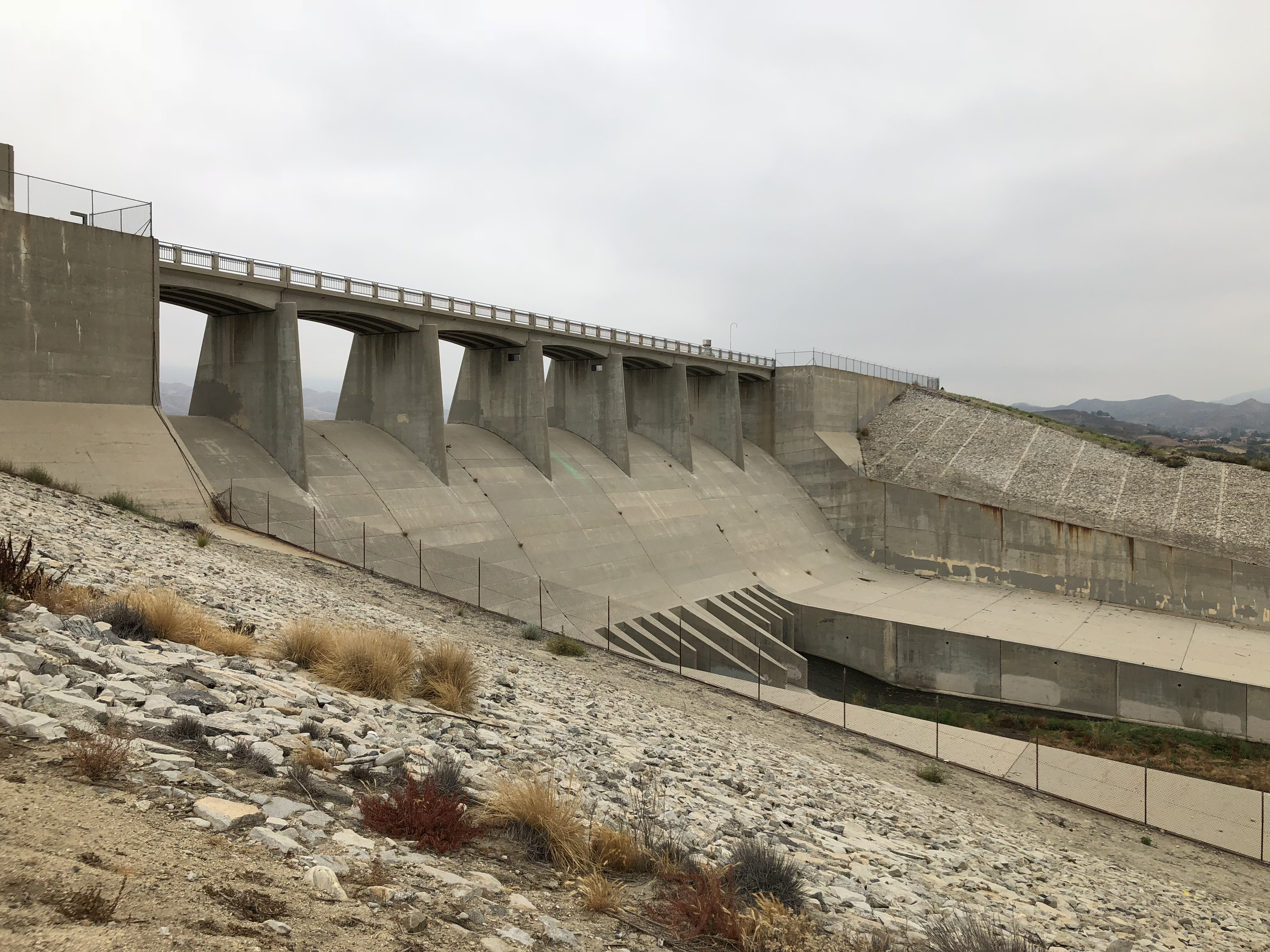
Looking on the south side of the spillway structure and channel

Accumulation of debris from previous floods reduced the amount of storage capacity of the reservoir. As a result, in 1981, the Corps proposed raising the height of the dam rather than starting the expensive process of removing the build up of silt, sand, gravel and other debris. The proposal did not pass, and responsibility was redirected back to the Corps providing maintenance of the dam. The Corps must occasionally excavate sediment and vegetative debris to clear clogged outlet works and maintain full capacity of the dam. In the mid-1940s, the Hansen Dam Basin's recreational possibilities were considered as it attracted thousands of visitors every year. Development of recreational facilities began in 1952 with the creation of Holiday Lake, which was used by swimmers, boaters, and anglers. By 1991, the lake had become completely filled with sediment and was abandoned.

In 2015, KTTV reported that unhoused people were camping at Hansen Dam as a result of California's growing housing crisis. In September 2015, a $300,000 cleanup effort was initiated.

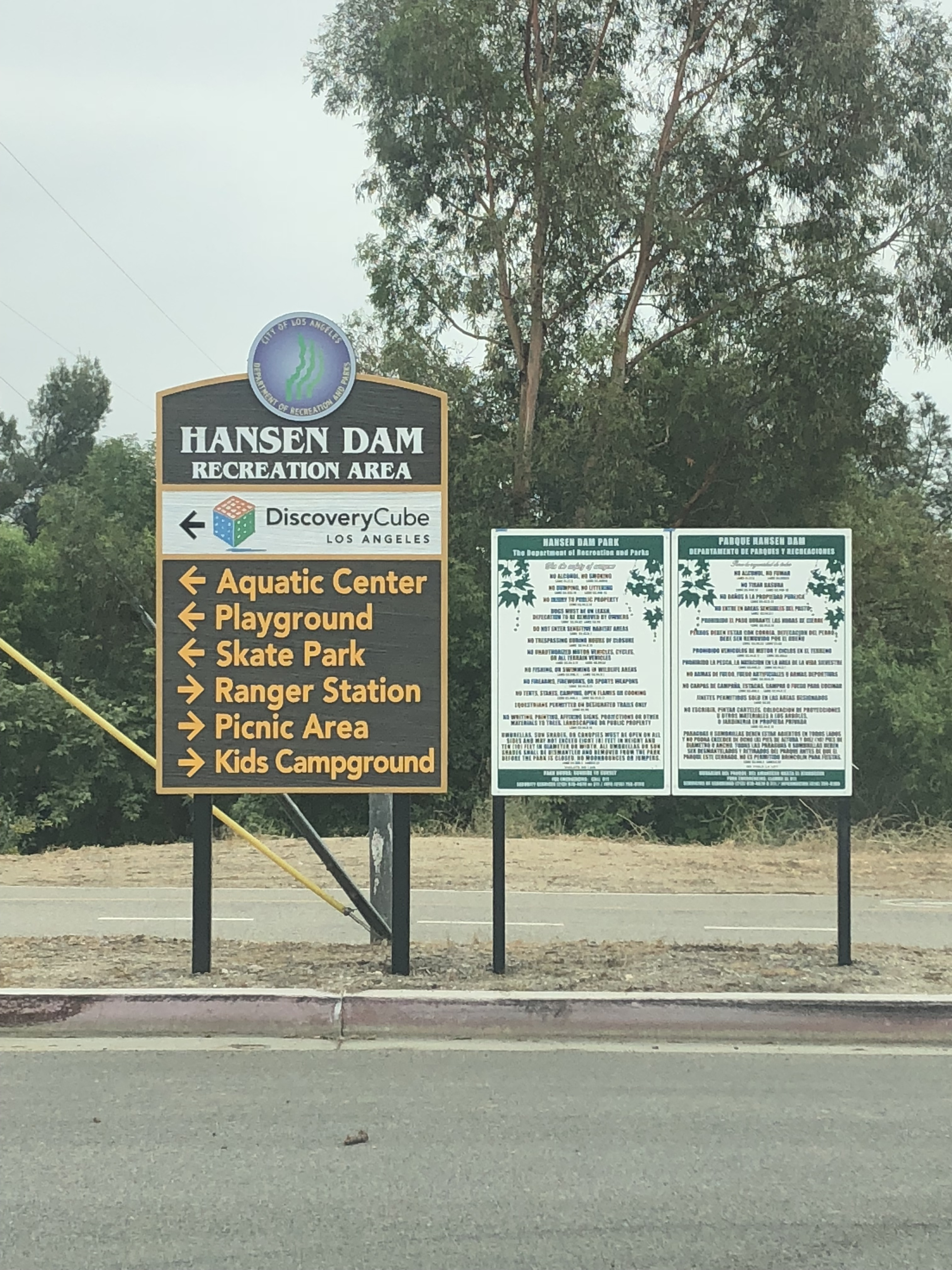
Signage located within Hansen Dam Recreation Area

== Recreation ==
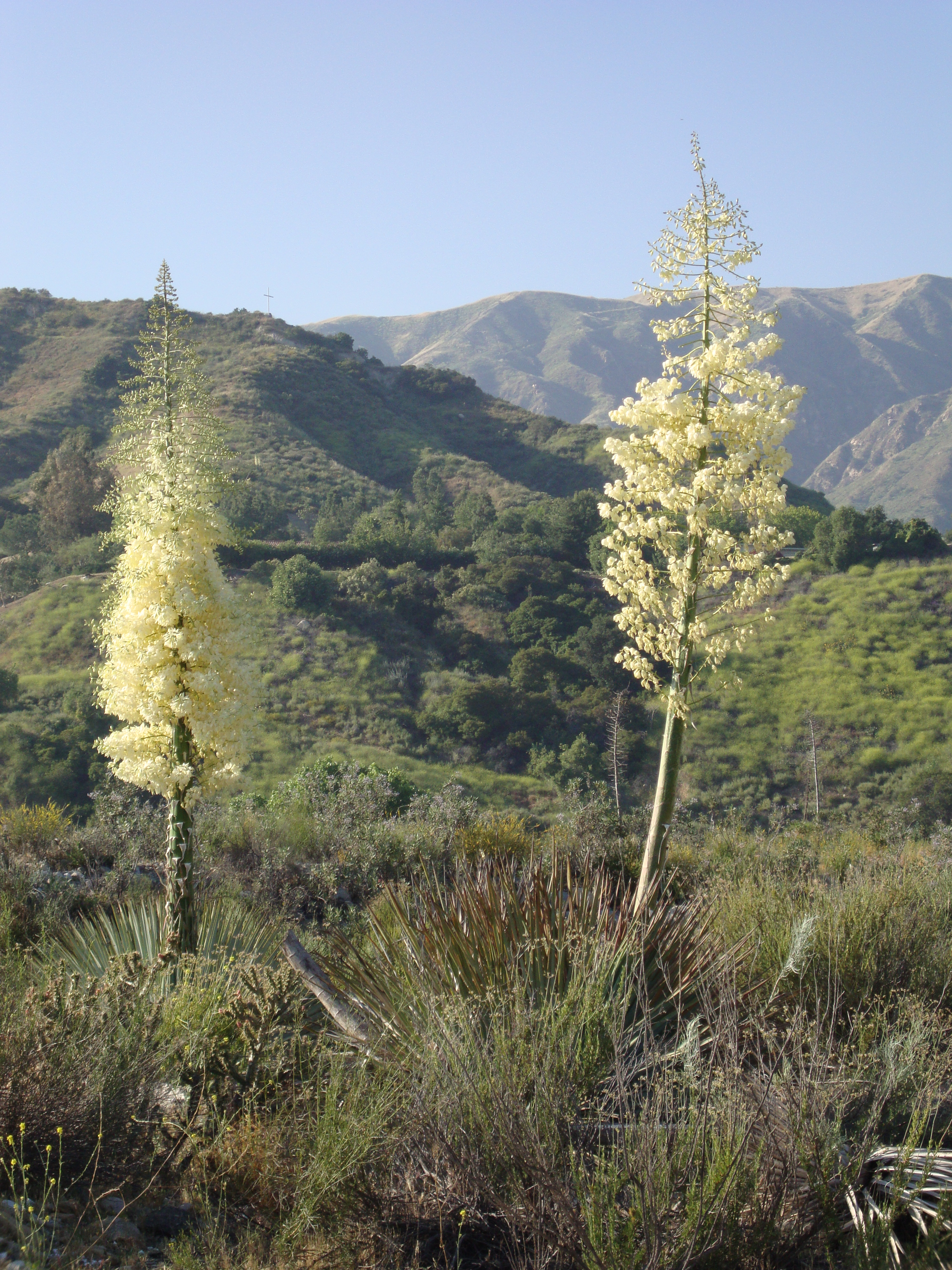
Yucca (Hesperoyucca whipplei) blooming in upper Big Tujunga Wash

The Hansen Dam Recreation Center and Park are located here, with extensive day use facilities operated by the City of Los Angeles Department of Recreation and Parks. Most facilities are accessed from Highways 5 and/or 210.

The Hansen Dam Horse Park and Hansen Dam Aquatic Center are located behind the dam here, and Hansen Dam Golf Course in front.

Recreation Center and Park features a moderate size lake which is filled with circulated drinking water and offers fishing and public boating. The lake is open year-round, including holidays, but may be closed during times of severe weather or for planned events. Also at the site is located a smaller swim lake which features water that is filtered and chlorinated and has a capacity of 2,800 swimmers.

The City of Los Angeles Department of Recreation and Parks provides lifeguards who service to the three lakes within the flood control basin.

The recreation center and park areas also have: picnic tables and barbecue pits, children's play areas; and baseball diamonds and soccer fields.

The park features equestrian and walking trails, that link to those exploring the nearby Angeles National Forest, and a walking pathway along the dam's top. The habitats include montane chaparral and woodlands and riparian in the rustic areas. The basin is a resource of large open space for the Los Angeles region. A large portion of the area remains undeveloped in an effort to conserve natural habitats and maintain the diverse animal and plant species.

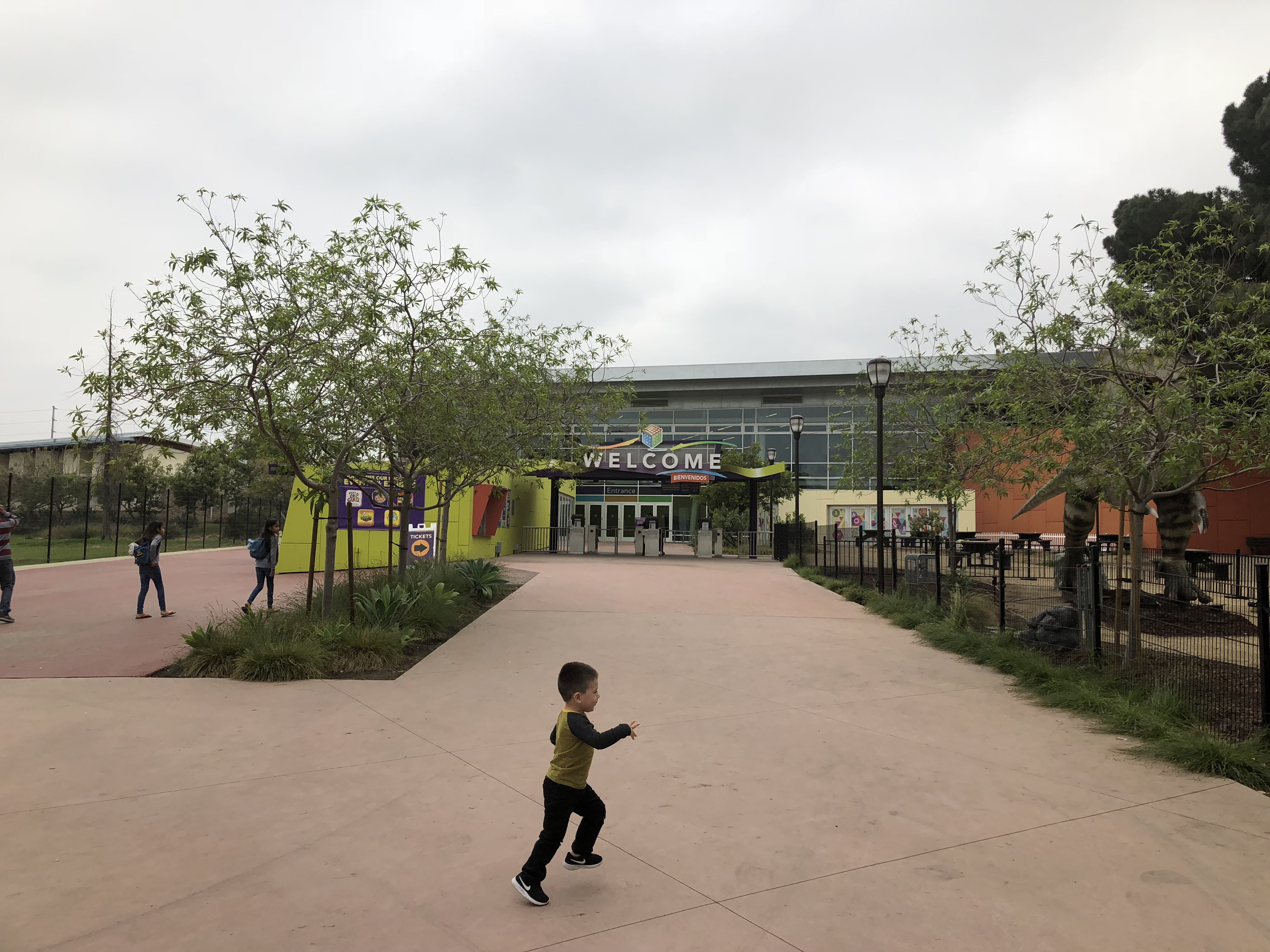
The entrance to the Discovery Cube Los Angeles located in the Hansen Dam recreation area.

The Hansen Dam Park natural area's ecology is being restored, with invasive plants removal and native plant reintroduction. The proposed Rim of the Valley Trail Corridor would include Hansen Dam Park as a significant hub with trailheads.

The Discovery Cube Los Angeles is located at the northwest corner of the recreation area on the intersection of Osborne St. and Foothill Blvd. It was built in November 2014 and was intended to serve as an extension campus of the Discovery Cube Orange County. It has a mix of both traveling and permanent exhibits, which includes work done by the Los Angeles Bureau of Sanitation for waste reduction and resource conservation. It also has sponsored areas by the Los Angeles Department of Water and Power that educate visitors about sustainability, water conservation and preserving natural resources.

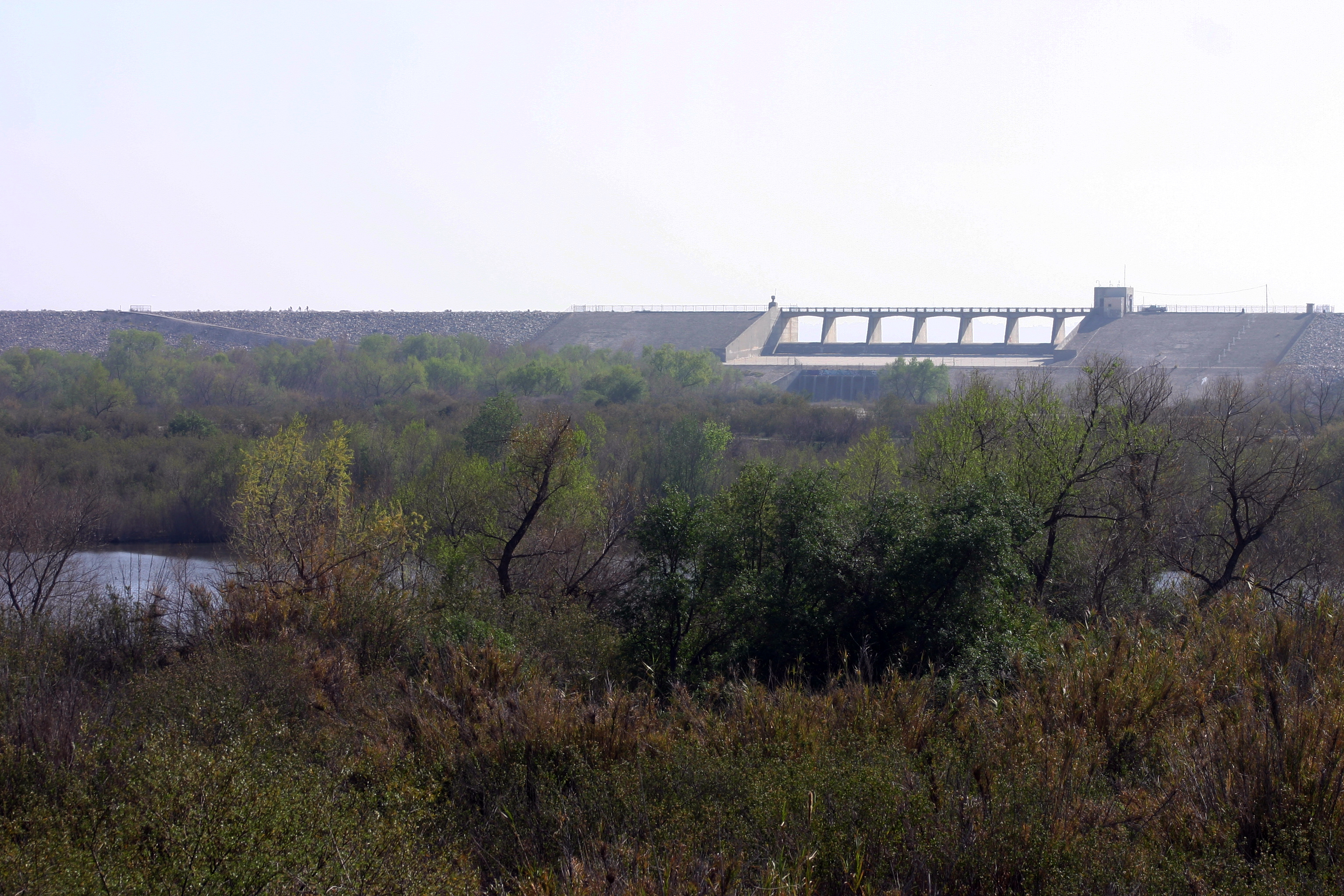
Hansen Dam and the riparian basin

== See also ==
- Creek Fire (2017)
- Index: Parks in the San Fernando Valley
- List of dams and reservoirs in California
