= Los Angeles's 1st City Council district =

American legislative district

Councilmember
Eunisses Hernandez; D–Highland Park
since December 12, 2022
- Demographics: 9.2% White; 2.5% Black; 96.5% Hispanic; 17.6% Asian; 0.4% Other
- Population (2022): 248,124
- Registered voters (2017): 96,058
- Website: cd1.lacity.gov

Los Angeles's 1st City Council district is one of the fifteen districts in the Los Angeles City Council. It is currently represented by Democrat Eunisses Hernandez since 2022, after she beat previous councilmember Gil Cedillo that year.

The district was created in 1925 after a new city charter was passed, which replaced the former at-large voting system for a nine-member council with a district system with a 15-member council. Between 1923 and 1987, District 1 represented all, then parts, of the San Fernando Valley. It was redistricted in 1987 after the death of councilmember Howard Finn to cover an area northwest and north of Downtown Los Angeles in order to provide another majority-Hispanic council district in the city.

== Geography ==
The 1st district encompasses neighborhoods in Northeast Los Angeles and Downtown Los Angeles, including, Glassell Park, Highland Park, Chinatown, Mount Washington, Echo Park, Elysian Park, Westlake, Pico-Union, Koreatown, Angelino Heights, Lincoln Heights, and MacArthur Park. The district is separated from Downtown by the 110 freeway, and the boundary continues northeast until it reaches York Boulevard in Highland Park. The district is approximately 13.5 square miles in area, making it the city's third-smallest council district.

The district is overlapped with California's 34th Congressional district, as well as overlapping with California's 52nd and 54th State Assembly districts and California's 26th and 28th State Senate districts.

=== Historical boundaries ===
The district was preceded by the first ward, established in 1870 when the city was first incorporated. During the ward system in place from 1870 to 1889, it elected three (four from 1874 to 1878) to the Los Angeles Common Council. The first ward included the northern part of Downtown Los Angeles and was within the northwestern portion of the city's original boundaries. The district was obsolete when the at-large district was first established in 1889.

From 1889 to 1909, the ward was re-established, with the boundaries at the Los Angeles River, Mission Street, and Macy Street. It included the neighborhoods of East Lost Angeles, Cypress Park, Mount Washington, and other Eastside Los Angeles communities. It elected one member through a plurality vote before the ward became obsolete when the at-large district was re-established again in 1909.

In 1925, the 1st district was created and was mainly situated within the San Fernando Valley. At its creation, it encompassed all of San Fernando Valley, some of the Santa Monica Mountains reaching south to the Sherman district, the Cahuenga Pass, the Hollywood Hills, Griffith Park, Atwater and the eastern part of the Los Feliz District south to approximately Santa Monica Boulevard. The district office was located in the Roscoe neighborhood. In 1928, the eastern section of the southern boundary was changed from Sunset Boulevard to Fountain Avenue, with the west boundary being along the crest of the Santa Monica Mountains. In 1933, Atwater Village was absorbed into the district, with Los Feliz later being absorbed in 1937.

In 1940, with the rise of the Valley population, the 1st District gave up the Los Feliz and Atwater Village, with its southeast boundary retreating to a point near Cahuenga Boulevard and Mulholland Highway. It was then still the only Valley district. By 1971, the 1st District was the largest geographic area in the city, about 76 square miles, which was a sixth the total area of Los Angeles. It included Arleta, Lake View Terrace, Mission Hills, Pacoima, Shadow Hills, Sunland-Tujunga, Sun Valley and Sylmar.

On August 12, 1986, councilman Howard Finn of died in office, leaving the district without an incumbent. Because of a court order to have the Council redistrict itself to provide more representation for Latinos, the 1st district was redrawn to be in the 69% Latino area north and west of downtown Los Angeles.

== List of members representing the district ==
=== 1889–1909 ===
Councilmember	Party	Years	Electoral history
Single-member ward established February 25, 1889
H. V. Van Dusen (Eastside)	Republican	February 25, 1889 – December 5, 1890	Elected in 1889. Retired.
Francis M. Nickell (Alhambra)	Democratic	December 5, 1890 – December 12, 1894	Elected in 1890. Re-elected in 1892. Lost re-election.
George W. Stockwell (Vermont Square)	Republican	December 12, 1894 – December 16, 1896	Elected in 1984. Lost re-election.
Francis M. Nickell (Alhambra)	Democratic	December 16, 1896 – December 15, 1898	Elected in 1896. Lost re-election.
William H. Pierce (Lincoln Heights)	Republican	December 15, 1898 – December 5, 1902	Elected in 1897. Re-elected in 1900. Retired.
Owen McAleer (Vermont Square)	Republican	December 5, 1902 – December 8, 1904	Elected in 1902. Retired to run for Mayor of Los Angeles.
Fred L. Ford (Eagle Rock)	Republican	December 8, 1904 – December 13, 1906	Elected in 1904. Retired.
R. W. Dromgold (East Los Angeles)	Democrat	December 8, 1906 – December 10, 1909	Elected in 1906. Retired.
Single-member ward eliminated December 10, 1909

=== 1925–present ===
Councilmember	Party	Dates	Electoral history
District established July 1, 1925
Charles H. Randall (Sun Valley)	Prohibition	July 1, 1925 – June 30, 1933	Elected in 1925. Re-elected in 1927. Re-elected in 1929. Re-elected in 1931. Lost re-election.
Jim Wilson (North Hollywood)	Republican	July 1, 1933 – June 30, 1941	Elected in 1933. Re-elected in 1935. Re-elected in 1937. Re-elected in 1939. Lost re-election.
Delamere F. McCloskey (Van Nuys)	Democratic	July 1, 1941 – June 30, 1945	Elected in 1941. Re-elected in 1943. Lost re-election.
Leland S. Warburton (Van Nuys)	Republican	July 1, 1945 – June 30, 1953	Elected in 1945. Re-elected in 1947. Re-elected in 1949. Re-elected in 1951. Retired.
Everett G. Burkhalter (North Hollywood)	Democratic	July 1, 1953 – December 26, 1962	Elected in 1953. Re-elected in 1957. Re-elected in 1961. Resigned after election to the U. S. House of Representatives.
Vacant		December 26, 1962 – January 28, 1963	
Louis R. Nowell (Sunland)	Democratic	January 28, 1963 – June 30, 1977	Appointed to finish Burkhalter's term. Elected in 1963. Re-elected in 1966. Re-elected in 1969. Re-elected in 1973. Retired.
Bob Ronka (Sunland)	Democratic	July 1, 1977 – June 30, 1981	Elected in 1977. Retired to run for Los Angeles City Attorney.
Howard Finn (Sylmar)	Independent	July 1, 1981 – August 12, 1986	Elected in 1981. Re-elected in 1985. Died.
Vacant		August 12, 1986 – February 3, 1987	Chief Legislative Analyst William McCarley appointed as caretaker until next election.
Gloria Molina (El Sereno)	Democratic	February 3, 1987 – March 7, 1991	Elected in finish Finn's term. Resigned after election to the L. A. County Board of Supervisors.
Vacant		March 7, 1991 – August 13, 1991	
Mike Hernandez (Cypress Park)	Democratic	August 13, 1991 – June 30, 2001	Elected to finish Molina's term. Re-elected in 1995. Re-elected in 1997. Retired due to term limits.
Ed Reyes (Mt. Washington)	Democratic	July 1, 2001 – June 30, 2013	Elected in 2001. Re-elected in 2005. Re-elected in 2009. Retired due to term limits.
Gil Cedillo (Highland Park)	Democratic	July 1, 2013 – December 12, 2022	Elected in 2013. Re-elected in 2017. Lost re-election.
Eunisses Hernandez (Highland Park)	Democratic	December 12, 2022 – present	Elected in 2022. Re-elected in 2026.
