= Howard Finn =

American politician

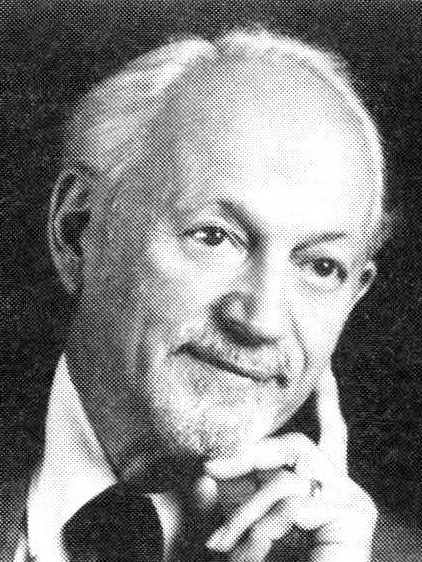
- Official portrait, 1986

Member of the Los Angeles City Council for the 1st district
- In office July 1, 1981 – August 12, 1986
- Preceded by: Bob Ronka
- Succeeded by: Gloria Molina

Personal details
- Born: July 20, 1917 Holyoke, Massachusetts
- Died: August 12, 1986 (aged 69) Boyle Heights, Los Angeles
- Party: Independent
- Other political affiliations: Democratic; Republican
- Spouse: Anne Volk Finn (m. 1942)

Howard Arthur Finn (September 20, 1917 – August 12, 1986) was an expert in city planning, a builder and a land-use consultant who represented part of the San Fernando Valley on the Los Angeles City Council from 1981 until his death in 1986.

== Biography ==
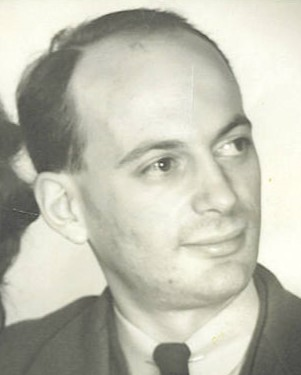
Finn in his earlier adult years.

Finn was born September 20, 1917, in Holyoke, Massachusetts. His family operated a grocery store there, and when Howard was fourteen, they moved to California "in search of new opportunities," Finn earned a bachelor's degree in chemistry from the University of California, Berkeley, in 1939. His first job was as a statistician studying human migration into California for the U.S. Department of Agriculture.

In World War II, Finn worked in Britain as an analyst with the U.S. Foreign Economic Administration. With peace, he returned to California and began to design and build homes. He was "generally regarded" as an expert in city planning and became a "successful construction consultant and land-use activist."

After his election to the City Council in 1981, the "gray-goateed Finn" was known as a "mild-mannered man who preferred discussions of such practical matters as garbage and sewage to more general political topics." Politically, he was a "former Democrat-turned-Republican-turned-registered-Independent."

Finn was stricken while he was conducting a meeting of the council's Planning and Environment Committee at City Hall. He was taken to White Memorial Medical Center in Boyle Heights, where he died on August 12, 1986. He was survived by his wife of 44 years, the former Anne Volk, and daughters Bonnie Haskell, Jocelyn Wyma and Melinda Marchuk. After a tribute in an overflowing City Council chamber, Finn was buried in Eden Memorial Park Cemetery in Mission Hills, with a service conducted by Rabbi Stephen Robbins of Temple Emanuel of Beverly Hills.

== City Council ==
=== Elections ===
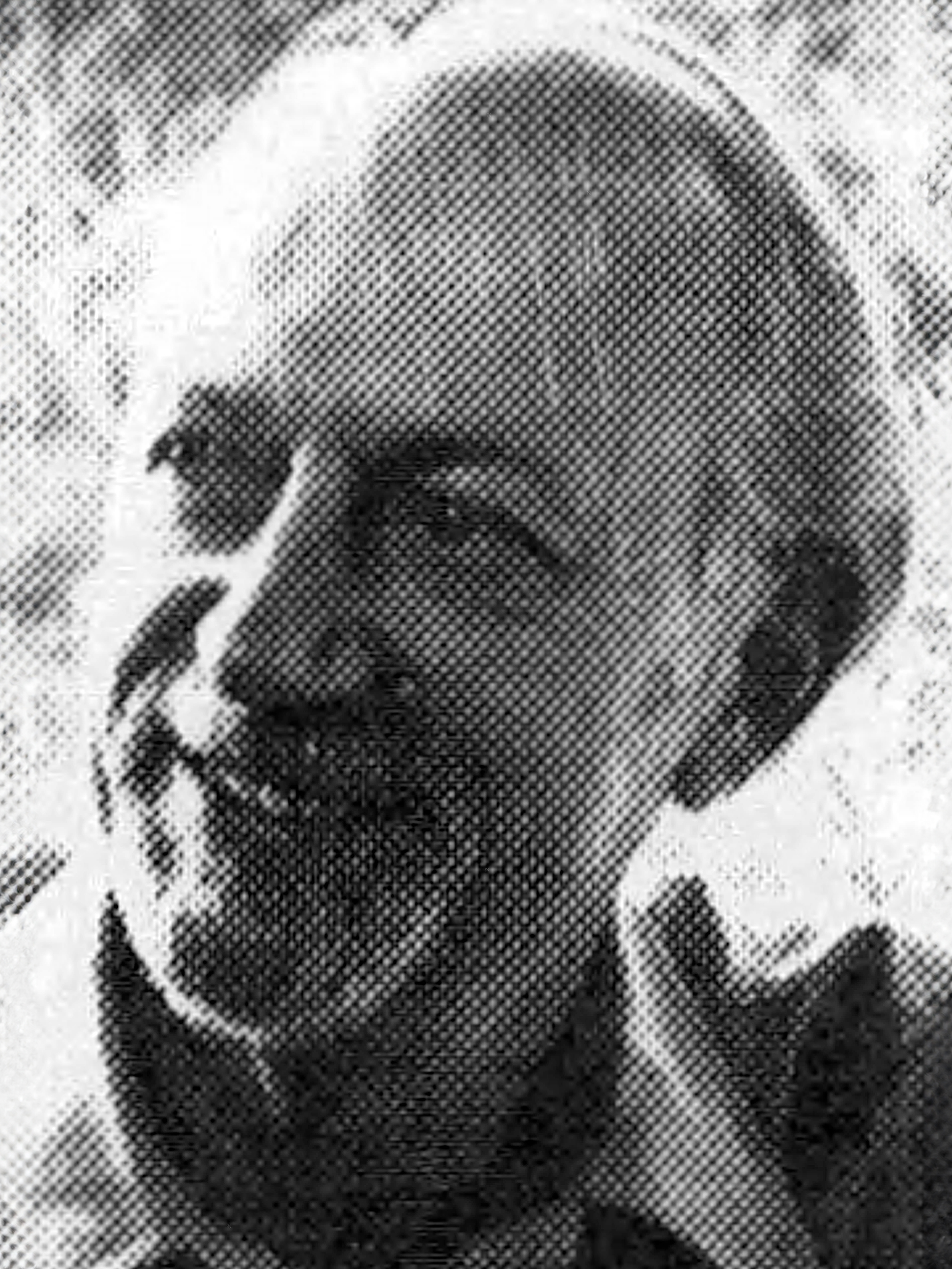
Finn in 1977 while running against Bob Ronka, to whom he lost the election.

Finn lost his bid for the Los Angeles City Council District 1 seat to Louis Nowell in 1973 and to Bob Ronka in 1977. In that era, the 1st was the largest City Council district in the city with a sixth the total area of Los Angeles.

Finn was next appointed by Mayor Tom Bradley to the city Board of Zoning Appeals, where he served three years, two of them as board president. Finn was also on the Mayor's Committee on Affordable Housing. He "doggedly attended community meetings and built a strong network of backers" by 1981, the Los Angeles Times reported. "People who try to run a slick, grabby campaign out here will be surprised on election day, and my plain talking doesn't hurt because I have roots in this area," Finn said.

In 1981 the 63-year-old Finn was seen as "an underdog who finished a surprising second" to former Assemblyman Jim Keysor in the primary race and who suffered from a "plodding campaign style—a tendency to speak in fuzzy, convoluted sentences and technical language."

Nevertheless, he beat Keysor in the final by 1,700 votes despite the fact that the latter had key political endorsements and outspent Finn by almost 2 to 1. Finn was criticized for a last-minute mailing engineered by Harvey Englander, his campaign chief, "falsely suggesting that Keysor had withdrawn from the race," the Times reported. Finn denied that his mailings had brought him victory.

Finn was reelected in the 1981 and 1985 primaries.

=== Highlights ===
Of his tenure, the Los Angeles Times said that Finn's "most telling impact on city affairs came in his role as chairman of the Planning and Development Committee, where the more combative side of his nature came into play in confrontations with environmentalists, who claimed he was pro-development." Finn denied the charge, calling his critics "elitists." The Times obituary added: "His legislative accomplishments included sponsorship of a law making it difficult to open new liquor stores in the city, and of legislation to protect horse owners, many of whom live in his district, from encroachment of new housing."

=== After his death ===
After Finn's death, his widow, Anne Finn, sought appointment to his seat by the City Council, but the council instead took the opportunity to redraw council lines to provide for a district that might elect a Hispanic as a member, as ordered to do by a federal court, and it transferred the 1st District bodily out of the San Fernando Valley into Northeast Los Angeles. A Hispanic, Gloria Molina, was the next incumbent for that district.

Preceded by Bob Ronka	Los Angeles City Council; 1st District; 1981–87	Succeeded by Gloria Molina
