= William Henry Pierce =

William Henry Pierce may refer to:

- William Henry Pierce (missionary) (1856–1948), Canadian First Nations missionary for the Methodist church
- William H. Pierce (1859–1939), founder of Pierce Brothers Mortuary in Southern California
