= Everett G. Burkhalter =

American politician (1897–1975)

Everett Glen Burkhalter
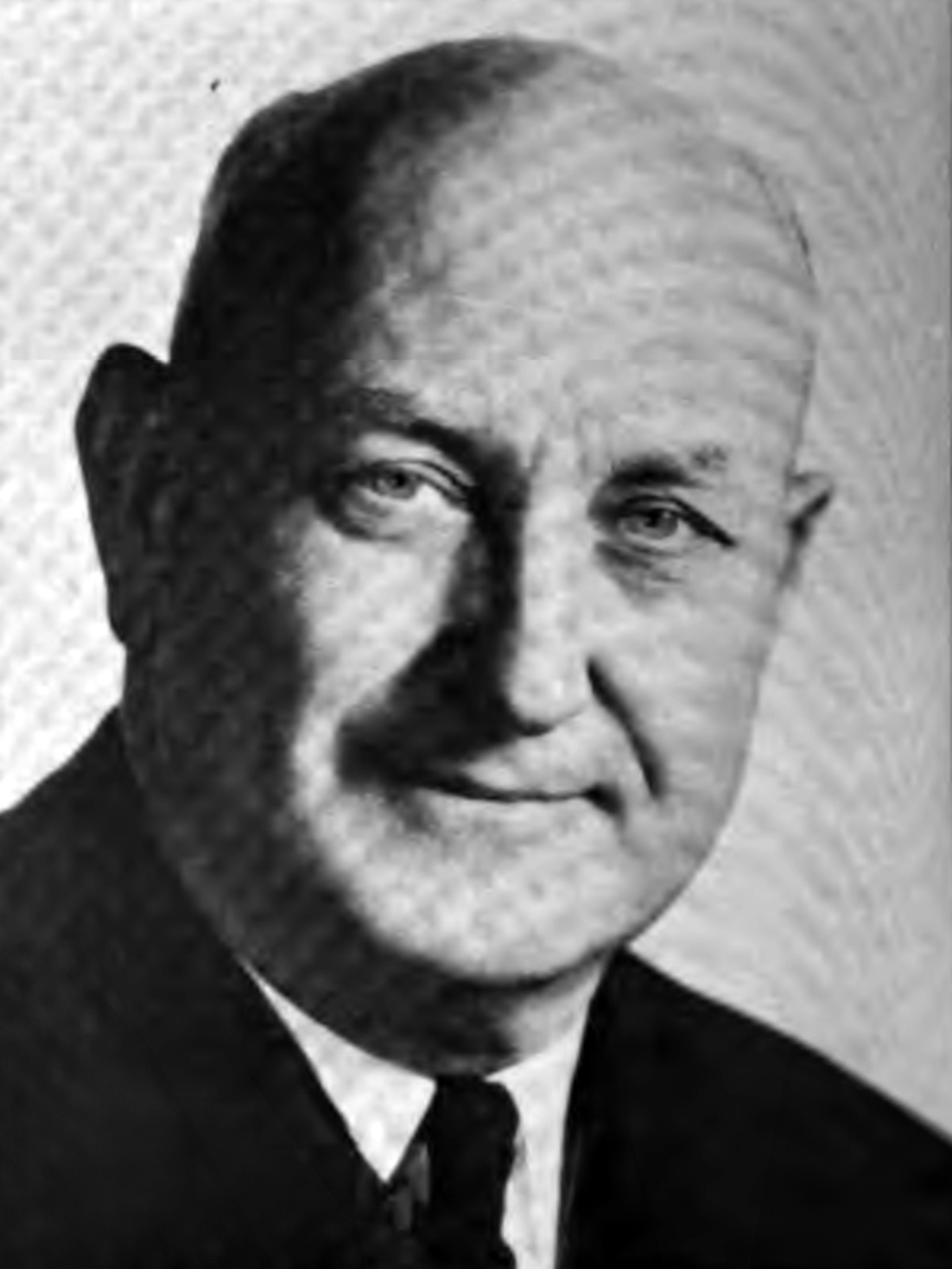
- Official portrait, 1963

Member of the U.S. House of Representatives from California's 27th district
- In office January 3, 1963 – January 3, 1965
- Preceded by: Edgar W. Hiestand (redistricting)
- Succeeded by: Edwin Reinecke

Member of the California State Assembly from the 42nd district
- In office January 3, 1949 – January 5, 1953
- Preceded by: Walter R. Hinton
- Succeeded by: William F. Marsh
- In office January 6, 1941 – January 6, 1947
- Preceded by: Elmer E. Lore
- Succeeded by: Walter R. Hinton

Member of the Los Angeles City Council for the 1st district
- In office July 1, 1953 – December 26, 1962
- Preceded by: Leland S. Warburton
- Succeeded by: Louis R. Nowell

Personal details
- Born: January 19, 1897 Heber Springs, Arkansas, U.S.
- Died: May 24, 1975 (aged 78) Duarte, California, U.S.
- Party: Democratic

Military service
- Branch/service: United States Navy
- Battles/wars: World War I

Everett Glen Burkhalter (January 19, 1897 – May 24, 1975) was an American politician who became a member of the California State Assembly, the Los Angeles City Council and the U.S. House of Representatives in the middle part of the 20th century.

== Biography ==
Burkhalter was born in Heber Springs, Arkansas, on January 19, 1897. He attended schools in Arkansas, Indiana, Colorado and California. He enlisted in the Navy in 1918, was honorably discharged in 1919 and was in the active reserve until 1921. He moved to Los Angeles around 1928 and married his wife, Velma, around 1929. Their home was at 11005 Morrison Street, North Hollywood.

Before and during his political career, which often included considerable "down time," Burkhalter worked as a film studio electrician.

== Public service ==
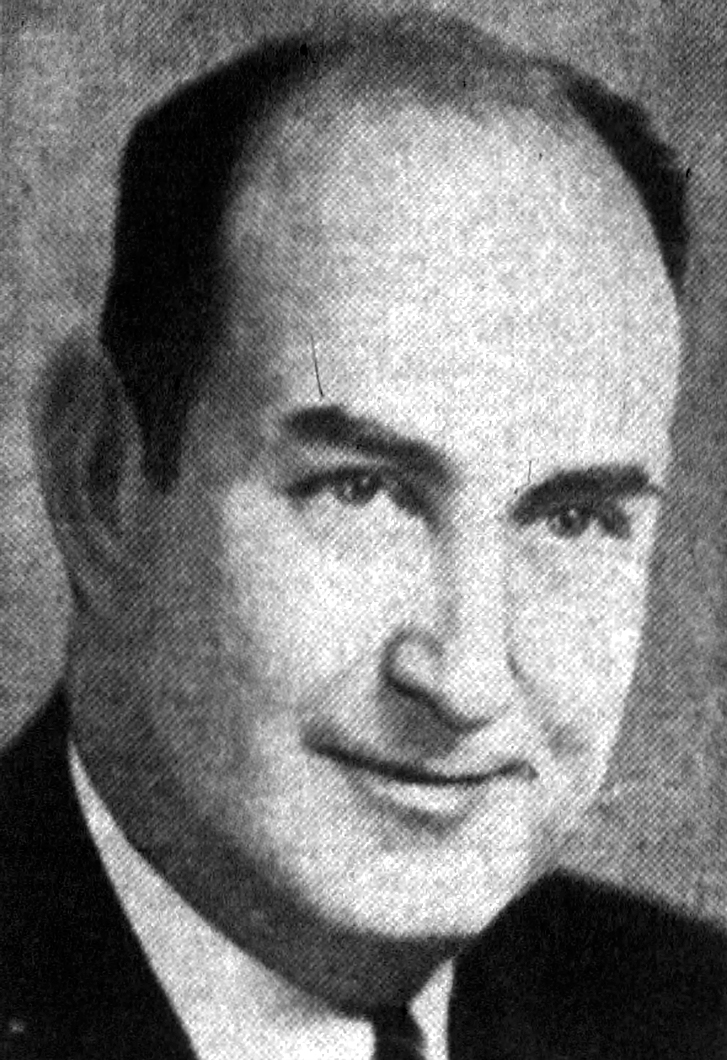
Burkhalter as an assemblymember in 1952.

=== Assembly ===
Burkhalter served in the California State Assembly from the 42nd District as a Democrat from 1941 to 1947. In 1946, he decided not to run for a fourth term and ran for Congress in the 20th District; he lost to Republican incumbent Carl Hinshaw. Two years later, in 1948, Burkhalter ran for his old Assembly seat and won. He was elected to another Assembly term in 1950, but then ran for Congress again in 1952, this time losing to Edgar W. Hiestand in the new 21st District.

=== City Council ===
==== Elections ====
Burkhalter made his first bid for local office in 1939, when he finished third in a field of four candidates for the Los Angeles City Council District 1 seat held by Jim Wilson. After his second defeat in a congressional race, Burkhalter was elected to the City Council on his second attempt, in 1953, replacing Leland S. Warburton in District 1. Burkhalter was reelected in 1957 and 1961 to four-year terms, but he resigned from the Council in 1962 when he finally won an election to Congress.

==== Positions ====
He supported the plan to bring the Brooklyn Dodgers to Los Angeles and building Dodger Stadium in Chavez Ravine for them. Burkhalter also voted for the development of Bunker Hill. Some of his other positions included:

Employment, 1958. Burkhalter voted in favor of establishing a Fair Employment Practices Commission in Los Angeles. The plan lost on a 7–7 tie vote.

Television, 1958. He voted in opposition to pay television in Los Angeles.

Smog, 1959. Burkhalter engaged in a war of words with officials at Kaiser Steel in Fontana when he accused the steelmakers of loosing a "stream of smoke from the plant . . . into the general Los Angeles area. On some days the emissions . . . can be observed from the top of the City Hall."

Movies, 1961. He submitted a resolution urging that a Congressional committee study the problem of American movies' being made overseas. He noted a report that "60% of this country's movies will be made in Europe this year" and that "Communists are being hired in at least one foreign country and that they are doing the work formerly done" in Los Angeles. The resolution was adopted after being amended to include the music industry at the suggestion of Councilman Ernani Bernardi.

HUAC, 1962. Burkhalter announced he would start a fund to send "to Russia" protesters picketing a House Committee on Un-American Activities meeting in Los Angeles, "if they desired to go."

Zoo, 1962. He fought vehemently—but unsuccessfully—to move the Los Angeles Zoo from its location in Griffith Park to Roger Jessup Park in Pacoima, a step that had been recommended by architect Charles Luckman.

=== Congress ===
In 1962, Burkhalter made his third try for a seat in the U.S. House--his second against Republican Edgar Hiestand, an ultraconservative member of the John Birch Society. In the newly drawn 27th District, Burkhalter defeated Hiestand in the general election, 52%-48%.

Burkhalter ended up serving only one term in Congress. Reportedly his experience in the state Assembly, where he found the lawmaking process much more efficient, caused him to become disgusted with the ways of the House. Accordingly, he declined to seek re-election in 1964.

== Death ==
Burkhalter died at age 78 on May 24, 1975, in Duarte, California. Interment was in Forest Lawn Memorial Park-Hollywood Hills. He was survived by his wife of 46 years, Velma, and two brothers, William of Woodland Hills and Lawrence of Los Angeles.

U.S. House of Representatives
| Preceded by Harry R. Sheppard | U.S. House of Representatives; California's 27th district 1963–1965 | Succeeded by Edwin Reinecke |
Political offices
| Preceded by Leland S. Warburton | Los Angeles City Council; 1st district 1953–62 | Succeeded by Louis R. Nowell |
