= Butler, Ohio =

- Village
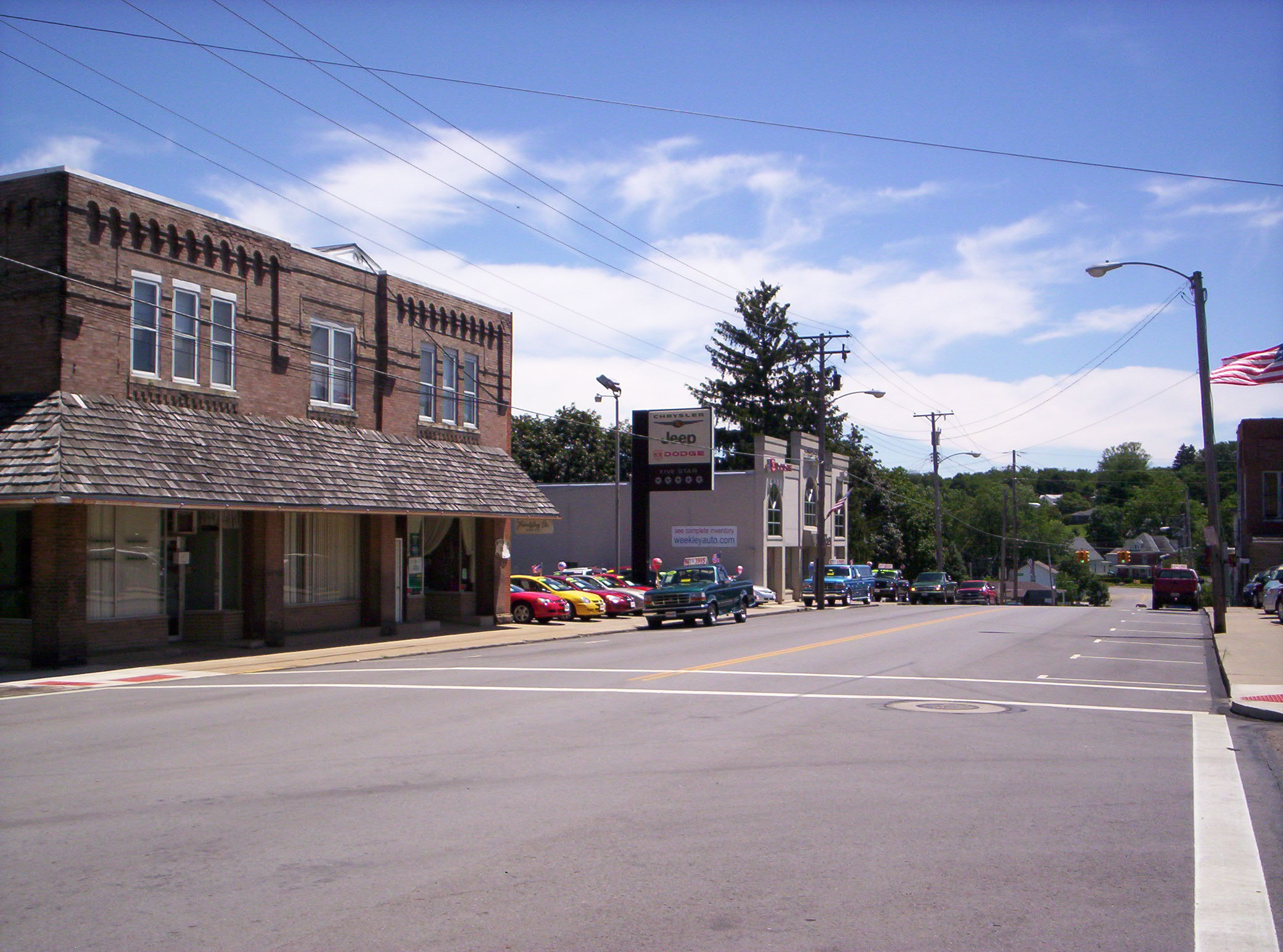
- Downtown Butler on Main Street in 2008

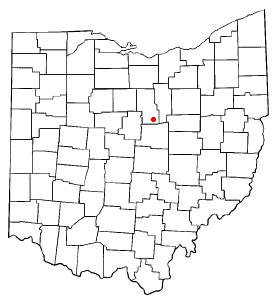
- Location of Butler

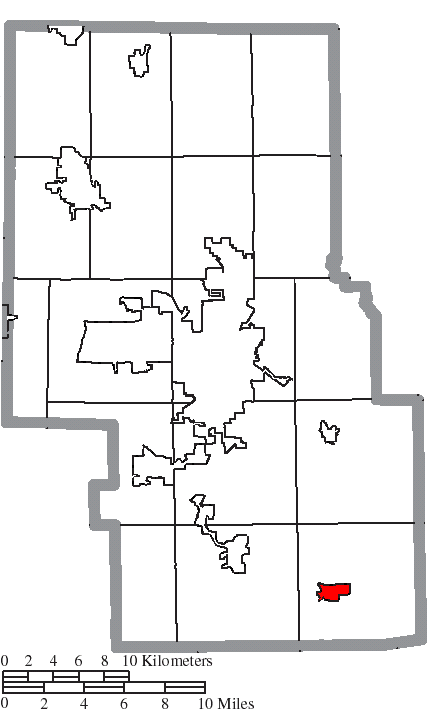
- Location of Butler in Richland County, Ohio
- Coordinates: 40°35′27″N 82°25′18″W
- Country: United States
- State: Ohio
- County: Richland

Area
  - Total: 1.30 sq mi (3.37 km^{2})
  - Land: 1.29 sq mi (3.34 km^{2})
  - Water: 0.012 sq mi (0.03 km^{2})
- Elevation: 1,073 ft (327 m)

Population (2020)
  - Total: 941
  - Estimate (2023): 938
  - Density: 729.2/sq mi (281.56/km^{2})
- Time zone: UTC-5 (Eastern (EST))
  - Summer (DST): UTC-4 (EDT)
- ZIP Code: 44822
- Area code: 419
- FIPS code: 39-10632
- GNIS feature ID: 2397511

Butler is a village in Richland County in the U.S. state of Ohio. It is part of the Mansfield, Ohio Metropolitan Statistical Area. The population was 941 at the 2020 census.

== Geography ==
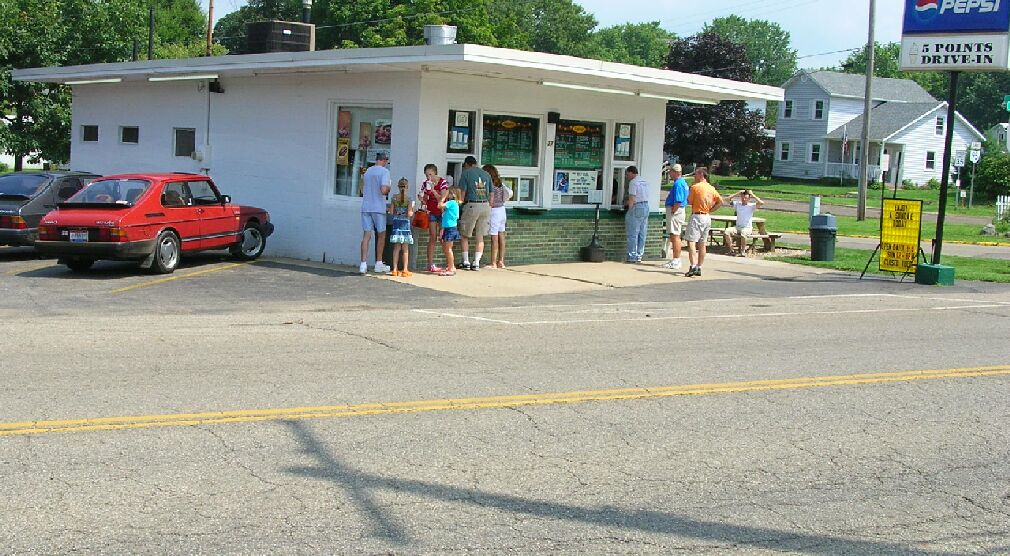
Butler's 5 Points Drive-In

Butler is located along the Clear Fork of the Mohican River.

According to the U.S. Census Bureau, the village has a total area of 1.15 square miles (2.98 km^{2}), of which 1.14 square miles (2.95 km^{2}) is land and 0.01 square miles (0.03 km^{2}) is water.

== Demographics ==
Historical population
Census	Pop.	Note	%±
1880	394		—
1890	266		−32.5%
1900	567		113.2%
1910	730		28.7%
1920	622		−14.8%
1930	634		1.9%
1940	695		9.6%
1950	833		19.9%
1960	976		17.2%
1970	1,052		7.8%
1980	991		−5.8%
1990	968		−2.3%
2000	921		−4.9%
2010	933		1.3%
2020	941		0.9%
2023 (est.)	938	▼	−0.3%

=== 2010 census ===
As of the census of 2010, there were 933 people, 362 households, and 259 families residing in the village. The population density was 818.4 inhabitants per square mile (316.0/km^{2}). There were 393 housing units at an average density of 344.7 per square mile (133.1/km^{2}). The racial makeup of the village was 98.3% White, 0.4% African American, 0.1% Native American, 0.1% Asian, 0.3% from other races, and 0.8% from two or more races. Hispanic or Latino of any race were 1.5% of the population.

There were 362 households, of which 36.5% had children under the age of 18 living with them, 53.3% were married couples living together, 13.0% had a female householder with no husband present, 5.2% had a male householder with no wife present, and 28.5% were non-families. 24.9% of all households were made up of individuals, and 10% had someone living alone who was 65 years of age or older. The average household size was 2.57 and the average family size was 3.05.

The median age in the village was 37.2 years. 26.8% of residents were under the age of 18; 8.7% were between the ages of 18 and 24; 24.6% were from 25 to 44; 24.9% were from 45 to 64; and 15% were 65 years of age or older. The gender makeup of the village was 48.3% male and 51.7% female.

=== 2000 census ===
As of the census of 2000, there were 921 people, 359 households, and 268 families residing in the village. The population density was 856.5 inhabitants per square mile (330.7/km^{2}). There were 386 housing units at an average density of 359.0 per square mile (138.6/km^{2}). The racial makeup of the village was 99.46% White, 0.11% African American, 0.11% Asian, and 0.33% from two or more races. Hispanic or Latino of any race were 0.65% of the population.

There were 359 households, out of which 35.4% had children under the age of 18 living with them, 58.8% were married couples living together, 10.6% had a female householder with no husband present, and 25.3% were non-families. 22.6% of all households were made up of individuals, and 8.9% had someone living alone who was 65 years of age or older. The average household size was 2.57 and the average family size was 2.99.

In the village, the population was spread out, with 26.5% under the age of 18, 8.7% from 18 to 24, 27.9% from 25 to 44, 24.2% from 45 to 64, and 12.7% who were 65 years of age or older. The median age was 36 years. For every 100 females there were 102.4 males. For every 100 females age 18 and over, there were 102.1 males.

The median income for a household in the village was $39,886, and the median income for a family was $45,179. Males had a median income of $37,417 versus $20,750 for females. The per capita income for the village was $18,380. About 2.6% of families and 4.9% of the population were below the poverty line, including 5.5% of those under age 18 and 4.9% of those age 65 or over.

== History ==
As early as 1808, settlers were living in Northeastern Worthington township, however the area that makes up Butler was not recorded until 1820 by Thomas and William Simmons. Joseph Craig was the first white man to settle in the Butler area. James Monroe, the fifth president of the United States, had given Craig a land grant in 1823.

The town of Independence was planned by Daniel Sophn in 1848 and incorporated in 1877. In the early days of its existence it was nicknamed "Spohntown." Though the town was initially named Independence, it later [1891?] changed to Butler to align with the local post office. The Butler post office, and subsequently the town, were named after Mexican-American War hero, General William Butler, of Kentucky. The town had been named Independence by the first postmaster of Butler, T.B. Andrews.

On February 24, 2026, the mayor, Wesley Dingus, resigned in disgrace from his position after a months-long saga where he was arrested for running over a man who fled from police, then charged with voyeurism for smelling a girl's underwear. The voyeurism charges came from a January 2026 incident where Dingus was caught on video sniffing an underage relative's underwear. The other charges came from a July 2025 incident where he ran over a fugitive twice with his car as said fugitive was evading police on foot.

== Education ==
Butler is located within the Clear Fork Valley Local School District. Schools in the district that are located in Butler are Butler Elementary School. Clear Fork Middle School and Clear Fork High School are located just outside Bellville.

Butler has a public library, a branch of the Mansfield–Richland County Public Library.

== Notable person ==
- Jim Wilson, banker and Los Angeles City Council member, born in Butler
