= Bob Ronka =

American politician

- Ronka in 1977

Member of the Los Angeles City Council for the 1st district
- In office July 1, 1977 – June 30, 1981
- Preceded by: Louis R. Nowell
- Succeeded by: Howard Finn

Personal details
- Born: November 2, 1942 (age 83)
- Party: Democratic

Bob Ronka (born November 2, 1942) is an American politician who was a member of the Los Angeles City Council from the San Fernando Valley's 1st District between 1977 and 1981.

== Biography ==
Ronka was born on November 2, 1942, the son of Ilmari Ronka (1905-2001), first-chair trombonist in the NBC Symphony Orchestra, and Loraine Vera Aalbu (1905-1991) of Minneapolis, Minnesota, who worked with her sisters as vaudeville artists. The family moved to California in 1945, and Ronka attended North Hollywood High School, where he played trombone in a dance-band workshop that studied music ranging from the big-band sound of the early 1930s to the progressive jazz of Stan Kenton. He also played with the Dixie Smallfry youth group sponsored by radio-television personality Bill Baldwin.

A Phi Beta Kappa student at Stanford University, Ronka earned a law degree at Harvard University before serving in the Army in Vietnam, where he was awarded a Bronze Star.

== Private practice ==
Ronka spent six years in private practice before his election to the City Council and had ""several years of developing industrial parks."

A Democrat, he was a member of an advisory council formed by Los Angeles District Attorney John Van de Kamp to study reform of the juvenile justice system and was also active with the San Fernando Valley Bar Association.

== City council ==
=== Elections ===
The liberal Ronka, an attorney who specialized in real estate, was elected to represent Los Angeles City Council District 1 in 1977, succeeding veteran Councilman Louis R. Nowell, who did not seek reelection. He defeated the Nowell-backed Jim Peterson by a 62%-38% margin and served for just four years.

In that era (1971), the 1st District was the largest geographic area in the city, about 76 square miles, which was a sixth the total area of Los Angeles. It included Arleta, Lake View Terrace, Mission Hills, Pacoima, Shadow Hills, Sunland-Tujunga, Sun Valley and Sylmar.

The councilman took preliminary steps toward running against Baxter Ward for the county Board of Supervisors in 1972, but decided against it when private polls showed the Ronka name was not recognized in the supervisorial district.

=== Highlights ===
==== Recall ====
Ronka faced a recall petition in 1978 in which he was accused of, among other things, receiving unreported cash contributions from the "Mexican Mafia" and of failing to report the gift of a trip to Hawaii and ownership of real property in Westlake Village. The allegations of criminal activity were investigated by the district attorney's office, which found no reason to continue the probe. The petition lacked enough signatures to bring about an election.

==== Olympics ====
The councilman was one of the leading skeptics about the idea of hosting the 1984 Summer Olympics, for which Los Angeles was the only candidate. He sought assurance that the games would cost the city nothing, and he favored asking the voters to decide by ballot if the competitions should be held in the city at all. This ultimately resulted in a ballot measure forbidding Los Angeles from spending taxpayer monies on the games without reimbursement.

Ronka was on the negotiating team with Mayor Tom Bradley and a Bradley aide, Anton Calleia, which dickered in 1978 with the International Olympic Committee in Athens, Greece, over terms of the contract to bring the games to California, "and every time Bradley and Calleia appeared to give way on a point, he [Ronka] objected publicly." Soon the councilman was "shunted aside" from the negotiations, and he returned from Athens a day before the others to tell reporters that Bradley and Calleia had been "double-crossed" by "landed gentry and . . . brittle, archaic, arcane aristocrats." "Lord Killanin," Ronka said, speaking of the Irish president of the Olympic Committee, "has shown himself again to be totally brittle and autocratic and inflexible." In the final City Council decision, Ronka voted against the contract, but it was nevertheless approved, 8–4.

==== Flooding ====
He gained favorable citywide publicity in February and March 1978 when he cut short a vacation in Acapulco, Mexico, (from a planned three days to an actual twenty minutes) to return home when he heard that heavy storm waters had flooded the Sunland-Tujunga area. The Los Angeles Times reported: "Ronka slipped out of his low-profile image when disaster struck his district Feb. 9, and subsequently he has become almost as regular a television figure as the weatherman." Interviews by "Mr. Clean, as the Harvard-educated freshman councilman is sometimes called . . . may be turning into political gold." Ronka warned that "Body parts and human flesh" from the flooded Verdugo Hills Cemetery and rats and poisons and dead snakes were threatening the area. City officials played down the alarmist reports, but residents said they were grateful for Ronka's on-the-scene presence and his fight in City Hall to cut red tape. (According to Thomas Noguchi's book Coroner, some 100 bodies were indeed sent plunging from the flooded cemetery into homes, businesses and city streets.)

==== Aides ====
In 1978 Ronka verified a Los Angeles Times report that he had hired five former political campaign workers as City of Los Angeles employees to work for him under the federal Comprehensive Employment and Training Act but said: "They were qualified, they are hard workers, they weren't coming in on a tenured position. I make no apologies for them." One of the aides, Larry Hanna, was fired by Ronka and led a recall drive against him (above). It was soon determined that other council members had made the same kind of appointments, and a few weeks later the U.S. Department of Labor announced that it would no longer pay the salaries—about $3 million annually—to the council-hired workers.

==== Reputation ====
It was said that Ronka was disliked by his fellow City Council members because he was not a team player but instead acted like a "publicity hound." Bad feeling developed, for example, between Ronka and Council President John Ferraro, who was "astonished and angry" when Ronka voted against the Olympics contract although Ferraro had felt he had Ronka's firm commitment to vote in favor. As well, some other city officials felt that Ronka was grandstanding in his publicity during the Sunland-Tujunga floods (above).

== City attorney campaign ==
Ronka did not run for reelection in 1981 but was an unsuccessful candidate for city attorney instead. His political campaign caused a citywide furor with television ads saying that the councilman's opponent, City Controller Ira Reiner, had represented Leslie Van Houten, an associate of mass murderer Charles Manson, as her attorney in court. Another spot said Reiner was "private attorney (for the) Manson family." A campaign mailer claimed that Reiner had "solicited Manson as a client in order to draw press attention and make himself famous." (Reiner actually had served briefly as Van Houten's attorney but "was dismissed when he insisted on separating her defense from Manson's and going against Manson's wishes.") Ronka ordered the ads pulled, but the damage was done: Support fell away, and the editorial page of the Los Angeles Times withdrew its endorsement. Ronka survived the primary election in April but lost to Reiner in June, 231,540 to 133,205.

== Calabasas ==
Ronka retired to Calabasas, California, where he is active in community affairs. In 1988, he sued Stephen Chrystie, his former attorney, for "breach of trust and fraud" in managing a blind trust while Ronka was on the Los Angeles City Council. He said that the attorney lost him $1.4 million and also invested in slum property, a "potential political embarrassment" that contributed to his decision not to run for council in 1987. Chrystie denied the charge and said that "Mr. Ronka has retired on the millions I made for him." Ronka told a reporter that most of his income came from profitable investment in the Warner Center development in Woodland Hills. The outcome of the suit is not in the public record.

Preceded by Louis R. Nowell	Los Angeles City Council; 1st District; 1977–81	Succeeded by Howard Finn
