= Leland S. Warburton =

American politician

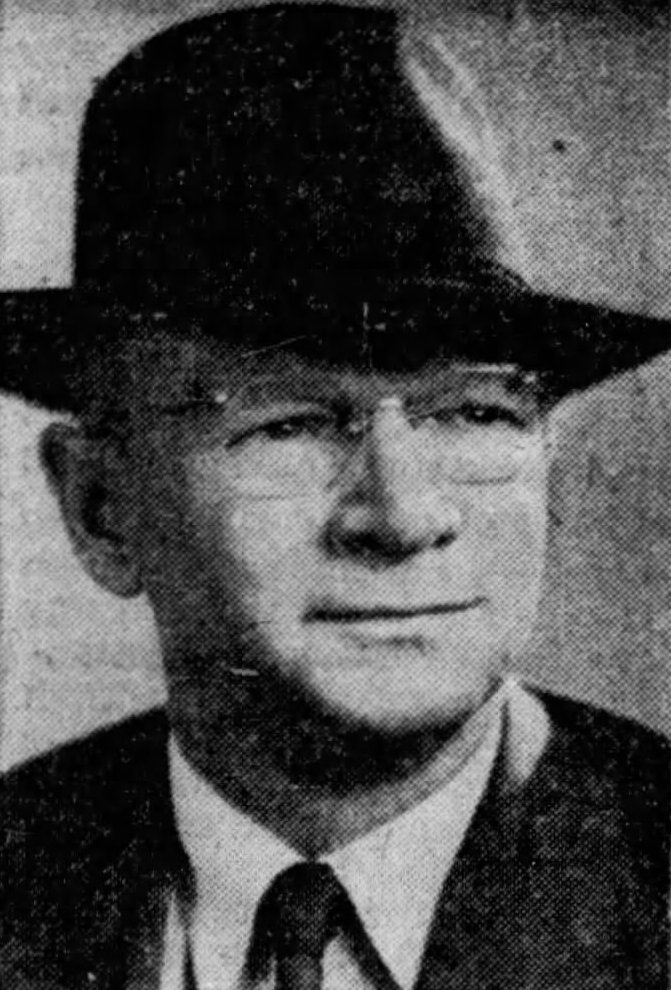
- Warburton in 1949

Member of the Los Angeles City Council for the 1st district
- In office July 1, 1945 – June 30, 1953
- Preceded by: Delamere Francis McCloskey
- Succeeded by: Everett G. Burkhalter

Personal details
- Born: March 17, 1901
- Died: April 29, 1977 (aged 76)
- Party: Republican
- Relatives: Cotton Warburton (brother)

Leland S. Warburton (March 17, 1901 – April 29, 1977) was a member of the Los Angeles City Council from 1945 to 1953.

== Biography ==
Warburton was born on March 17, 1901, the son of Margaret Warburton of Scotland, who died at the age of 81 in May 1961. His brothers were Milton, Lawrence, David and all-American football player Irvine "Cotton" Warburton. He had a son, Don Lee Warburton. He was a veteran of either the Navy or the United States Coast Guard, where he served in the South Pacific as a chief petty officer.

He died on April 29, 1977.

== City Council ==
=== Elections ===
Warburton was a public relations man when he "decisively defeated" Delamere F. McCloskey in a race for the 1st District seat to represent the San Fernando Valley on the Los Angeles City Council in 1943. He was reelected in 1947, 1949 and 1951 but did not stand for reelection in 1953.

=== Positions ===
Rose Bowl, 1946. In reaction to public displeasure with the way tickets had been distributed for the 1946 Rose Bowl game, Warburton introduced a resolution that would have the City Council sponsor an "intersectional contest" in the Coliseum with all tickets, with the exception of a limited number assigned to competing colleges, 'sold to citizens on a first-come, first served basis.'"

Shakespeare, 1947 Warburton suggested to his fellow councilmen that a quotation from William Shakespeare be placed in the City Council chamber to remind them all of the duties of their office, specifically,

This above all: to thine own self be true, And it must follow, as the night the day, Thou canst not then be false to any man.

Member G. Vernon Bennett suggested "But too many issues confuse the politician," and Warburton responded with another Shakespeare quotation, "I have said too much unto a heart of stone." The issue was referred to the Board of Public Works and the Art Commission.

Rail transit, 1948. He spoke for a rail transportation corridor to be built in connection with the Hollywood Freeway, then under construction.

McGroarty, 1948. He proposed the idea that the home of John Steven McGroarty in Tujunga be perpetuated as a state park. It was eventually taken over by the city and developed as the McGroarty Arts Center.

Chinchillas, 1950. Warburton called on the Planning Commission to make a "scientific study" of whether the then-current fad for raising chinchillas required five acres of space like other fur-bearing animals. "Chinchilla raising is becoming a popular avocation in the Valley . . . and their owners say they don't need any more room than any other pet," he said.

Communists, 1950. He supported a city ordinance that required Communists to register with the police department. He told the council:

When I got home from the football game last night there were about 50 persons, mostly women, picketing my place about this Communist ordinance. They were apparently mostly wild-eyed pinks and Communists. . . . They said they would take care of me at the elections next May but a lot of them couldn't talk English and I doubt that they even live in my district.

Housing, 1951. Warburton was a strong supporter of a bitterly disputed $100 million citywide public housing program that was eventually rejected by the City Council.

Preceded by Delamere Francis McCloskey	Los Angeles City Council; 1st district 1945–53	Succeeded by Everett G. Burkhalter
