= Delamere Francis McCloskey =

American politician and lawyer

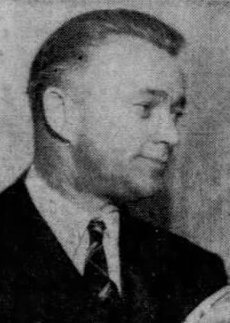
- McCloskey in 1944

Member of the Los Angeles City Council for the 1st district
- In office July 1, 1941 – June 30, 1945
- Preceded by: Jim Wilson
- Succeeded by: Leland S. Warburton

Personal details
- Born: April 29, 1897; Canada
- Died: December 14, 1983 (aged 86)

Delamere Francis McCloskey (April 29, 1897 – December 14, 1983) was a Canadian-born American attorney and politician, who represented the 1st District on the Los Angeles City Council from 1941 to 1945.

== Biography ==
McCloskey was born April 29, 1897, in Canada and became a United States citizen in 1928. His mother's birth name was Price. McCloskey was admitted to the bar in California on June 3, 1930. His wife, Irene, died of burns suffered in a December 13, 1965, accident in the back yard of their home at 13511 Hart Street, Van Nuys. He died December 14, 1983.

== Public office ==
=== Elections ===
==== Municipal court ====
McCloskey, who was endorsed by the End Poverty in California organization, ran second in an election to replace Municipal Judge Marchetti, Office No. 10, in the primary election of April 1935 but was challenged by the next runner-up, Lyndon Bowring, because McCloskey had not been a California lawyer for the required five years, as required by the state constitution. McCloskey argued that he would have been eligible, if elected, on the day of taking office, July 1, but the Supreme Court of California disagreed and ordered McCloskey off the final ballot in June and Bowring to take his place.

==== City Council ====
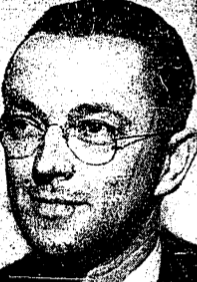
McCloskey in 1943.

In his first bid for City Council in 1939 in Los Angeles City Council District 1, representing the San Fernando Valley, McCloskey survived the first round of voting but was defeated by the incumbent, Jim Wilson, in the final election. In the 1941 final, though, it was McCloskey who was the winner over Wilson. McCloskey had no serious opposition in 1943 and was reelected in the primary vote. In 1945, however, he was ousted by Leland S. Warburton in the final election.

==== Superior Court ====
While a City Council member in 1944, he ran for Office No. 1 in the Los Angeles County Superior Court against the incumbent, Charles S. Burnell, but lost by a 3–1 ratio.

=== City Council ===
Speed traps, 1941. He condemned a "speed trap" policy, "in which motorcycle policemen hide behind gas stations and billboards to pounce upon the unwary motorist." He said better results could be obtained by having the officers patrol the streets in plain sight.

Stoves, 1942. McCloskey was responsible for rescuing twenty-five pot-bellied stoves, "discarded by the Fire Department, relics of those days when outlying fire stations were without gas." The stoves were reconditioned and lent to the Red Cross "so soldiers occupying isolated searchlight posts in the San Fernando Valley could keep warm on winter nights."

Taxes, 1943. He submitted a resolution that would have levied a 0.05% municipal sales tax, noting that:

Since the advent of the war, many thousands of persons from other states who earn large salaries in war industries and do not own any real property have become residents . . . [who are] receiving the benefits of representation without taxation.

Objectors, 1944. McCloskey voted in favor of a bill that would have given returned veterans preference over reemployment of conscientious objectors who had been given leaves of absence from their city service in order to enter special work camps set aside for them. He wrote to Wendell L. Miller, a minister who objected to his stance:

... if all of our young men entered such refuges ... the nation would cease to exist and we would become vassals of the Japs and the Huns.

Hog ranch, 1944. The City Council unanimously adopted McCloskey's resolution asking federal and state authorities to investigate a report that Japanese and Japanese-American detainees at Manzanar, California, would be put to work operating a large hog ranch that might pollute Los Angeles municipal water supplies from the Owens Valley.

Preceded by Jim Wilson	Los Angeles City Council; 1st district 1931–45	Succeeded by Leland S. Warburton
