= Potbelly stove =

Type of cast iron wood burning stove

A potbelly stove is a cast-iron, coal-burning or wood-burning stove that is cylindrical with a bulge in the middle. The name is derived from the resemblance of the stove to a fat person's pot belly. Potbelly stoves were used to heat large rooms and were often found in train stations or one-room schoolhouses. The flat top of the stove allows for cooking food or heating water.

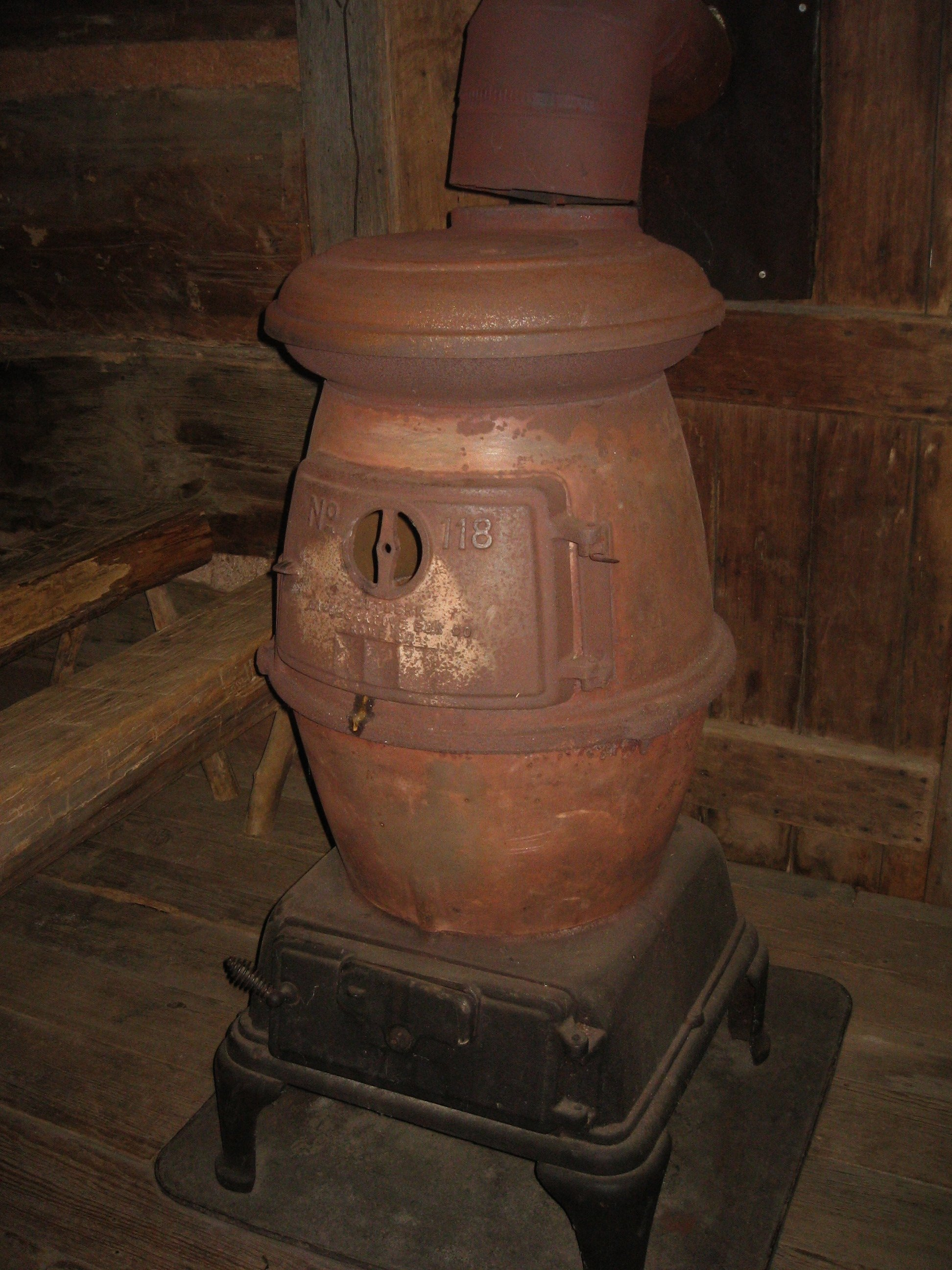
Potbelly stove at the Museum of Appalachia

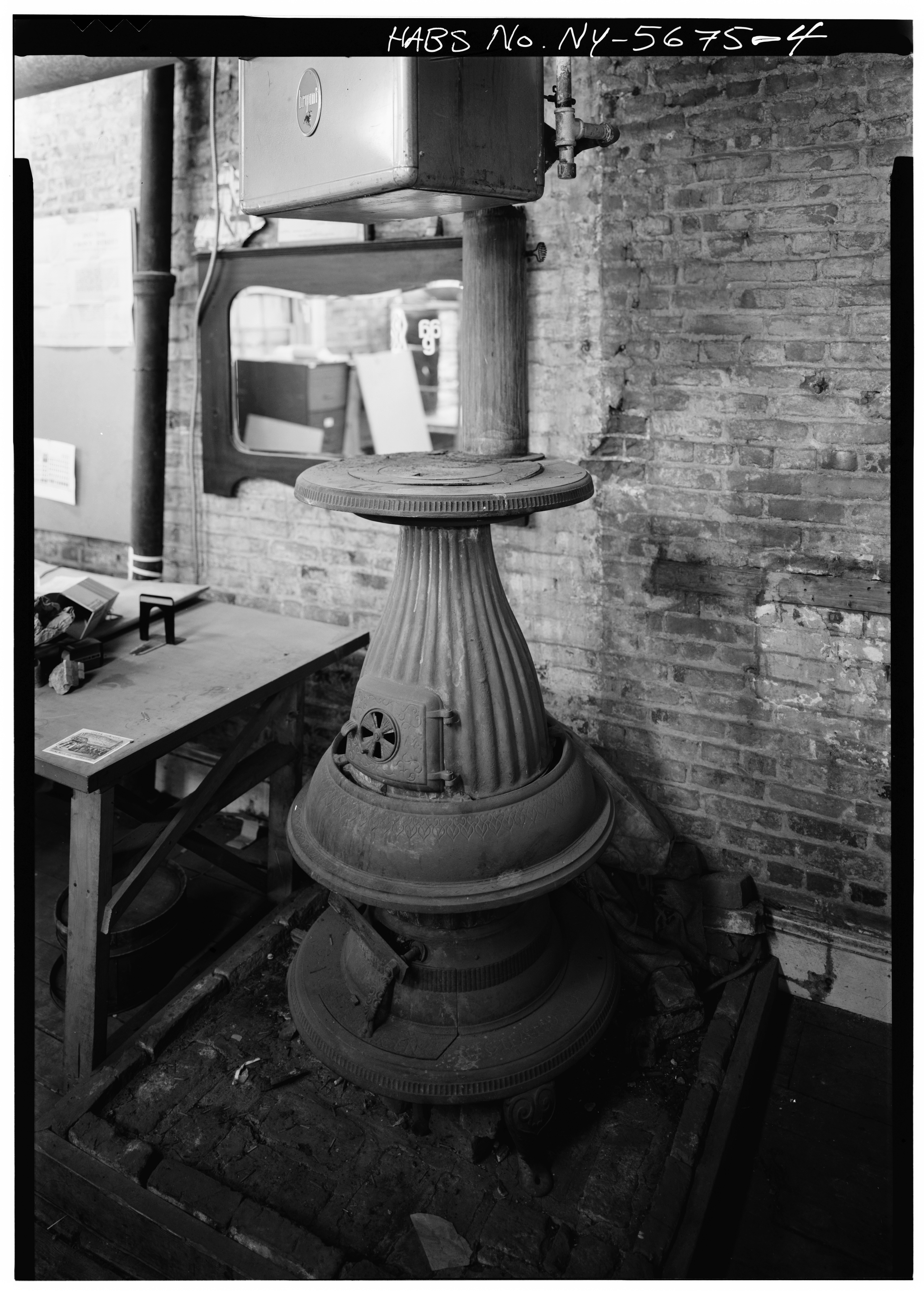
Potbelly stove in the South Street Seaport Museum, New York

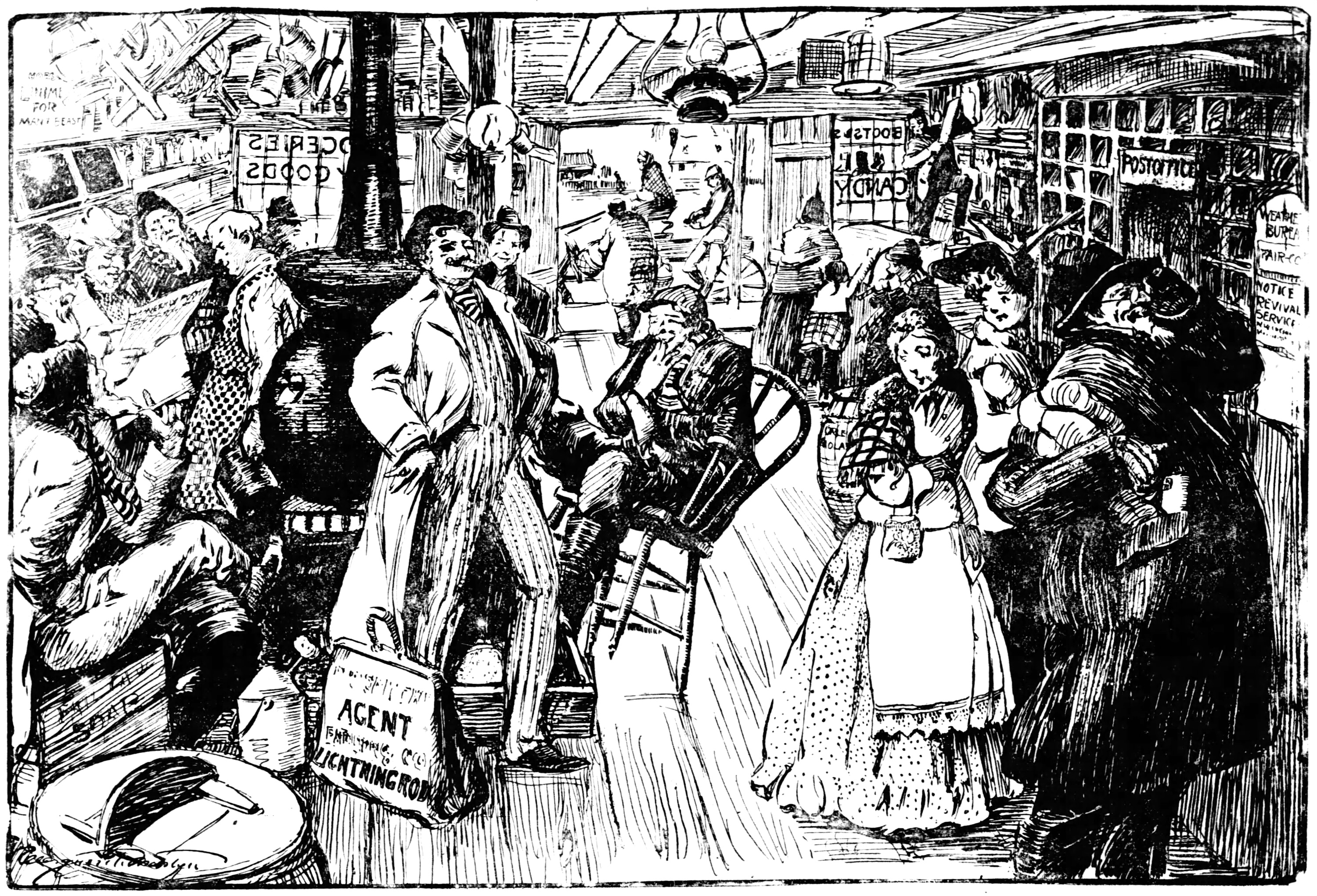
Fanciful drawing by Marguerite Martyn in the St. Louis Post-Dispatch of October 21, 1906, of a country store, centered by a potbelly stove

== See also ==
- Delamere Francis McCloskey, Los Angeles City Council member, 1941–43, rescued potbelly stoves for use in air-raid defense posts
- Franklin stove
- List of stoves
- Red Cross stove
