= Edgar W. Hiestand =

American politician (1888–1970)

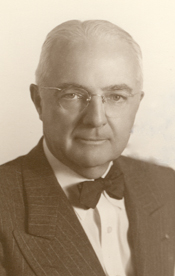

Member of the U.S. House of Representatives from California's 21st district
- In office January 3, 1953 – January 3, 1963
- Preceded by: Harry R. Sheppard
- Succeeded by: Everett G. Burkhalter (redistricting)

Personal details
- Born: Edgar Willard Hiestand; December 3, 1888 Chicago, Illinois, United States
- Died: August 19, 1970 (aged 81) Pasadena, California, United States
- Resting place: San Gabriel Cemetery, San Gabriel, California, United States
- Party: Republican
- Education: Dartmouth College
- Occupation: Businessman and politician

Edgar Willard Hiestand (December 3, 1888 – August 19, 1970) was an American businessman and politician. A staunch anti-communist, he served ten years in the United States Congress.

== Early life and education ==
Born in Chicago, Illinois, Hiestand was a 1910 graduate of Dartmouth College in Hanover, New Hampshire.

Prior to being elected to Congress, Hiestand engaged in a career of retailing, concluding with Sears, Roebuck and Co. in Glendale, California.

== Congress ==
A Republican and member of the John Birch Society, he represented California's 21st congressional district from 1953 until 1963, when he was defeated by Everett G. Burkhalter, a Los Angeles city councilman.

The 21st district covered the northern 2/3 of Los Angeles County, including the cities of Pasadena and Sierra Madre on the east to Burbank and the San Fernando Valley on the west and the Antelope Valley (including Edwards Air Force Base) on the north. In 1962, the Democratic-majority California Legislature re-districted Hiestand into the western section of the old 21st district, which was more heavily Democratic; this led to his defeat by Democrat Everett G. Burkhalter.

=== Issues ===
Hiestand voted in favor of the Civil Rights Acts of 1957 and 1960, but voted against the 24th Amendment to the U.S. Constitution.

Hiestand served on the U.S. House Committee on Education and Labor where he sponsored and supported revisions to the business-labor statutes.

He was an advisor to U.S. President Dwight D. Eisenhower on labor and management issues.

== Death ==
Hiestand died, age 81, in Pasadena, California; his ashes were interred at San Gabriel Cemetery in San Gabriel, California.

== Electoral history ==
1952 United States House of Representatives elections in California, 21st district
| Party | Candidate | Votes | % |
|---|---|---|---|
| Republican | Edgar W. Hiestand | 112,100 | 53.6 |
| Democratic | Everett G. Burkhalter | 97,007 | 46.4 |
| Total votes | | 209,107 | 100.0 |
| Turnout | | | |
| Republican win (new seat) | | | |

1954 United States House of Representatives elections in California, 21st district
| Party | Candidate | Votes | % |
|---|---|---|---|
| Republican | Edgar W. Hiestand (Incumbent) | 100,258 | 58.7 |
| Democratic | William E. "Bill" Roskam | 70,486 | 41.3 |
| Total votes | | 170,744 | 100.0 |
| Turnout | | | |
| Republican hold | | | |

1956 United States House of Representatives elections in California, 21st district
| Party | Candidate | Votes | % |
|---|---|---|---|
| Republican | Edgar W. Hiestand (Incumbent) | 153,679 | 62.6 |
| Democratic | W. C. "Bill" Stethem | 91,683 | 37.4 |
| Total votes | | 245,362 | 100.0 |
| Turnout | | | |
| Republican hold | | | |

1958 United States House of Representatives elections in California, 21st district
| Party | Candidate | Votes | % |
|---|---|---|---|
| Republican | Edgar W. Hiestand (Incumbent) | 127,238 | 51.9 |
| Democratic | Mrs. Rudd Brown | 118,141 | 48.1 |
| Total votes | | 245,379 | 100.0 |
| Turnout | | | |
| Republican hold | | | |

1960 United States House of Representatives elections in California, 21st district
| Party | Candidate | Votes | % |
|---|---|---|---|
| Republican | Edgar W. Hiestand (Incumbent) | 179,376 | 58.4 |
| Democratic | Mrs. Rudd Brown | 127,591 | 41.6 |
| Total votes | | 306,967 | 100.0 |
| Turnout | | | |
| Republican hold | | | |

== See also ==
- List of Dartmouth College alumni
- List of people from Chicago
- List of people from Pasadena, California
- List of United States representatives from California

U.S. House of Representatives
| Preceded by Harry R. Sheppard | Member of the U.S. House of Representatives from California's 21st congressional district 1953–1963 | Succeeded by Augustus Hawkins |
