= Francis M. Nickell =

American politician

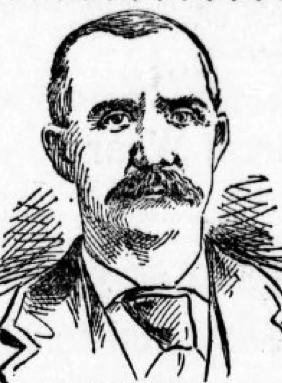
- Dromgold in 1896

Member of the Los Angeles City Council from the 1st ward
- In office December 5, 1890 – December 12, 1894
- Preceded by: H. V. Van Dusen
- Succeeded by: George W. Stockwell
- In office December 16, 1896 – December 15, 1898
- Preceded by: George W. Stockwell
- Succeeded by: William H. Pierce

Personal details
- Born: Reuben Wiger Dromgold; 1843; Kentucky, US
- Died: July 2, 1913 (aged 69–70); Los Angeles, California, US
- Political party: Democratic
- Spouse: Bettie C. Nickell
- Children: 5

Francis M. Nickell (1843–1913) was a contractor, a builder and a member of the Los Angeles City Council in the 1890s.

== Biography ==
Nickell was born about June 1843 in Kentucky, then moved to Kansas and finally to Los Angeles in 1883. He lived in Santa Monica for three years but finally moved to 228 South Fremont Avenue in Los Angeles. The Los Angeles Times reported in his obituary that "he had a finger in the laying of the present metropolis and was engaged upon many of the notable structures" of the early city. He was in business at 725 West Third Street and was president of the Wilshire Boulevard Improvement Association and a member of Sampson Lodge, Knights of Pythias, and the East Gate Masonic Lodge.

He died on July 2, 1913, leaving a widow (Bettie C. Nickell) and five children—Mrs. J.K. Hutsell, Mrs. Philo Coonradt, Mrs. A.J. Renner, G. H. Nickell and H.B. Nickell.

== City Council ==
Nickell was elected in the 1st Ward of the Los Angeles City Council for two two-year terms between 1890 and 1894 and again between 1896 and 1898. He was chairman of the committee that oversaw the construction of the Los Angeles outfall sewer into the Pacific Ocean and was also "instrumental in establishing Eastlake Park," the present Lincoln Park. Nickell was a Democrat.

== Notes and references ==
Preceded by H. V. Van Dusen	Los Angeles City Council; 1st Ward; 1890–94, 1896–98	Succeeded by George W. Stockwell and William Henry Pierce
