= William H. Pierce =

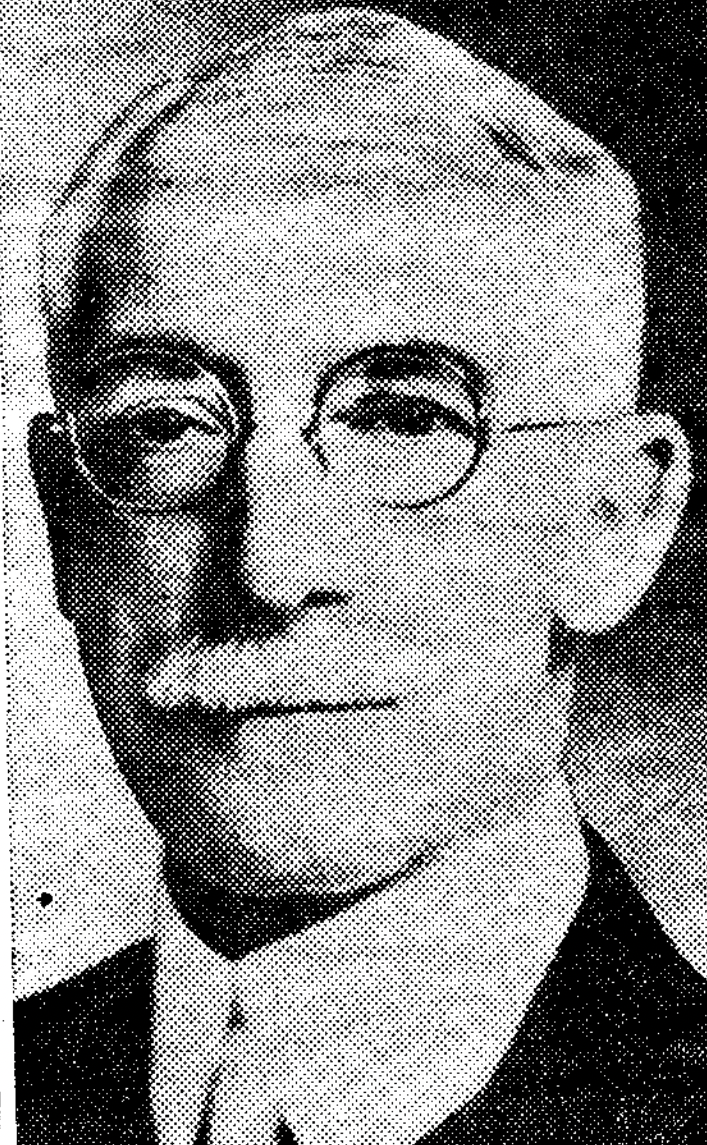

Member of the Los Angeles City Council from the 1st ward
- In office December 15, 1898 – December 5, 1902
- Preceded by: Francis M. Nickell
- Succeeded by: Owen McAleer

Personal details
- Born: William Henry Pierce; December 28, 1859 Delaware County, New York
- Died: February 24, 1939 Harvard Heights, Los Angeles

William Henry Pierce (December 28, 1859 – February 24, 1939) was a founder of Pierce Brothers Mortuary in Southern California, which at the time of his death was the second-largest funeral business in the United States. He was also a member of the Los Angeles City Council and that city's Planning Commission.

== Biography ==
Pierce was born on December 28, 1859, in Delaware County, New York, the son of James Washington Pierce of Dutchess County and Francis C. Clark of Delaware County. His brothers were C. W. Pierce, Herbert Pierce and Fred Pierce, and he had a sister, Catherine Pierce. He was married on April 15, 1886, to Mary Jane Newton of Saybrook, Connecticut. They had three children, Sterling N., Gertrude (Mrs. Hyalmar Johnson) and Helen Mary (Mrs. Harry Hum).

He attended public schools in Delaware County and graduated from Walton Academy in Walton, New York. At the age of nineteen, he was a schoolteacher for a year, then emigrated in 1880 to Sacramento, California, where he joined a brother in the grocery business. The next year he spent with another brother in Sierra Madre, California, and then ran a general store for a year at Mokelumne Hill, Calaveras County.

Moving to Los Angeles in 1885, Pierce engaged with both brothers in a furniture store and livery stable business on the Los Angeles Plaza. Later he took on raising grain and hay on Mission Road near the eastern city limits, and in 1902 all three began a mortuary business under the name of Pierce Brothers & Company. It became the second-largest mortuary in the United States.

In 1934 he owned three farms of more than 200 acres in the San Joaquin Valley and Riverside County, and he listed his hobbies as golf, farming and viticulture (grape cultivation). He was a member of the Masons, Woodmen of the World, Elks Lodge, California Country Club, City Club and Commercial Club. He was an official of the First Unitarian Church, Los Angeles, and a Republican. He was a founder of the Los Angeles Chamber of Commerce.

Pierce, whose address was 2118 South Hobart Boulevard in Harvard Heights, died on February 24, 1939, at Chase Sanitarium after an illness of "little more than a week." It was said his death was "hastened by grief over the loss of his son," Dr. Sterling Pierce, former chief of staff of California Lutheran Hospital, who had been killed three months earlier in a San Diego car crash.

Funeral services for William Pierce were held at the First Unitarian Church, and burial was on his ranch property in Hemet, California. He bequeathed most of his estate to his family, with $500 going to the First Unitarian Church.

== Public service ==
=== City Council ===
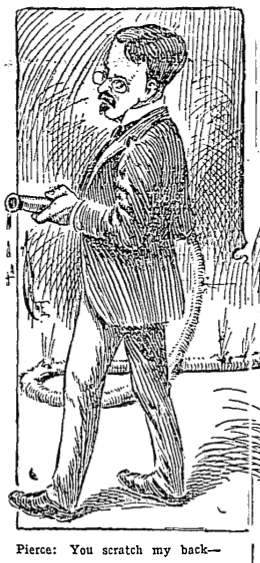
Pierce's interest in municipal water ownership was satirized in this 1902 newspaper cartoon

In 1898 Pierce was elected to the City Council from the 1st Ward in Lincoln Heights. He was reelected and served until 1903. His interests centered on the problems of the city's water supply, and he took part in the successful endeavor to establish a municipal water system, with the Los Angeles Water Department, precursor to today's Los Angeles Department of Water and Power, taking over control from private companies in 1908.

=== Commissions ===
Pierce helped organize and was president of the City Planning Commission from 1920 to 1922. The 51-member group was "an outgrowth of the City Planning Association formed primarily to prepare a program of civic improvements to create employment for returned soldiers of the World War." He was next a member of a new planning commission until 1925. He was also an organizer and president for one term of the city Traffic Commission.

Preceded by George W. Stockwell	Los Angeles City Council; 1st Ward; 1898–1902	Succeeded by Owen McAleer
