= H. V. Van Dusen =

Postmaster and American Civil War soldier

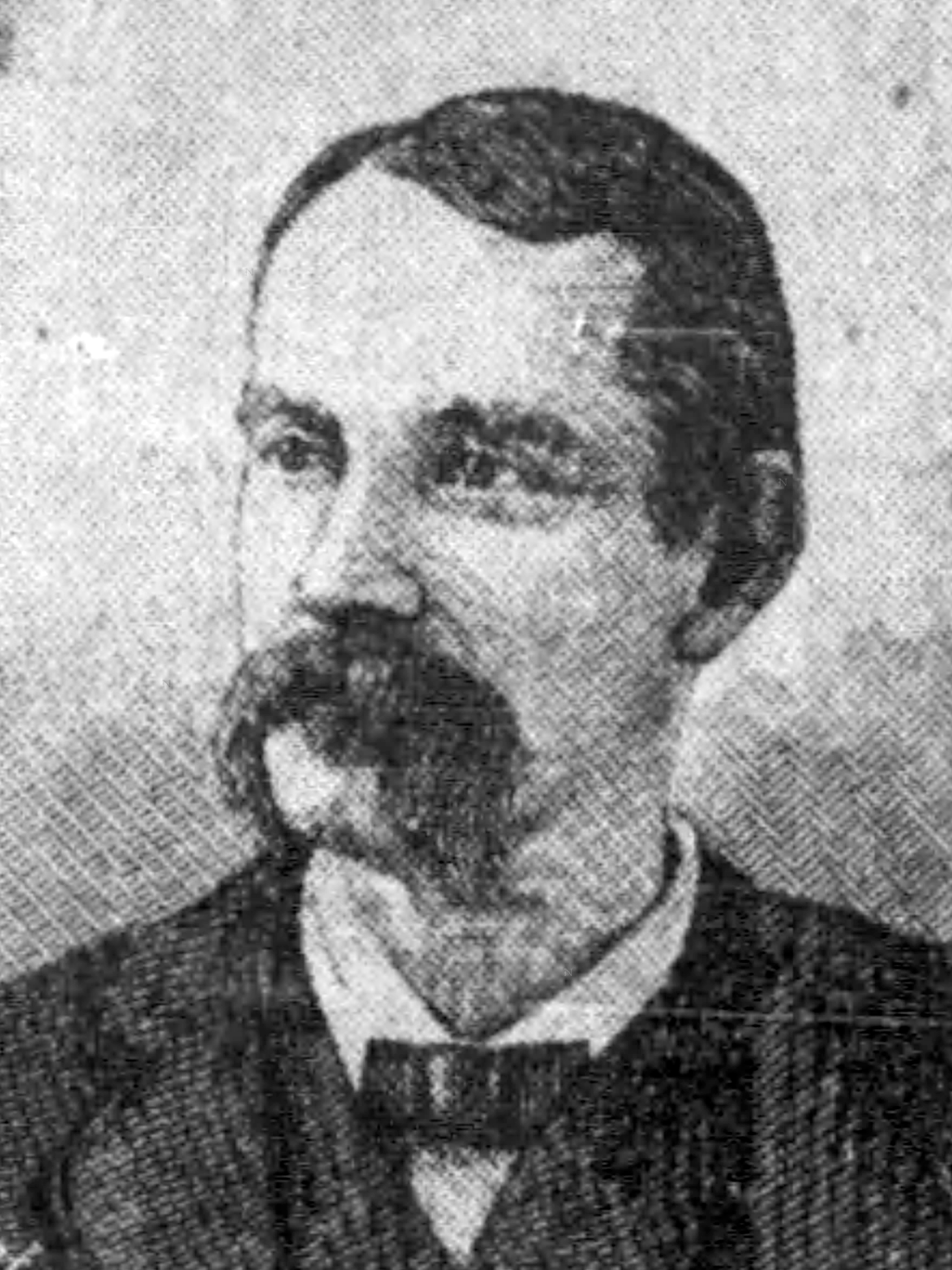

Member of the Los Angeles City Council from the 1st ward
- In office February 25, 1889 – December 5, 1890
- Preceded by: Ward established
- Succeeded by: Francis M. Nickell

Personal details
- Born: 1843 Albion, New York, U.S.
- Died: January 26, 1903 (aged 59–60) Los Angeles, California, U.S.
- Party: Republican

Henry V. Van Dusen (1843 – January 26, 1903) was the postmaster of Los Angeles, California, in the 1890s and a member of the City Council there in 1889–91.

== Military service ==
Van Dusen served on the Union side in the American Civil War, where he lost an arm in battle, and in 1887 he was a member of the Grand Army of the Republic.

== Early career ==
Van Dusen was employed "in a responsible position" for eight years in the U.S. Postal Service in Washington, D.C.

In 1888 he was one of the organizers of the California Fraternal Directory Company, which aimed to publish "complete annual directories of all the different secret orders and societies in California, with semi-annual pocket editions of the same."

== City Council ==
Van Dusen was elected to the City Council from the 1st Ward in 1889. He was criticized at a citizens' meeting on North Water Street later that year for failing to act on a petition asking the city to construct a bridge across the Arroyo Seco at Walnut Street. A delay in the city's response was later attributed to Van Dusen's illness. The councilman left office with the expiration of his term on January 5, 1891.

== Board of Trade ==
Van Dusen lived in Eastside Los Angeles, where he was a member of the Board of Trade. After his election to the City Council, the board split into two factions as the result of what a Los Angeles Times correspondent called "the reluctance on the part of some of Mr. Van Dusen's friends to allow an investigation of alleged irregularities practiced by that gentleman in securing his election." The anti-Van Dusen faction organized into a separate group to be called a Chamber of Commerce.

A letter-writer who identified himself as "East Side" replied the next day that Van Dusen had announced himself as a City Council candidate only "three or four days" before the Republican caucus and received "more than double the votes of the four other candidates combined." The writer claimed that "at least two of the defeated candidates . . . can justly be charged with all the undesirable and uncalled-for strife and dissension that have afflicted our Board of Trade for the last three months."

== Postmaster ==
After the death of Los Angeles postmaster J. W. Green on August 3, 1891, former Councilman Van Dusen was nominated to U.S. postal authorities by local U.S. Representative William W. Bowers as Green's successor. Bowers's decision took place after "one of the most hotly contested in the history of Los Angeles politics, and the final result was a complete surprise to everyone, as Mr. Van Dusen's name was not even mentioned . . . until a day before he was decided upon." He was a compromise between the candidacies of H. B. Shoulters, the deputy postmaster, and Police Commissioner Thomas A. Lewis. Van Dusen completed his bond for $100,000 on January 26, 1892, and took charge of his office on the bond's receipt in Washington. He served until 1906.

== Death ==
Van Dusen died in January 1903, and funeral services were held in the Church of the Nazarene on South Los Angeles Street with the Rev. P. F. Bresee officiating and East Side Lodge 35 of the Independent Order of Odd Fellows in charge of the ceremony. Interment was at Evergreen Cemetery.

Preceded by —	Los Angeles City Council; 1st Ward; 1889–91	Succeeded by Francis M. Nickell
