= Jim Wilson (California politician) =

American politician and banker

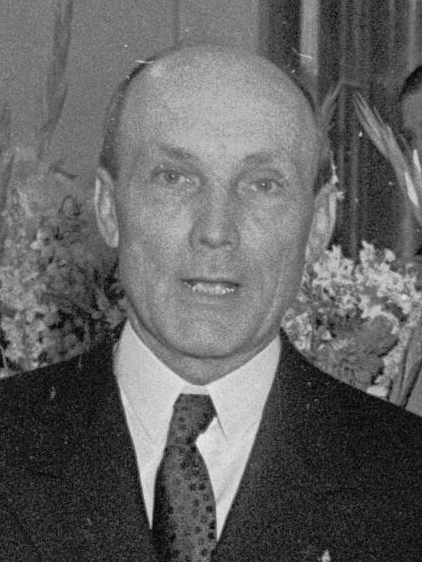
- Wilson in 1935

Member of the Los Angeles City Council for the 1st district
- In office July 1, 1933 – June 30, 1941
- Preceded by: Charles Hiram Randall
- Succeeded by: Delamere Francis McCloskey

Personal details
- Born: October 21, 1872 Butler, Ohio
- Died: February 8, 1956 (aged 83) Los Angeles, California
- Party: Republican

Jim Wilson (October 21, 1872 – February 8, 1956) was an American pioneer banker and businessman in the San Fernando Valley. A member of the Republican Party, Wilson served on the Los Angeles City Council from 1933 to 1941.

== Biography ==
Wilson was born on October 21, 1872, in Butler, Ohio, the son of John W. Wilson and Harriet Andrews, both of Butler. He studied pharmacy at Ohio Northern University in Ada, Ohio, and moved to California in 1905. He purchased the first drugstore in the San Fernando Valley in what was then known as Lankershim, now North Hollywood. In 1914 he bought a general department store that he later sold and which became Rathburn's. He was associated with the development of North Hollywood and organized the Bank of Lankershim there in 1921. Later it was the First National Bank of North Hollywood, which he sold to the California Bank. He held an interest in the Lankershim Press newspaper, from 1925 to 1933.

He was married first to Grace D. McIntyre, who died on May 15, 1925, and then to Nena Evelyn Smith, on April 7, 1926. In 1934 he was living at 11026 Kling Street, North Hollywood, in a house that he built himself on the site of "the old Lankershim Rancho, first home in the valley." He was a Christian Scientist and a Republican.

He was the first president of both the North Hollywood Rotary Club and the Lankershim or North Hollywood Chamber of Commerce, of which he was president between 1914 and 1923. He was the founder of the first Boy Scout troop in the San Fernando Valley.

Wilson died on February 8, 1956, in his home at 918 South Serrano Avenue, near Western Avenue and Olympic Boulevard, leaving his widow, Nina Sanborn Smith; a sister, Mrs. Claude Hunter, and a brother, D.L. Wilson, both of Ohio.

== Public office ==
=== City Council ===
==== Elections ====
In 1933, the Los Angeles City Council District 1 covered all the sparsely populated San Fernando Valley and the Atwater section, as well as the Los Feliz area east of Griffith Park, east of Vermont Avenue and north of Fountain Avenue. Wilson won his first election for the 1st District seat in 1933 over the incumbent, Charles Randall, by an almost 2-to-1 margin. He was reelected in 1935 and in 1937 and 1939 but lost to Delamere Francis McCloskey in 1941.

==== Positions ====
1936 Wilson appeared at a meeting of the city Police Commission, along with representatives of the Los Feliz Women's Club and the Parent-Teacher Association of the Los Feliz district, to protest the issuing of a floor-show permit for the Wigwam Cafe at 3100 Los Feliz Boulevard, saying the "activities at the Wigwam keep the neighborhood awake at nights and are a nuisance to the district."

1941 The councilman was on the losing end of a 9-5 vote when the City Council approved a spot zone to allow radio station KMPC to construct a transmitter, building and towers on the north side of Burbank Boulevard about 600 feet east of Coldwater Canyon Boulevard. Neighbors protested the look of the red-and-white towers as gigantic "barber poles."

==== Reputation ====
Wilson was said to have an "equable and agreeable temperament" on the council and was a "wheelhorse for work." When he was appointed to the Board of Public Works, a Times reporter wrote that "Wilson is regarded as a real diplomat who might be able to iron out misunderstandings that have kept the Mayor and the Council at loggerheads."

=== Board of Public Works ===
Wilson was appointed to the Board of Public Works by Mayor Fletcher Bowron in February 1943 and served until 1948. His appointment was opposed by Councilman Parley Parker Christensen because Christensen believed that Wilson might have voted in favoring of reimbursing Councilman G. Vernon Bennett for gasoline and oil he used in supposedly illegally driving a city car to Vancouver, B.C. Bennett issued a statement denying the charge.

=== Public transit ===
In 1951 Wilson was secretary of an "engineering corporation" that was planning the construction of a monorail rapid-transit system between Long Beach and the San Fernando Valley via Downtown and the Los Angeles River. He told a reporter that "Monorail trains will attain speeds up to 100 miles an hour and, counting station stops, should average better than 40 miles an hour."

At the time of his death in 1956, he was secretary of the Los Angeles Metropolitan Transit Authority.

| Preceded by Charles Randall | Los Angeles City Council; 1st District; 1933–41 | Succeeded by Delamere Francis McCloskey |
