= Owen McAleer =

American politician

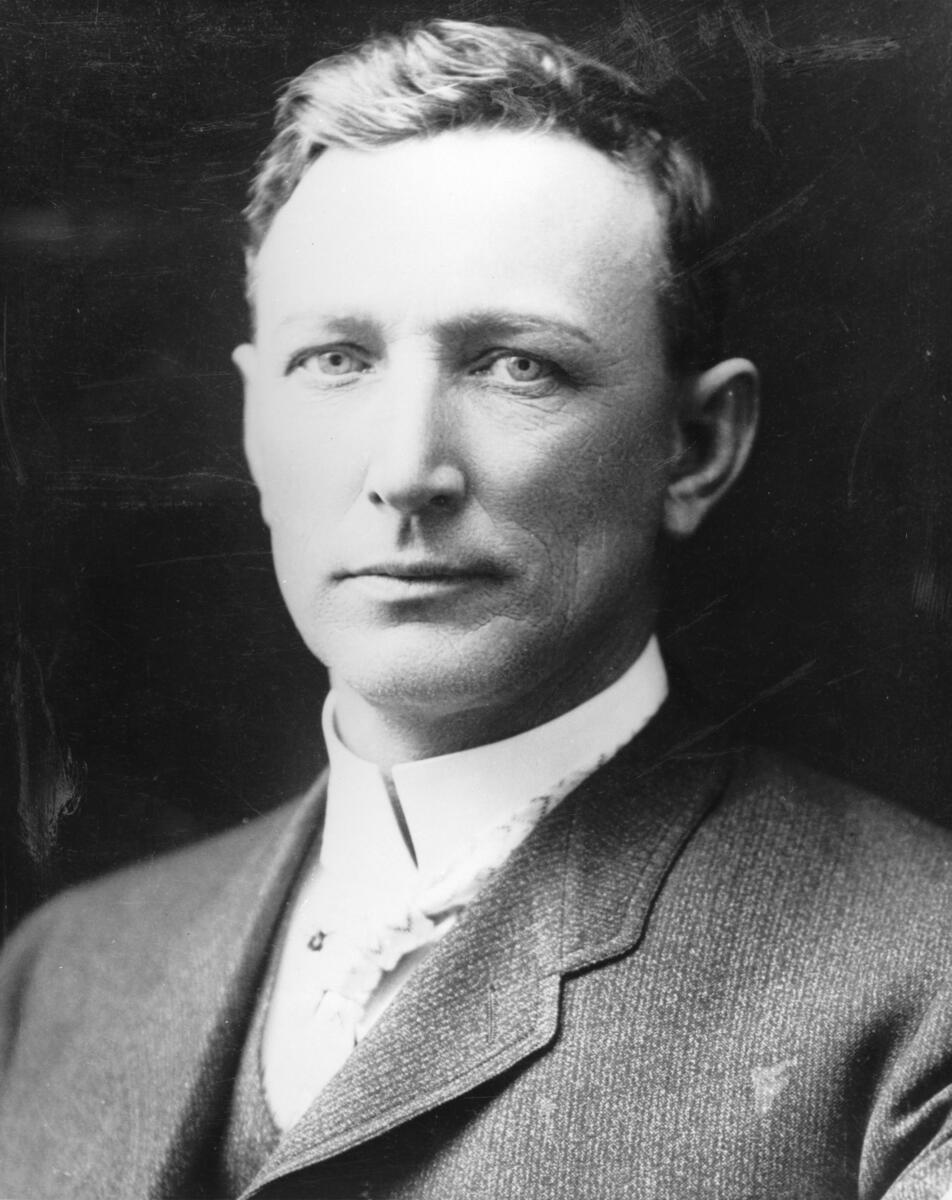

25th Mayor of Los Angeles
- In office December 8, 1904 – December 13, 1906
- Preceded by: Meredith P. Snyder
- Succeeded by: Arthur C. Harper

Member of the Los Angeles City Council from the 1st ward
- In office December 5, 1902 – December 8, 1904
- Preceded by: William H. Pierce
- Succeeded by: Fred L. Ford

Personal details
- Born: February 3, 1858 Lessard, Canada West (now Ontario, Canada)
- Died: March 7, 1944 (aged 86) Los Angeles, California, US
- Party: Republican
- Spouses: Rebecca B. Wanchope (m. 1891; died 1893) Gertrude E. Mullaly (m. 1898)

Owen McAleer (February 3, 1858 – March 7, 1944) was a Los Angeles, California, businessman who was mayor of the city between 1904 and 1906. His brother Jimmy McAleer played in Major League Baseball.

== Personal ==
McAleer was born on February 3, 1858, in Leskard, then in Canada West, the son of Owen McAleer of Ireland and Mary Miller of England. In 1863 the family moved to Youngstown, Ohio, where the elder McAleer died in 1865, leaving a wife and eight children, the youngest just 6 months old.

In 1888 he moved to Los Angeles, and on January 8, 1891, he and Rebecca B. Wanchope of Ireland were married. She died on August 4, 1893, at the age of 29. He married again, on April 5, 1898, to Gertrude E. Mullaly of Covington, Kentucky, when he was 40 and she was 28.

He became a citizen of the United States on May 15, 1896, and in 1897 he was on the board of directors of the 150-member East Side Cycling Club, with its clubhouse at 163 South Avenue 21 in today's Lincoln Heights.

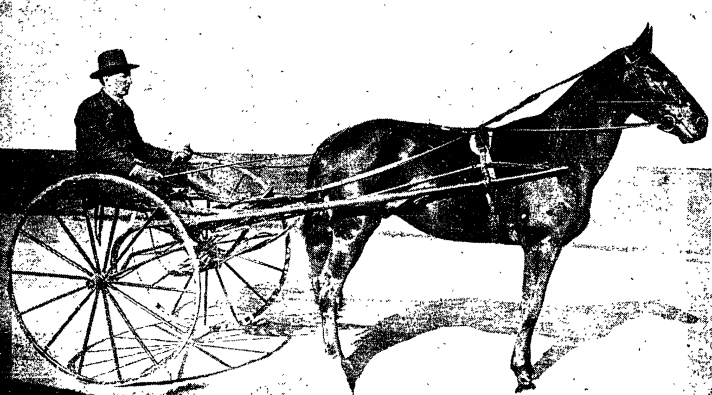
McAleer and Checkers, 1905

He owned and trained driving horses (in 1905 he had five of them) and rode them "on a sort of private speedway of his own, near Eastlake Park." He pushed the sport for others, too, and as mayor he set aside a stretch of West Washington Street for a mile west of Western Avenue for use by "drivers who delight in vying with each other off the racetrack," and, according to the Los Angeles Times, "policemen have been given to understand that some latitude be allowed horsemen there."

An automobile driven by Mayor McAleer struck and injured Charles Hughes, a delivery boy on a bicycle, on Central Avenue at Ninth Street the afternoon of July 17, 1906. Three witnesses said that in their opinion the vehicle was exceeding the speed limit and that "in approaching the corner no warning was given by tooting the horn, and that the occupants made no effort to assist the little fellow in any way." Called to the location by the boy's employer, "a stormy scene ensued," but McAleer "finally agreed to consider a bill for the repair of the bicycle."

In 1935 the McAleers were living at 3817 South Main Street in today's Historic South Central.

McAleer died on March 7, 1944, leaving his wife, Gertrude McAleer of 401 West 41st Street, and a nephew, J.C. McAleer. A funeral service was held under the auspices of B.P.O.E, Lodge 99, with cremation following.

== Vocation ==
=== Private business ===
After McAleer's father died, "There was no money for schooling and Owen began his business career as a small boy in the boiler works of W. B. Pollock."

McAleer built the first steam boiler in Los Angeles. He became superintendent of the boiler works of the pioneer Baker Iron Works, resigning in September 1905 after he had become mayor. He then organized the Republic Iron & Steel Co., with Nat Wilshire. McAleer was vice president and general manager.

After leaving the mayor's office, he returned to private business, retiring in 1914 when Republic Iron & Steel was dissolved.

=== Government service ===
He was on a committee to investigate the feasibility of bringing water from the Owens River to Los Angeles and was a member of the committee that obtained the first land options in the Owens River Valley that led the project's fulfillment. He was a City Council member from the 1st Ward in 1902–04, mayor in 1904-06 and on the Board of Public Works in 1916–20. As mayor he was credited with establishing the first municipal playground — on Violet Street. McAleer was elected mayor on the Republican ticket on December 5, 1904, ousting Meredith P. Snyder, a Democrat.

Among his accomplishments was the purchase of Sycamore Grove Park by the city.
