= Louis R. Nowell =

American politician (1915–2009)

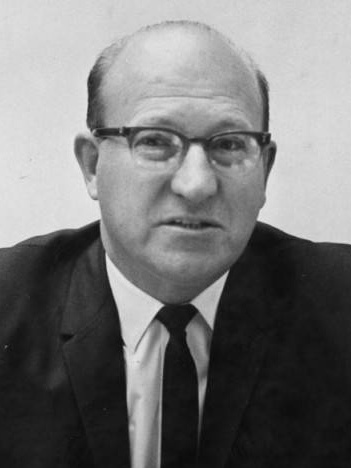
- Nowell in 1963

Member of the Los Angeles City Council from the 1st district
- In office January 28, 1963 – June 30, 1977
- Preceded by: Everett G. Burkhalter
- Succeeded by: Bob Ronka

Personal details
- Born: February 8, 1915 Salt Lake City, Utah, U.S.
- Died: July 2, 2009 (aged 94) Bellingham, Washington, U.S.
- Party: Democratic
- Spouse: Maxine Barlow
- Relatives: Bradley Nowell (grandson)
- Occupation: Politician; firefighter

Louis R. Nowell (February 8, 1915 – July 2, 2009) was a fireman and politician in Los Angeles, California. He was best known for serving on the Los Angeles City Council from the San Fernando Valley from 1963 to 1977. He was appointed as a member of the South Coast Regional Coastal Commission.

A self-described political conservative, Nowell favored high-density growth in residential areas and related development. He opposed school busing to achieve racial integration, believing that families should be able to choose where their children went to school. Investigated for some financial irregularities related to his public office, Nowell pleaded no contest and was fined for a violation of a campaign-reporting law.

He was the grandfather of Bradley Nowell, the singer and the guitarist of the band Sublime.

== Biography ==
Nowell was born February 8, 1915, in Salt Lake City, Utah, one of twelve children in the family of Oliver and Minnie Gordon Nowell, both of Salt Lake City. His father, a blacksmith, died when Louis was ten years old, and his mother brought him and two siblings to Los Angeles in 1931. He went to Franklin High School and to Los Angeles City College, where he majored in mechanical engineering. At one point Nowell learned the building trade and was superintendent for construction of "several hundred" homes in Hawaii.

At age 25, Nowell joined the Los Angeles Fire Department in 1940. He served there for 23 years, rising to the rank of captain and being elected president of the 8,500-member Fire and Police Protective League.

He was married on April 20, 1941, to Maxine Barlow of Mason City, Iowa. They had three children, Julie, Jim and John, and since 1945 lived at 10205 Scoville Avenue in the Sunland district of the northeast San Fernando Valley.

Nowell was said to wear a "conservative label proudly." A Los Angeles Times reporter wrote of him:

Without the university degrees that open doors to executive positions, winning his way from a 65 cents a day job thinning sugar beets in Utah to election to City Council . . . is a plus in any man's memoirs.

Nowell died on July 2, 2009, in Camarillo, California. but his death was not announced by his family in Los Angeles until July 23. No cause of death was given. Memorial donations were suggested to the Widows, Orphans and Disabled Firemen's Fund of Los Angeles.

== City Council ==
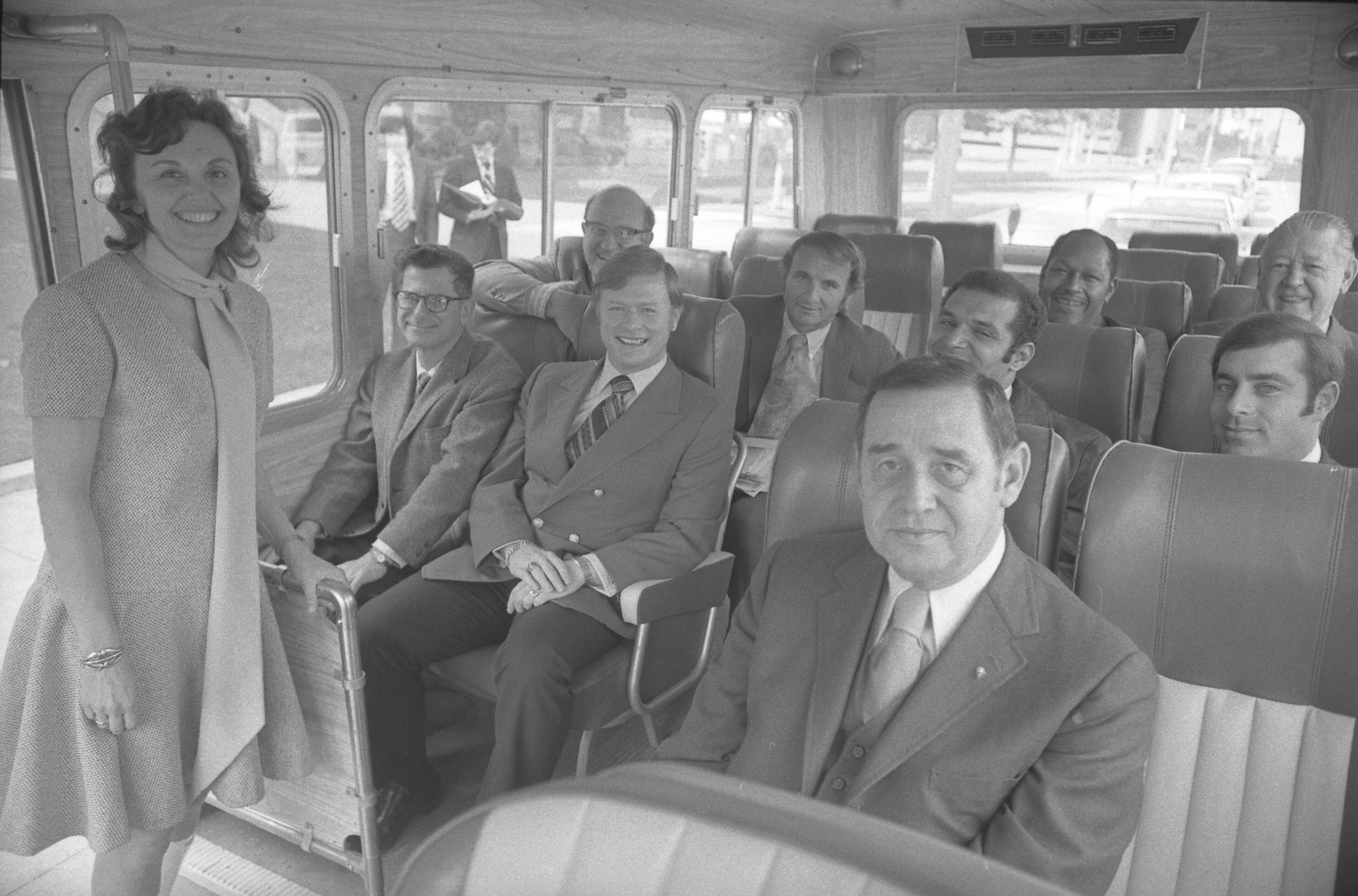
Nowell (back row, far left) with City Council members in 1972.

=== Elections ===
Nowell was a candidate for Los Angeles City Council District 1 in 1963 to succeed Everett G. Burkhalter; he placed second in the April primary to attorney Phill Silver. He won in the June final. He was easily reelected in 1965, but in 1969 he polled just 54% of the vote in the primary. He had a strong opponent that year in Jim Keysor, who polled 18% of the vote and went on to be elected to the State Assembly.

During his time in office, Nowell supported more residential development, as Southern California was continuing to attract new residents. In 1977 he led an effort to formally opposed forced school busing in Los Angeles to achieve racial integration, believing that parents wanted the choice of where their children went to school, with most preferring their own neighborhoods.

In 1973 Nowell was subject to a forceful opposition campaign led by Gerald and Betty Decter (below), who sent out thousands of anti-Nowell brochures and fliers to District 1 voters. The councilman complained that "hundreds of young people" had come from outside the district to work against him. Nevertheless, Nowell won in the primary by a 54% vote.

In an emotional speech to the City Council (below, Quotations), he announced in 1976 that he would not run for reelection the next year. "His voice broke, and he appeared to be near tears." Instead, he was a candidate for city controller, coming in third.

=== Highlights ===
- Adobe. Nowell was named California Legislator of the Year in June 1968 by the Conference of California Societies for his "inspired leadership" in saving the historic Andres Pico Adobe in Mission Hills from destruction. He had persuaded the City Council to allocate $175,000 to buy the structure.
- Busing. Nowell led a successful drive for the City Council to go on record in opposition to mandatory busing to achieve desegregation in city schools. The council passed the resolution by an 8–4 vote but not until Nowell and black City Councilman Dave Cunningham stood "nose-to-nose" and "appeared to verge on fisticuffs." "You are the greatest racist in this world," Cunningham shouted at Nowell during a recess in the meeting. Nowell told reporters later: "The majority of citizens—black, brown and white—don't want their children in forced busing. . . . Voluntarily, yes. Forcefully, hell no!" Mayor Tom Bradley later proposed a "peace conference" between the two; Cunningham accepted but Nowell did not. The next day, Nowell proposed a motion of censure against Cunningham. It was referred to a committee when it got only three favorable votes to suspend the rules and consider it—from Nowell, Don Lorenzen and Robert M. Wilkinson.
- Coastal Commission. The appointment by Council President John S. Gibson, Jr. of Nowell as the city's representative on the newly formed South Coast Regional Coastal Commission drew fire from conservationists. Both Gibson and Nowell had opposed the commission's formation. The City Council voted to assume authority over Nowell in casting votes on the commission, but the action was ruled invalid and unenforceable by the assistant city attorney. In one of his early votes, he came down against "the environmental side, voting against trying to stop drilling by the Occidental Petroleum Corp. in Pacific Palisades."
- Development. Nowell had a reputation as "probably the most developer-oriented member of the City Council" in that he "persistently supported higher density development and the zoning changes necessary to achieve it both in his own district and in the city as a whole."

==== Decters ====
It was said that Nowell was led to resign from the council by the decade-long work of one husband-wife couple, Jerry and Betty Decter, who lived at 2054 North Beverly Drive in the Beverly Crest district and who first fought the councilman over his support of a 1968 plan to realign Beverly Drive between the San Fernando Valley and Beverly Hills. Columnist Al Martinez of the Los Angeles Times wrote of the Decters in 1977:

With little help and with a dedication rare among private citizens, they pursued Nowell for a decade, and in the end brought him down with a series of revelations that reduced the once powerful legislator to tears. The Decters spent thousands of dollars of their own money and thousands of hours of their time to end the 14-year career of a man who had towered over civic affairs.

Colleagues said the couple "hounded Nowell into becoming a tense, distrustful and people-hating man." Council President John S. Gibson, Jr. said: "He got to dislike people. He began thinking everyone was against him and that he couldn't trust anyone." Councilman Zev Yaroslavsky said: "Louie was driving himself out of office. Not a week went by that he didn't refer to the Decters." As for Nowell, he said: "I'm getting sick and tired of them picking on me."

Jerry Decter died on June 24, 2009, eight days before Nowell.

==== Schooner ====
Nowell and his family purchased a 51-foot or 57-foot schooner named Sharolyn or Sharon in Hawaii and, with eight relatives, sailed it in 1972 from the islands to San Pedro. The 33-day crossing was rough, and most of the people aboard were seasick. The boat was out of contact for 24 days until it was sighted by a Japanese freighter, and it arrived in Santa Barbara with just five gallons of fuel left.

In 1974 Jerry and Betty Decter had been wondering how a city councilman could afford the cost of maintaining the schooner. They and a colleague, Warren Kessler, found through public records that Nowell had been receiving a 50% discount in a Marina del Rey boat slip owned by a real estate developer who had received approval by Nowell on the City Council on a controversial condominium project in Long Beach. The Decters charged that Nowell had failed to comply with financial laws by declaring the discount as a gift. Nowell and the developer, Jona Goldrich, denied any impropriety.

The Decters learned that Nowell had docked his schooner at a city pier in the Port of Los Angeles, but not paid a cent for doing so. A Los Angeles Times investigation found that Nowell had also been receiving services by Harbor Department employees aboard his yacht. He was subsequently billed $7,920 by the city, offered to settle for $480 and eventually paid $2,000.

After his retirement, Nowell and his wife moved first to Kernville in Kern County and then to Marina Del Rey, where they lived aboard their schooner. Nowell announced in 1980 that he was putting the vessel on the market for $170,000.

==== Misdemeanor ====
Nowell was fined $500 and placed on a year's probation in 1974 for failing to properly report $19,700 received in a 1972 fund-raising dinner aboard the Queen Mary in Long Beach. He had listed the money in a campaign-contribution report as funds contributed by himself rather than as contributions from supporters. Gerald and Betty Decter filed the original report on this issue to law-enforcement agencies.

==== Puerto Vallarta ====
Betty and Jerry Decter, with Warren Kessler, asked District Attorney John Van de Kamp to charge Nowell and the Pacific Outdoor Advertising Company with corrupt practices for Nowell's accepting room, food and beverages for him and his wife "at the fashionable Hotel Playa de Bucerias" in Puerto Vallarta, Mexico. After he took the trips, Nowell voted against a city measure to control billboards. Nowell confirmed the fact and said that Foster and Kleiser, another billboard agency, had paid the couple's air fare. He said he did not regard the payments as a bribe and that he would take such a trip again, "Only next time I'd insist that they send me to South America and make a big trip out of it instead of a little hop to Puerto Vallarta."

== See also ==
- The Stentorians Arnett Hartsfield Jr. Firefighter LAFD 1940–1961

Preceded by Everett G. Burkhalter	Los Angeles City Council; 1st District; 1963–77	Succeeded by Bob Ronka
