= George W. Stockwell =

George W. Stockwell (March 29, 1854 – August 28, 1940) was a Los Angeles, California, grocer who was a member of the City Council there from 1894 to 1896, after which he served on the city's Fire Commission.

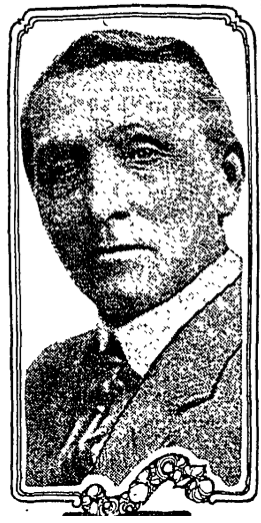
Stockwell

== Biography ==
=== Early life and career ===
Stockwell was born March 29, 1854, in Eddyville, Iowa, the son of James W. Stockwell and Delilah H. Harper, both of Ohio. He was married to Martha Jane Frederick on October 13, 1880, and after she died in 1900 he married Adele Neel on December 30, 1903. He had a brother, W.W. Stockwell; a son. Ralph F Stockwell, and a daughter, Edna D. Stockwell. He was a retail grocer between 1885 and 1912, when he retired. In 1892-93 he was grand master of the Independent Order of Odd Fellows in California.

He came to Los Angeles in 1885 and was "recognized as a figure in financial circles," being one of the heaviest stockholders in Consolidated Los Angeles Builders.

=== Accident, incapacity and death ===
During the Grand Lodge session of the Odd Fellows organization in 1916, Stockwell volunteered to use his automobile to entertain visiting officials. He was severely injured when the vehicle went into motion while he was trying to start it at Third and Main streets. The Los Angeles Times reported: that "The unfortunate man endeavored to crank the machine, having forgotten to set the emergency brake, when it lurched forward and passed over his body. . . . Attending surgeons say he sustained a fracture of the spine, a broken rib and internal injuries." A policeman "jumped on a streetcar and overtook the runaway machine which held its course south on Main street. He jumped from the [street]car into the automobile and before he could bring it to a stop it had crashed into a heavy truck, wrecking the light machine."

Doctors at Good Samaritan Hospital said that Stockwell was not expected to live, but he survived, though the expense of his treatment rendered him "almost entirely impoverished." The California Odd Fellows organization organized a "monster benefit entertainment" program of music, vaudeville and dancing on his behalf in the Shrine Auditorium in 1916. He remained an invalid until he died at the age of 86 on August 28, 1940, in his home at 4806 South Gramercy Place in today's Vermont Square district.

== Public service ==
Stockwell, a Republican, was elected to the Los Angeles City Council in 1894, defeating the incumbent Democrat, Francis M. Nickell, but he was in turn defeated by Nickell in 1896. While on the council he was noted as a firm supporter of establishing a Los Angeles Harbor in San Pedro as opposed to an alternative proposal to build it at Santa Monica

He was appointed to the city Fire Commission by Mayor George Alexander in 1910 and served until 1913.

Preceded by Francis M. Nickell	Los Angeles City Council; 1st Ward; 1894–96	Succeeded by Francis M. Nickell
