= Edmund Jaeger =

American biologist (1887–1983)

Edmund C. Jaeger
- Born: January 28, 1887; Loup City, Nebraska, U.S.
- Died: August 2, 1983 (aged 96); Riverside, California, U.S.
- Resting place: Edmund Jaeger Nature Sanctuary; Chuckwalla Mountains (ashes scattered); 33.68696°N 115.44415°W
- Education: Occidental College
- Known for: Hibernation of common poorwill
- Awards: Honorary Doctor of Science, Occidental College (1953); Phi Beta Kappa, Occidental College Chapter (1962); Professor Emeritus, Riverside City College (1965); Honorary Doctor of Laws, University of California, Riverside (1967); Member, University of California Chapter of Sigma Xi (1966)
- Scientific career
- Fields: Biology
- Workplaces: Riverside City College; Riverside Municipal Museum
- Author abbrev. (botany): E.Jaeger

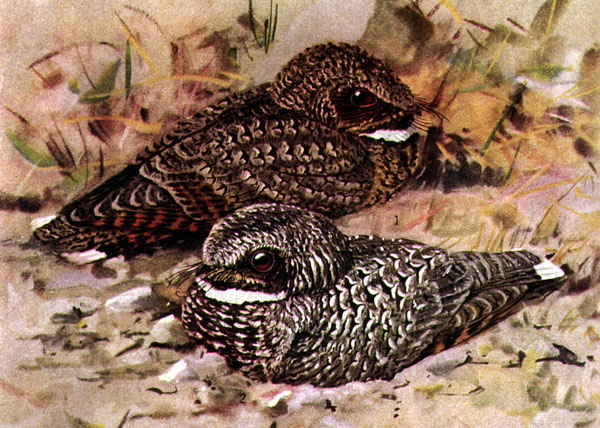
Edmund Jaeger documented a state of near-hibernation in the common poorwill.

Edmund Carroll Jaeger, D.Sc., (January 28, 1887 – August 2, 1983) was an American biologist known for his works on desert ecology. He was born in Loup City, Nebraska to Katherine (née Gunther) and John Philip Jaeger, and moved to Riverside, California in 1906 with his family. He was the first to document, in The Condor, a state of extended torpor, approaching hibernation, in a bird, the common poorwill. He also described this in the National Geographic Magazine.

== Life ==
Jaeger first attended the newly relocated Occidental College in Eagle Rock, Los Angeles (in 1914), but moved to Palm Springs in 1915, where he taught at the one-room schoolhouse. At Palm Springs he met artist Carl Eytel, and authors J. Smeaton Chase and Charles Francis Saunders. These men formed what University of Arizona Professor Peter Wild called a "Creative Brotherhood" that lived in Palm Springs in the early 20th century. Other Brotherhood members included cartoonist and painter Jimmy Swinnerton, author George Wharton James, and photographers Fred Payne Clatworthy and Stephen H. Willard. The men lived near each other (like Jaeger, Eytel built his own cabin), traveled together throughout the Southwest, helped with each other's works, and exchanged photographs which appeared in their various books. He then returned to Occidental to complete his degree in 1918 and started teaching at Riverside Junior College. Retiring from teaching after 30 years, he worked the Riverside Municipal Museum in Riverside. During all these years Jaeger used his Palm Springs cabin for his research trips across the desert. Throughout his career he wrote many popular nature books and became known as the "dean of the California deserts".

== Works ==
=== Books ===
(Listed in order of first publication.)

- The Mountain Trees of Southern California: a Simple Guide-book for Tree Lovers. Nabu Press. 2010 [1919]. p. 132. ISBN 978-1177055239. LCCN 21001210. OCLC 8666171. "Carl Eytel...furnished the sketches of the mountain animals."
- Denizens of the Desert: A Book of Southwestern Mammals, Birds, and Reptiles. Boston and New York: Houghton Mifflin Co. 1922. pp. 299. OCLC 1459267.
- A Preliminary Report on the Flora of the Charleston Mountains of Nevada. Occasional papers of Riverside Junior College., v. 1, no. 1. Riverside, CA: The Junior College. 1927. p. 15. OCLC 5663721.
- Birds of the Charleston Mountains of Nevada. Occasional papers of Riverside Junior College., v. 2, no. 1. Riverside, CA: The Junior College. 1927. p. 8. OCLC 16016140.
- Denizens of the Mountains. Springfield, IL: Charles C. Thomas. 1929. p. 168. ASIN B00085C1KE. OCLC 716567.
- A Dictionary of Greek and Latin Combining Forms used in Zoological Names (revised and enlarged from 1930 ed.). Springfield, IL: Charles C. Thomas. 1931. ASIN B002AQF1BU. OCLC 10567568.
- The California Deserts: A Visitor's Handbook (also 1933, 1938, 1955 ed.). Stanford, CA: Stanford University Press. 1965. p. 220. ISBN 978-0804712231. OCLC 716807042. (Samuel Stillman Berry and Malcom Jennings Rogers contributed chapters)
- Desert Wild Flowers. Stanford, CA: Stanford University Press. 1978 [1940]. ISBN 978-0804703659. OCLC 631689191.
- A Source-book of Biological Names and Terms (3rd ed.). Springfield, IL: Charles C. Thomas. 1978 [1944]. p. 323. ISBN 978-0398061791. OCLC 1524400. (illustrations by Merle Gish and the author)
- Our Desert Neighbors. Stanford, CA: Stanford University Press. 1950. p. 329. ISBN 978-1121357754. OCLC 1436846.
- A Source-book of Medical Terms. Springfield, IL: Charles C. Thomas. 1953. ASIN B000L3JHR8. OCLC 14670855. (Irvine H. Page was a co-author)
- The Desert in Pictures. Palm Springs, CA: Palm Springs Museum. 1955. p. 42. OCLC 9932064. (editor)
- A Naturalist's Death Valley (5th ed.). Palm Desert, CA: Death Valley '49ers, Inc. 1979 [1957]. p. 70. ASIN B0007FK6VQ. OCLC 6573909.
- The North American Deserts. Stanford, CA: Stanford University Press. 1957. pp. 320. ISBN 978-0804704984. OCLC 630598569. (Peveril Meigs contributed a chapter; illustrations by John D. Briggs, Lloyd Mason Smith, Morris Van Dame, and Jaeger )
- The Biologist's Handbook of Pronunciations (first in 1960 ed.). Charleston, SC: Nabu Press. 2011. p. 340. ISBN 978-1175764539. OCLC 310096649. (illustrations by Morris Van Dame and Jaeger)
- Desert Wildlife (revised and enlarged of 1950 Our Desert Neighbors ed.). Stanford, CA: Stanford University Press. 1961. p. 320. ISBN 978-0804701242. OCLC 637075718.
- Introduction to the Natural History of Southern California (first as 1966 ed.). University of California Press. 1977. pp. 104. ISBN 978-0520032453. OCLC 22526487. (Arthur Clayton Smith was a co-author; illustrations by Gene M. Christman)

=== Articles ===
Jaeger contributed to over 25 magazines and journals including:

- The Advent Review and Sabbath Herald
- The Auk
- Cactus and Succulent Journal
- Calico Print
- The Condor
- Desert Magazine
- Fremontia
- Journal of Mammalogy
- National Geographic Magazine
- Pacific Union Recorder
- St. Nicholas Magazine
- The Youth's Instructor

==== History of Palm Springs ====
- "Art in a Desert Cabin". Desert Magazine. 11 (11): 15–19. September 1948.
- "Forgotten Trails". Palm Springs Villager. 4 (2): 12–13, 28. September 1949.
- "Monk of Palm Springs". Palm Springs Villager. 4 (6): 22. January 1950.
- "From Cheese to Cash". Palm Springs Villager. 5 (87): 18–19, 38. February 1951.
- "I Well Remember J. Smeaton Chase". Palm Springs Villager. 6 (8): 54–56, 58. March 1952.
- "Tall Tales from Old Palm Springs". Palm Springs Villager. 6 (11): 14, 33. June 1952.

=== Archives of Jaeger's work ===
- Much of Jaeger's original work is archived at the University of California, Riverside, Library Special Collections.
- Also see: Manuscripts and correspondence, OCLC 44935014 (Summary: biographical material, list of publications, newspapers articles and correspondence of Edmund C. Jaeger, Head of the Zoology Dept. at Riverside City College. 358 items in one box)

== Honors ==
- The "Edmund C. Jaeger Desert Institute" on the Moreno Valley College (MVC) of the Riverside Community College District is named in his honor. MVC also offers an "Edmund C. Jaeger Endowed Scholarship".
- In 1986 The Nature Conservancy completed development of the "Edmund C. Jaeger Nature Sanctuary" in the Chuckwalla Mountains near Desert Center, California. It was in the Chuckwalla Mountains that Jaeger discovered the poorwill, and after his death in 1983, his cremated remains were scattered in the same canyon.
- The University of La Verne of La Verne, California, Cultural and Natural History Collections (formerly the Jaeger Museum), maintains personal and professional materials pertaining to the life of Edmund C. Jaeger, including his 1947 field notes recording his initial study of the common poorwill in hibernation. The Collections is located inside the Jaeger House, named in his honor.
- Pacific Union College of Angwin, California, annually presents an "Edmund C. Jaeger Award" in biology and "Dr. Edmund C. Jaeger Scholarship Grant" in education to deserving students.
- Designated as a Fellow of the California Native Plant Society in 1976.
- Received the Auld Lang Syne Award from Occidental College in 1982.

=== Patronyms ===
Some 28 patronyms of Jaeger have been made, including:

- Angiospermae (flowering plants)
  - Monocotyledon (single cotyledon (seed-leaf))
    - Yucca brevifolia – subspecies jaegeriana (the Jaeger Joshua tree)
  - Dicotyledons (two cotyledons (seed-leaves))
    - Astragalus jaegerianus (Lane Mountain milkvetch)
    - Astragalus pachypus – variety jaegeri (Jaeger's bush milkvetch)
    - Hesperidanthus jaegeri – synonyms: Thelypodium jaegeri and Caulostramina jaegeri (cliffdweller)
    - Draba jaegeri (a variety of whitlow-grass)
    - Eriogonum nodosum – variety jaegeri (wild buckwheat)
    - Eriogonum plumatella – variety jaegeri (yucca buckwheat)
    - Euphorbia jaegeri (Orocopia Mountain spurge)
    - Gilia jaegeri (gilia)
    - Helianthus jaegeri – synonym Helianthus annuus – subspecies jaegeri (sunflower)
    - Ivesia jaegeri (Jaeger's mousetail or Jaeger's ivesia)
    - Lupinus jaegerianus (lupin or lupines)
    - Penstemon thompsoniae – subspecies jaegeri (Jaeger's beardtongue)
    - Phacelia perityloides – subspecies jaegeri (Panamint Phacelia)
    - Potentilla jaegeri (a typical cinquefoil)
    - Ribes nevadense – variety jaegeri (Sierra currant and mountain pink currant)
    - Sisymbrium diffusus – subspecies jaegeri (mustard family)
- Insecta
  - Hemiptera (true bugs)
    - Nidicola jaegeri (minute pirate bugs or flower bugs)
    - Triatoma rubida jaegeri (a type of assassin bug)
  - Lepidoptera (moths and butterflies)
    - Schinia jaegeri – synonym Chlorocleptria jaegeri (moth)
  - Diplopoda (millipedes)
    - Gosichelus jaegeri
    - Onychelus jaegeri
- Mollusca
  - Pulmonata (land snails)
    - Helminthoglypta jaegeri
    - Oreohelix handi jaegeri

Patronyms

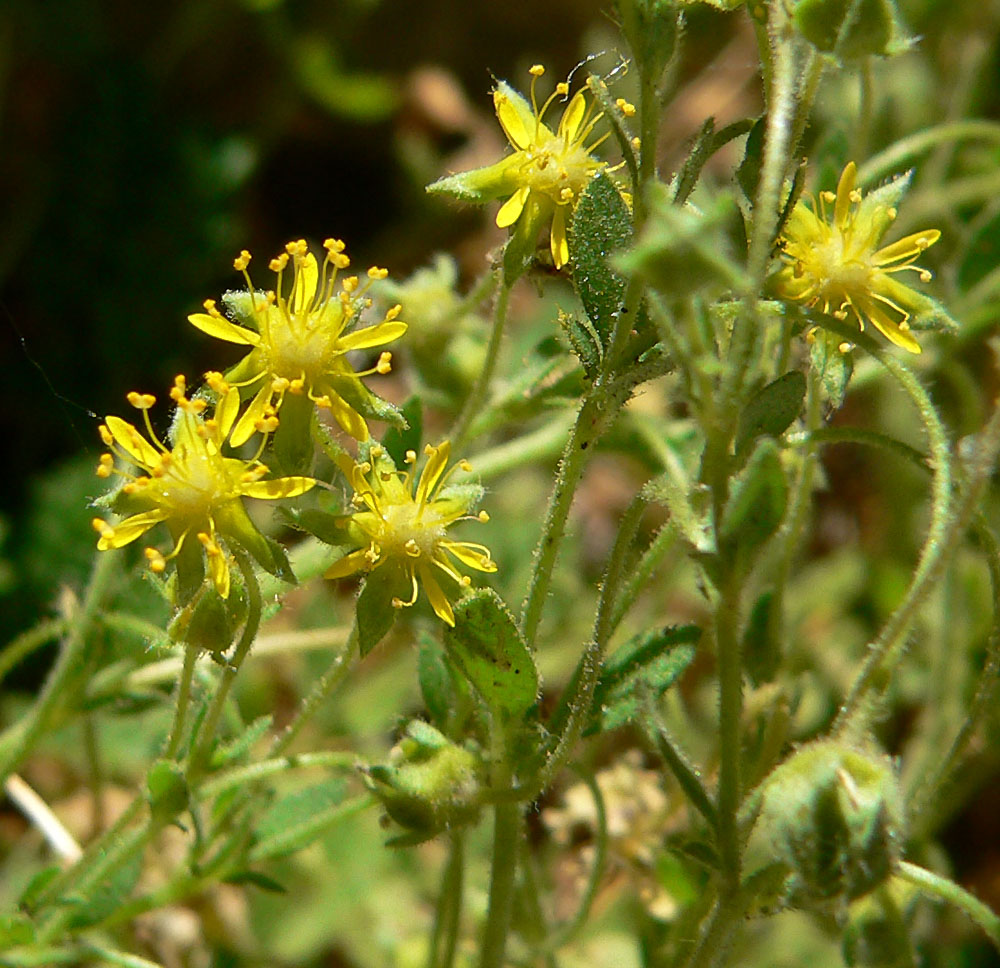
Ivesia jaergi (Jaeger's mousetail or Jaeger's ivesia)

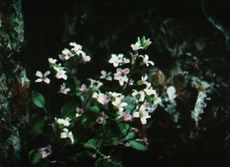
Caulostramina jaegeri (cliffdweller)

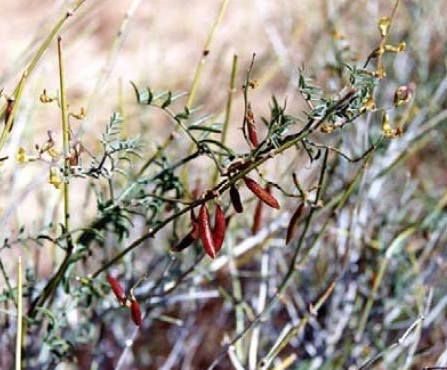
Astragalus jaegerianus (Lane Mountain milkvetch)

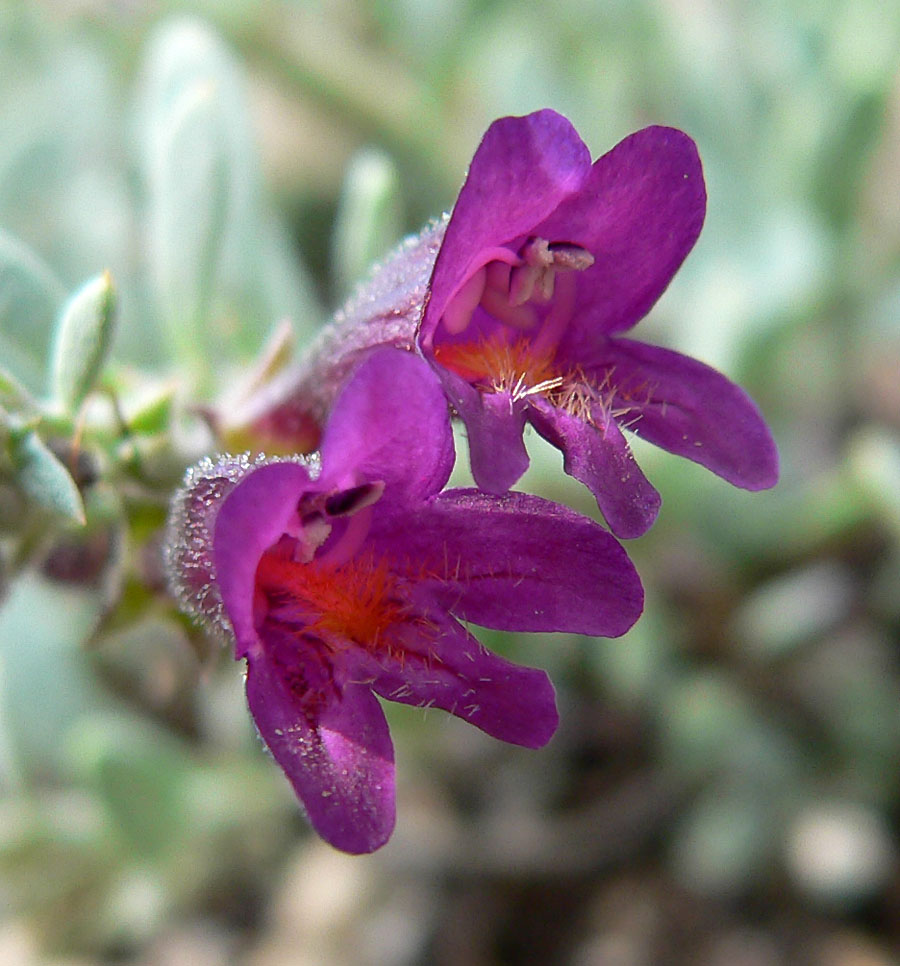
Penstemon thomsoniae subspecies jaegeri (Jaeger's beardtongue)

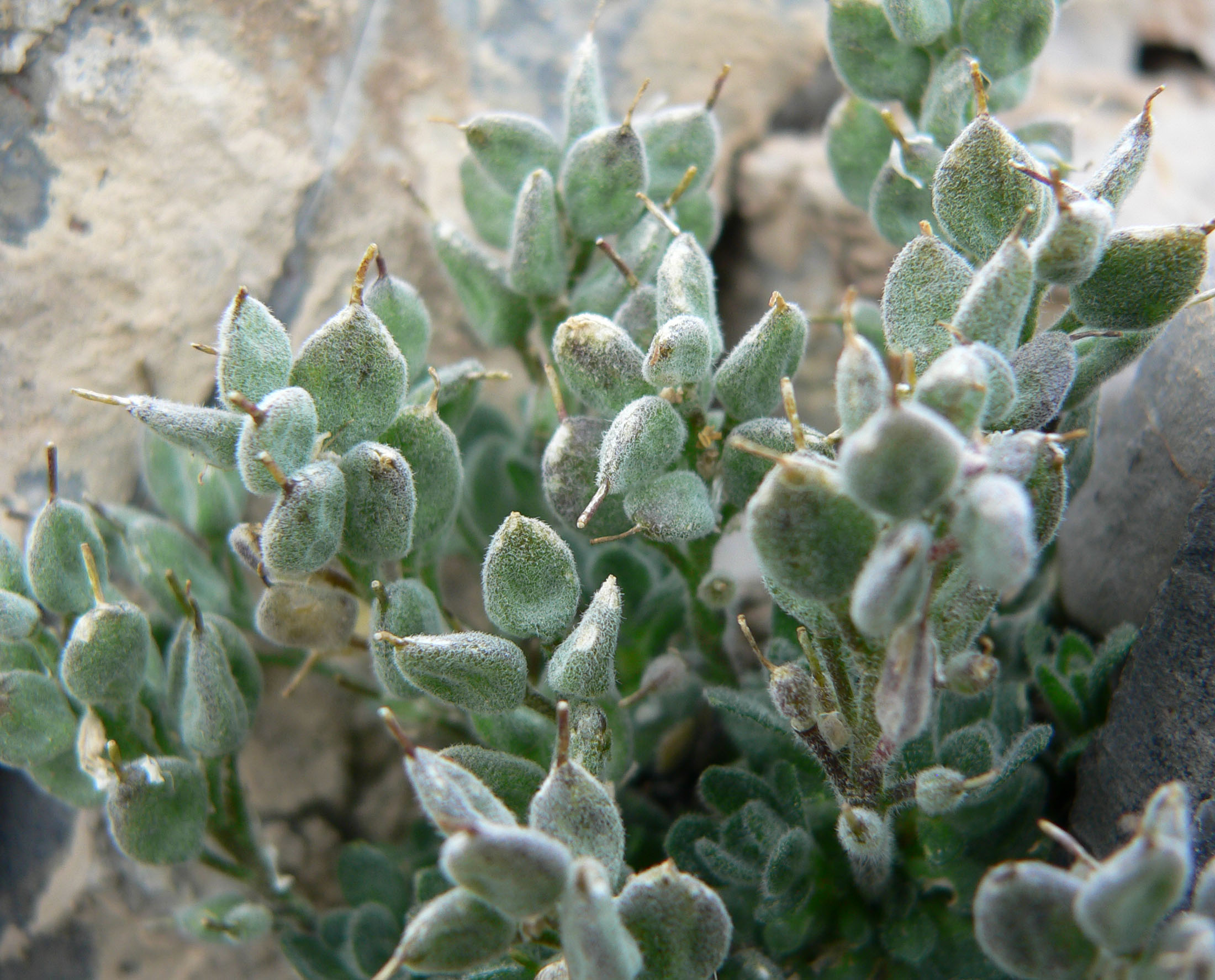
Draba jaegeri (variety of whitlow-grass in seed)
