= Lost Ship of the Desert =

American tall tale

The Lost Ship of the Desert is the subject of legends about various historical maritime vessels having supposedly become stranded and subsequently lost in the deserts of the American Southwest, most commonly in California's Colorado Desert. Since the period following the American Civil War, stories about Spanish treasure galleons buried beneath the desert sands north of the Gulf of California have emerged as popular legends in American folklore.

A mountaineer, storm-stained and brown
from farthest desert touched the town
And, striding through the town held, up
Above his head a jewell'd cup.
He put two fingers to his lip,
He whispere'd wild, he stood a-tip,
And lean'd the while with lifted hand,
And said, "a ship lies yonder dead,"
And said, "Doubloons lie sown in sand
along yon desert dead and brown,"

— Joaquin Miller 1875, The Ship in the Desert,
Roberts Brothers' version.

== Stories ==
=== The "Lost Galleon" ===
The earliest tales of a lost Spanish galleon appeared shortly after the Colorado River flood of 1862. Colonel Albert S. Evans reported seeing such a ship in 1863. In the Los Angeles Daily News of August 1870, the ship was described as a half-buried hulk in a drying alkali marsh or saline lake, west of Dos Palmas, California, and 40 miles north of Yuma, Arizona. It could easily be viewed at a distance of several miles from a mesa that lay between Dos Palmas and Palma Seca, California. The stories have given Palma Seca other names: Soda Springs, Indian Springs, and Bitter Springs, as the area was not well mapped in 1870. Expeditions were sent out in search of her, but the ship had either never existed or had vanished into the sand and mud once again. The Galleon, according to legend, is now under the waters of the modern Salton Sea.

There are those who claim the ship is Thomas Cavendish's Content, filled with pirate plunder; others claim that she is the Iqueue, a ship of Spanish mutineers.

==== Pearl ship of Juan de Iturbe ====
This legend may refer to the same ship as the Lost Galleon, but its own story has always placed it in a distinct location, closer to the sand hills west of El Centro, California. Descriptions suggest it is closer to the size of one of Christopher Columbus' small caravels. The pearl ship is rumored to have been seen as recently as the 1970s.

The story goes that in 1615, Spanish explorer Juan de Iturbe embarked on a pearl-harvesting expedition, during which his crew sailed a shallow-drafted caravel up the Gulf of California. A high tidal bore carried him across a strait into Lake Cahuilla, a saltwater lake periodically connected to the gulf which was already in the process of drying up permanently. After exploring the lake for several days, Iturbe found himself unable to sail out again, whereupon he beached his craft and made his way back to the nearest Spanish settlement on foot, leaving behind a fortune in black pearls.

Iturbe's alleged ship has been seen and lost several times, and there are several stories about it having been looted. A mule driver traveling with the de Anza expeditions through Alta California was said to have removed the pearls in 1774. In 1907, a farmhand named Elmer Carver noticed odd-shaped fence posts while working on Niles Jacobsen's farm in Imperial, California. Mrs. Jacobsen claimed a wind storm had revealed the remains of a ship, which the Jacobsens had repurposed into a fence. Mr. Jacobsen had also found gems which he sold in Los Angeles.

=== Ferry boat or river schooner ===
This story grew out of an effort to explain or debunk the Lost Galleon story. It is thought that an abandoned ferry or steamboat that had broken away during a Colorado River flood and had been left dry in the vast sands of the river delta is the origin of the rumors. Others claim that it was a schooner that gold-seekers wishing to search the more inaccessible portions of the Colorado River had built in Los Angeles and hauled through the desert by a mule or oxen team until the animals perished, leaving the boat mired in soft sand.

The ferry boat story changed over time more often than the Lost Galleon story. One incarnation said that a small ferry (a two-man sweep) was built away from the river in a place a hundred feet or so above sea level, where a source of wood was found, and that a team of six (or more) oxen perished hauling it through the sand near Los Algodones.

== Evaluation of the legends ==
From a smattering of first-, second- and third-hand accounts, a variety of fictional (especially graphic and cinematic) variations of the Lost Ship stories have been created. Not surprisingly, the first-hand accounts are extremely rare. Many of the above references fit the Lost Mines and Urban Legends molds, where the story passes from ear to ear with all evidence disappearing along the way.

Searching for and finding the remains of a Lost Ship is now rather problematic. The greater part of the Salton Sink has been submerged under the Salton Sea since 1905, and much of the adjacent land is under military control and has even been used for bombing ranges, rendering on-the-ground searches highly hazardous and/or illegal.

Lands adjacent to Laguna Salada in Baja California, and between the Gulf of California and the Salton Sea, regularly receive wind-blown sand from the desiccated delta of the much-diverted Colorado River, generating vast sand dune systems. Aerial searches using ground-penetrating radar might reveal ships' remains, but there has not yet been an agency that undertook this project and revealed its findings. Whether or not any such ships actually existed, the legends persist and remain entertaining to many.

Around AD 1500, the lake was 26 times the present size of the Salton Sea, at which time the water would have been 40 feet above sea level according to data from ArcGIS. Add to this the quite large tide swings as well as possible increase from rains, and it seems that navigation may have been quite possible. It has flooded and dried eight times between 1824 and 1905. In 1540 Spanish explorer Diaz was in the area, and by 1700 to 1750 the lake had infilled. Presently there is a "high ground" in Northern Mexico, of 23 feet, or 6+m. Thus a ship of 8 foot draft would need to have an additional 30 feet of water, above "sea level". While "king tides" of summer and winter are the highest, and conceivably a storm surge could add further water building up, wind-blown up the Sea of Cortez, 30 feet of additional depth seems highly unlikely.

== Media renditions of Lost Ship stories ==
This is a media timeline list of material related to the "lost ship" in the California desert; it shows how the story has changed in each generation's telling.

Note: Although most written items are a paragraph or more long, and sometimes lengthy articles, some are only a brief sentence or two in passing of what the author had heard and thought about a ship in the desert story.

=== 1800s ===
1870	The Galaxy, V.10, No.1, Jan. 1870 (New York newspaper) "In the Valley of the Shadow" by Albert S. Evans; Reprinted 1873 in Evans' book, "A la California, Sketches of Life in the Golden State." * Autumn of 1863 – Evans' horse died, leaving him to walk out from the Colorado Desert's Dos Palmas westward toward Palma Seca, where Evans saw the lost ship.
1870	Los Angeles News, Aug. 1870 (California newspaper) "Interesting Discovery" (see: 1953 Nov. "The Calico Print") * Indians report a ship emerging from a drying alkaline marsh.
1870	Sacramento Union, Oct. 6, 1870 (California newspaper) "Dateline Los Angeles?" (see: 1977 July Lost Treasure magazine) * Article about men from San Bernardino seeking the ship.
1870	Sacramento Union, Oct. 13, 1870 (California newspaper) "Dateline Los Angeles?" (see: 1977 July "Lost Treasure" magazine) * Article about ship hunters returning without discovery.
1870	Sacramento Union, Nov. 16, 1870 (California newspaper) "Dateline Los Angeles?" (see: 1977 July "Lost Treasure" magazine) * Article about new search for fossil boat.
1870	Proceedings of California Academy of Sciences, Nov. 21, 1870 (California journal) notes of regular monthly meeting * Albert S. Evans tells about the two different times he saw the ship; not a mirage, nor Martin Vise's oxen-hauled schooner.
1870	Chicago Tribune, Dec. 20, 1870 (Chicago, Illinois newspaper) "Finding of the desert ship" * report of a ship found on the Colorado desert
1870	San Bernardino Guardian, Dec. 31, 1870 (California newspaper) "The Search for the Lost Ship" (see: 1953 Nov. "The Calico Print") * Joshua Talbot leaves Clusker party, having found nothing.
1871	San Bernardino Guardian, Jan. 14, 1871 (California newspaper) "Return of the Ship Prospectors" (see: 1953 Nov. "The Calico Print") * The Clusker party returns, not having found the ship.
1871	Proceedings of California Academy of Sciences, July 3, 1871 (California journal) notes of regular monthly meeting * Author concludes based on correspondence that the ship is an optical illusion.
1871	Proceedings of the American Antiquarian Society, Oct. 21, 1871: P. 8-9 (Worcester, Massachusetts journal) notes of annual meeting * A report on what the California Academy of Sciences had previously reported.
1872	Sacramento Union, Sept. 30, 1872 (California newspaper) "Dateline Los Angeles?" (see: 1947 "Gold Guns & Ghost Towns" by Chalfant) * The "Arizona" desert ship proves to be a ferryboat.
1873	Inyo Independent, Sept. 27, 1873 (California newspaper) "? Lost Ship? " (see: 1977 July "Lost Treasure" magazine) * James expedition found mast of ship.
1873	A La California: Sketches of life in the Golden State (book – chapter IX, p. 201) by Albert S. Evans, 1873 * Same as Evans' 1870 "Shadow of Death" newspaper account; this book was published after his death at sea.
1874	The Ship in the Desert (book of verse / poem) by Joaquin Miller, 1874 published by Roberts Brothers, Boston, and by Chapman & Hall, London. * The British edition is not quite the same as the American edition; Miller rewrote his poem. * Men battle over a beautiful Indian maiden; everyone dies at the ship in the desert.
1875	"The Ship in the Desert" (poem) by W. T. Grant & Pap Walker written in 1875, Olancha, California. published in Desert Padre (book) by Joan Brooks, 1997. * The desert ship as a sort of Flying Dutchman in Death Valley.
1878	On the Frontier: Reminiscences of Wild Sports, Personal Adventures, and Strange Scenes (book, p. 244) by J. S. Campion, 1878 * Mission Indians & Monks of Lower California have a tradition of a wreck freighted with gold from Arizona – the Spanish "El Dorado" Author knew of two well-equipped expeditions that nearly perished of thirst while searching for the ship near Dos Palmas, California.
1881	Reminiscences of a Ranger, or Early times in Southern California (book, p.. 423) by Major Horace Bell, 1881 * Story about Joshua Talbot finding a mule-hauled boat built by Perry & Woodworth of Los Angeles.
1886	Chicago Tribune Sept. 12, 1886 (Chicago, Illinois newspaper) "Whence came the ship?" * A MYSTERY OF THE FAMOUS SO-CALLED COLORADO DESERT
1886	Atlanta Constitution Sept. 20, 1886 (Atlanta, Georgia newspaper) "The Stranded Ship" * a mystery of the famous so-called Colorado desert
1886	Boston Daily Globe, Sept. 26, 1886 (Boston, Mass. newspaper) "Whence the ship?" p. 17 * A Mystery of the Colorado Desert. Unsuccessful Effort of a Prospector to Examine the Hulk. A Padre's Theory that it May Have Been a Gold-Laden Galleon.
1889	American Notes and Queries, Sept. 14, 1889 (Philadelphia, Pennsylvania, magazine) Ed. by William S. Walsh: "The Ship in the Desert" * Story about finding frame of small two-sweeper ferry boat that was hauled by half a score or more of bull-teams which mostly perished.
1889	Los Angeles Times, Oct. 6, 1889 (Los Angeles, Calif. newspaper) "The Ship of the Desert" * The Phantom ship of California
1889	Sandusky Daily Register, Nov. 16, 1889 (Sandusky, Ohio newspaper) "The Phantom Ship" * The hulk buried in the sands of the Colorado desert
1890	Atlanta Constitution, July 27, 1890 (Atlanta, Georgia newspaper) "A Ship of the Desert" by Paul Grant * a traveler had found in the desert of Colorado a dismantled ship
1891	Ohio Democrat, Jan. 8, 1891 (New Philadelphia, Ohio newspaper) * a Mysterious Vessel said to have been seen in the Colorado desert
1891	Galveston Daily News, Feb. 1, 1891 (Galveston, Texas newspaper) "A Ship in the desert" * Strange tale of a Spanish Galleon in Colorado desert. This article was printed nationwide and was the inspiration for John Blondelle Burton.
1891	The Standard, Feb. 10, 1891 (Ogden, Utah newspaper) "A ship in the desert" * Strange tale of a Spanish Galleon
1891	Los Angeles Times, Mar. 1, 1891 (Los Angeles, Calif. newspaper) "A ship in the desert" * Strange tale of a Spanish Galleon
1892	Manual of Geography (book, p. 95) by Jacques W. Redway, 1892 * In the sink of the San Felipe, or Conchilla, Valley, the ship is beyond doubt the frame of a ferry boat designed for the Colorado River. The teams dragging it to the river died. The ship's projector (promoter?) was living in 1885.
1892	Proceedings of the Royal Geographical Society, 1892 (Great Britain journal) Jacques W. Redway: "New Lake in The Colorado Desert" * Blames the legend on Joaquin Miller, and refers to Maj. Horace Bell.
1895	The Ship in the Desert (book) by John Blondelle Burton, 1895 * Historical adventure fiction based on newspaper story.

=== 1900s ===
1909	National Geographic Magazine, Aug. 1909 (U.S. magazine) W.C. Mendenhall: "The Colorado Desert" * mentions a widely published and graphic 1891 Lost Ship account.
1916	History of Arizona Book IV (book, p. 31) by Tomas E. Farish chapter: "Charles B. Genung – His Story of how he became a Hassayamper" * Hassayamper is synonym for Arizonian Liar.
1919	Los Angeles Examiner, June 15, 1919 (Los Angeles Calif. newspaper) J.A. Guthrie: "Mystery of the Desert" (see: 1953 Nov. "The Calico Print") * Tells Coahuilla Indian Chief Cabazon's version.
1928	Los Angeles Times, April 8, 1928 (Los Angeles Calif. newspaper) "The Lost Ship of the Desert" * It was that ole buzzard, 'Quartz' Warner, that swore by all the howling bobcats that he saw It.
1933	Journey of the Flame (book) by Walter Nordhoff under the pen name Antonio De Fierro Blanco (see: 1961 "Desert Rat Scrap Book, Packet 1 of Pouch 11") * One of the most quoted sources for Pearl Ship stories.
1939	Desert Magazine, Jan. 1939 (Palm Desert, California magazine) Ed. by Randall Henderson: "Lost Ships: Fact or Fiction" + Charles C. Niehaus: "Lost Ship of the Desert"
1940	Golden Mirages (book, p. 139) by Phillip Bailey, 1940 chapter: "Lost Ship of the Desert"
1941	The Colorado Conquest (book) by David O. Woodbury, 1941 (see: 1950 "Desert Rat Scrap, Packet #3 of Pouch #3)
1941	Death Valley Days (NBC radio broadcast) aired Jan 24, 1941, #533: "The Lost Pearl Ship"
1942	Marvel Mystery Comics #29, Mar. 1942 (U.S. comic book) Mickey Spillane: "The Ship in the Desert" * This was a short written story used as filler between comics, and locates a galleon near Willcox, Arizona
1947	Gold, Guns, & Ghost Towns (book, p. 164) by Walter Chalfant (aka Willie Arthur Chalfant), 1947 * Has story of the lost Pearl Ship of Juan de Iturbe
1948	Arizona Highways magazine, Apr. 1948 (Phoenix, Arizona magazine) article, p. 4: "The Ship in the Desert," by Norman G. Wallace * At the time the railroad was being built down the west coast of Mexico, engineer Bill Walters met with Papago Indian Juan Pablo (a.k.a. Khave the badger). Juan Pablo showed Bill pearls, china dishes, and gold coins taken from a ship half-buried in the sand hills of the Arizona mountain Pinacate.
1949	Chillicothe Constitution Tribune April 6, 8, and 9, 1949 (Chillicothe, Missouri newspaper) "Pop goes the queen": Newspaper serial story written by Bob Wade and Bill Miller * Fictional story of a murder involving an 18th-century Spanish treasure galleon, which sailed up the flooded Colorado river in 1744.
1949	Los Angeles Times, Aug. 1949 (Los Angeles, California newspaper) (see: June 8, 2003 Los Angeles Times) * Three UCLA students search for a Viking exploration ship blown off course.
1950	Action Comics #146, July 1950 (U.S. comic book) Joe Smachson: "Vigilante, The Galleon in the Desert" * Musical villain using fake desert galleon like a Trojan horse; caught by musical hero.
1950	Desert Rat Scrap Book, Packet #3, Pouch #3, 1950 ed. by Harry Oliver: "The Spanish Galleon At The Bottom Of The Salton Sea"
1950	Western Folklore, Vol. 9, No. 3, 1950 (Long Beach, California journal of Western States Folklore Society) "New Tales of American Phantom Ships" * Story is of an Elizabethan boat flying over the Colorado Desert near Indio, California.
1950	Dell Comics: 'Gene Autry Comics, Vol. 1, No. 39, May 1950 (U.S. comic book) "The Lost Galleon" * Story of how the Conquistadors lost a ship in the desert near Laguna Salada south east of San Diego
1951	Dell Comics: Gene Autry Comics, Vol. 1, No. 52, June 1951 (U.S. comic book) "Gene Autry and the Ship in the Desert" * Story has Autry finding ship in ancient river channel after a flash flood.
1951	The Indio Date Palm, Oct. 4, 1951 (Indio, California newspaper) Paul Wilheilm: "Paul Wilheim's Desert Column – A Ghost of the Vikings" (see: 1953 Nov. "The Calico Print")
1951	Pioneer Cabin News (Nov. 1951 – Apr. 1952) (San Bernardino, California journal of the San Bernardino Society of California Pioneers) O.J. Fisk: "Story of the Pearl Ship in the Desert" (see: 1953 Nov. "The Calico Print")
1951	Legendary and Geological History of Lost Desert Gold (book, p. 66) by Ralph L. Caine, 1951
1953-	San Bernardino Sun-Telegram, Feb. 15, 1953 (San Bernardino, California newspaper) L. Burr Belden: "The Lost Spanish Galleon" (see: 1953 Nov. "The Calico Print")
1953	"Casey Ruggles," May 23, 1853 – Jan. 2, 1954 (syndicated daily U.S. newspaper cartoon strip) Warren Tufts: "The Pearl Galleon Episodes"
1953	The Calico Print, Nov. 1953 (Twenty Nine Palms, California magazine) Ed. by Harold & Lucille Weight: "Lost Ship in The Desert" + Ed Stevens: "The Serpent-Necked Canoa" + Adelaide Arnold: "Butcherknife Ike and the Lost Ship" + reprints several other well-known Lost Ship accounts
1954	''Uncle Scrooge #7, Sept. 1954 (Walt Disney comic book) Carl Barks: The Seven Cities of Cibola (the story was originally untitled, while it was first titled in a 1967 reprint)
1957	Lost Treasures: The Search for Hidden Gold (book, p. 48) by Robert G. Ferguson, 1957
1959	Bat Masterson, starring Gene Barry (NBC television program) original air date: July 15, 1959; Richard O'Conner & Wells Root, writers: "The Desert Ship"
1961	Desert Rat Scrap Book, Packet #1 of Pouch #11, ed. by Harry Oliver "The Spanish Galleon Of Salton Sea", by Antonio de Fierro Blanco
1962	Suspense, starring Matt Cooper, Bill Adam, & Jean Gillespie (CBS Radio Program) original Air date Aug. 26, 1962 "The Lost Ship" episode was written by Irwin Lewis
1962	More Western Treasures (book) Jesse Rascoe, editor chapter – "The Lost Ship of the Desert"
1962	The Beckoning Desert (book) by Ed. M. Ainsworth, 1962 * Tells of the 1949 search for Joseph Ive's lost steamship.
1963	Lost Desert Bonanzas (book, p. 12) by Eugene L. Conrotto, 1963 * Written to mark 25 years of Desert Magazine's lost mine stories.
1966	Buried Treasures and Lost Mines of Southern California (book, p. 90) By Jack Black, 1966 chapter: "A Handful of Mysteries"
1966	Desert Magazine, March 1966 (Palm Desert, California magazine) D. Galbraith: "Lost Ships of the Desert" (??) +Bill Boyd: "Lost Ships of the Desert"
1967	California: a Guide to the Golden State (book, p. 461) by the Federal Writers Project of the Works Progress Administration of Northern California, 1967 * Brief mention of 1890 old timer at Kane Springs claiming to have seen the ancient ship nearby.
1967	The Mysterious West (book) by Choral Pepper & Brad Williams, 1967
1968	Dead Men do Tell Tales (book, p. 71) by Lake Erie Schaefer, 1968 chapter: "Desert Pearls"
1969	True Treasure magazine (date of issue # unknown) (U.S. magazine) Ray Weiss: "Letter to the editor" * Ray wrote about a sighting by plane, and plans to search afoot.
1970	Saga's Treasure Special: Exclusive Guide to America's Fabulous Bonanzas Vol.1, #1, 1970 (book) chapter by Al Masters: "California's Fabulous Dune-Locked Pearl Galleon"
1973	Treasure Search magazine, Vo1 #1, 1973, p. 52 (Canoga Park, California magazine) Jeff Ferguson: "Pearl Galleon of the California Desert"
1974	Desert Magazine, April 1974 (Palm Desert, California magazine) Harvey Grey: "Phantom Ship of the Gran Desierto"
1977	Desert Magazine, March 1977 (Palm Desert, California magazine) Harold O. Weight: "Charley Clusker and the lost ship" * 1870s Clusker found a good way to acquire a grubstake.
1977	Lost Treasure magazine, July 1977, p. 58 (Grove, Oklahoma magazine) Al Masters: "Amazing Treasure Ship of the California Desert"
1979	Lost Treasure magazine, June 1979, p. 37 (Grove, Oklahoma magazine) Benito Villa: "Treasure ship in the Desert"
1980	Desert Magazine, Nov. 1980 (Palm Desert, California magazine) Choral Pepper: "Ships that Pass in the Desert Sands"
1983	Lost Treasure magazine, December 1983, p. 24 (Grove, Oklahoma magazine) Jack Peterson: "Was the Lost Ship of the Desert Found?" * Story from 1973: Paranoid hermit Lawrence Justice found ship with WWII military air photos of Imperial Valley. would not reveal location until getting government search permits in order. Justice died before finishing paperwork in late 70's.
1984	Treasure Found! magazine, Spring 1984, p. 26 "New Clues Surface to Three Fabulous Caches"; Publisher Ken Doe interviews George Mroczkowski * Article includes a story of George going to a remote location with a friend of Larry Justus, with photos of what could be part of the ship. Story also mentions the Viking Ship, and a group of wildflower enthusiasts who had seen it, and a Mexican who had taken one of the shields.
1989	Riverside Press-Enterprise, July 30, 1989 (Riverside, California newspaper) Tom Patterson: "Tales Persist of Viking and Chinese Ships Found in the Desert"
1990	Lost Treasure magazine, Aug. 1990, p. 30 (Grove, Oklahoma magazine) Michael Paul Henson: "California – Golden State Glitters with Gold – Spanish Ship"
1991	Lost Treasure magazine, Apr. 1991, p. 44 (Grove, Oklahoma magazine) B.G. Revis: "Treasure Ships of the California Desert"
1992	Columbus Was Last (book, p. 162) by Patrick Huyghe, 1992 * Tells of Vikings? exploring upper Gulf of California.
1992	Ghost Ship, starring Jay Robinson (movie) James T. Flocker, director * Teens find adventure in the desert. Not to be confused with the 2003 Warner Brothers movie with the same name.
1993	Traveler (a tile mural located at subway entrance to Union Station, Los Angeles, California) artist: Terry Schoonhoven * Far left corner of the mural shows a galleon in a desert.
1995	The Periscope (Coachella Valley, California Museum annual publication) "The Salton Sea, California's Overlooked Treasure" 1995, p. 9 Pat Laflin: "Lost Ships in the Desert"
1995	Buried Treasures of California (book) by W. C. Jameson, 1995 * 1892 prospectors find mast of ship but no ship.
1996	Uncle Scrooge Adventures in Color #7, Aug. 6, 1996 (Disney comic book, p. 31) Geoffrey Blum: "Wind From a Dead Galleon" * Text filler has the story of what inspired the Carl Barks 1954 comic book.
1997	Little Known Tales in California History (book, p.. 30) by Alton Pryor, 1997
1998	Classic Tales in California History (book, p 67) by Alton Pryor, 1998
1998	Mysterious California (book) by Mike Marinacci, 1998 * Has a chapter on the lost ship, and a chapter on the Viking ship.
1999	Desert Lore of Southern California (book) by Choral Pepper, 1999 * Contains several ship legends including the Elmer Carver account.
1999	Book Again, Sept. 1999 (online newsletter, folklore section) Joe Nolte: "The Phantom Ship of the Salton Sea" * Mention of sighting by three German prospectors in 1878, and a sighting in Feb. of 1882.
1999	Great God Pan, The Champion of California magazine #13, 1999 (San Francisco, California magazine) Eric R. Blum "The Mysterious Lost Ship of the Desert"

=== 2000s ===
2000	Lost Treasure's Surf & Turf, June 2000 (Lost Treasure magazine's online newsletter) Ken Weinman: "Treasure Galleons of the Mojave desert"
2000	Strange Sea Tales Along the California Coast (book) by Claudine Burnett, 2000 * Published for Historical Society of Long Beach; has a story on Viking ships in the desert.
2001	Desert USA Online, April 2001 (online magazine, Borrego Springs, California) Tim McCrerey: "The Last Voyage of the Content"
2002	Lost Treasure magazine, Nov. 2002, p. 18 (Grove, Oklahoma magazine) Ettore & Diana Nannetti: "Pearls in the Desert: A Galleon Hidden in Sand"
2002	"La Contessa" Art Car, Aug. 2002 – Dec. 2006 built by Simon Cheffins, Maduro and the Extra Action Marching Band * This desert ship was a half sized 16th century Spanish galleon replica. It was built around a school bus and cruised the Burning Man festival in Nevada's Black rock desert. It was destroyed by an arsonist in Dec. 6 2006
2003	Desert USA Online, May 2003 (online magazine, Borrego Springs, California) Bob Difley: "The Lost Ship of the Mojave"
2003	Los Angeles Times, June 8, 2003, p. B4 (Los Angeles, California newspaper) Cecilia Rasmussen: "Were there Spanish Pearls Before Brine in Salton Sea?" * Has a list of airplanes lost in the Salton Sea.
2004	"Ben Jordan: Paranormal Investigator" 2004 (animated computer game adventure) Francisco Gonzalez: "Case 2 – The Lost Galleon of the Salton Sea"
2005	The Lost Ship in the Desert: The True Story (booklet) by William Pfost, 2005, 2007 * Was updated and rewritten with several changes and corrections in 2007. After the 2005 publication, Bill Pfost met a former (never to be named) rancher from Indio who claims to have gone to the lost ship in Imperial Valley with other Imperial and Coachella Valley residents about 40 years before.
2005	Desert Magazine, June 2005 (Palm Desert Sun newspaper publication, California) Ann Japenga: "The Glamorous Galleon"
2005	Sacramento Valley Detecting Buffs, Aug. 5, 2005 (online newsletter – pdf. format) "The Legend of the Mojave Desert's Lost Ship"
2006	Weird California (book, p.. 61) by Joe Osterle, 2006
2006	From the Desert to the Sea ... , Jan. 21, 2006 (online Blog / syndicated newsletter) John Stoddard: "Story for a Desert Campfire"
2006	Exploritoria, Sept. 2, 2006, (online Blog) "Exploritoria of a Viking Ship in the Desert"
2007	Prime View, June 6, 2007 (online edition of View Neighborhood Newspapers a Las Vegas, Nevada regional newspaper) "Ships in the desert? Mirage or unsolved mystery?" By Florine Lawlor * tells of 1867 sighting by Dusty Millor & Duke Chellow
2009	Stay Away From Pinto Canyon Published June 3, 2009 by the San Diego Reader. Written by Robert Marcos The article is about a hiking trip to view petroglyphs which are located in Pinto Canyon, west of the Yuma Desert. One petroglyph clearly shows a large two-masted sailing vessel, with oars on each side.
2014	Pearls, Petroglyphs, and Desert Shipwrecks Published April 16, 2014 by the San Diego Reader. Written by Robert Marcos Writer Robert Marcos identifies the Spanish ship depicted in the petroglyph he found in Pinto Canyon. He follows the journey of Captain Juan Iturbe as he and his men sail up the Sea of Cortez in search of pearls, and the eventual abandonment of their ship south of the present-day Salton Sea.

== See also ==
- Mahogany Ship, a similar legend concerning an alleged shipwreck in Victoria, Australia
- Francisco de Ulloa
- Sahara (2005 film)
