= Carl Eytel =

German-American painter (1862–1925)

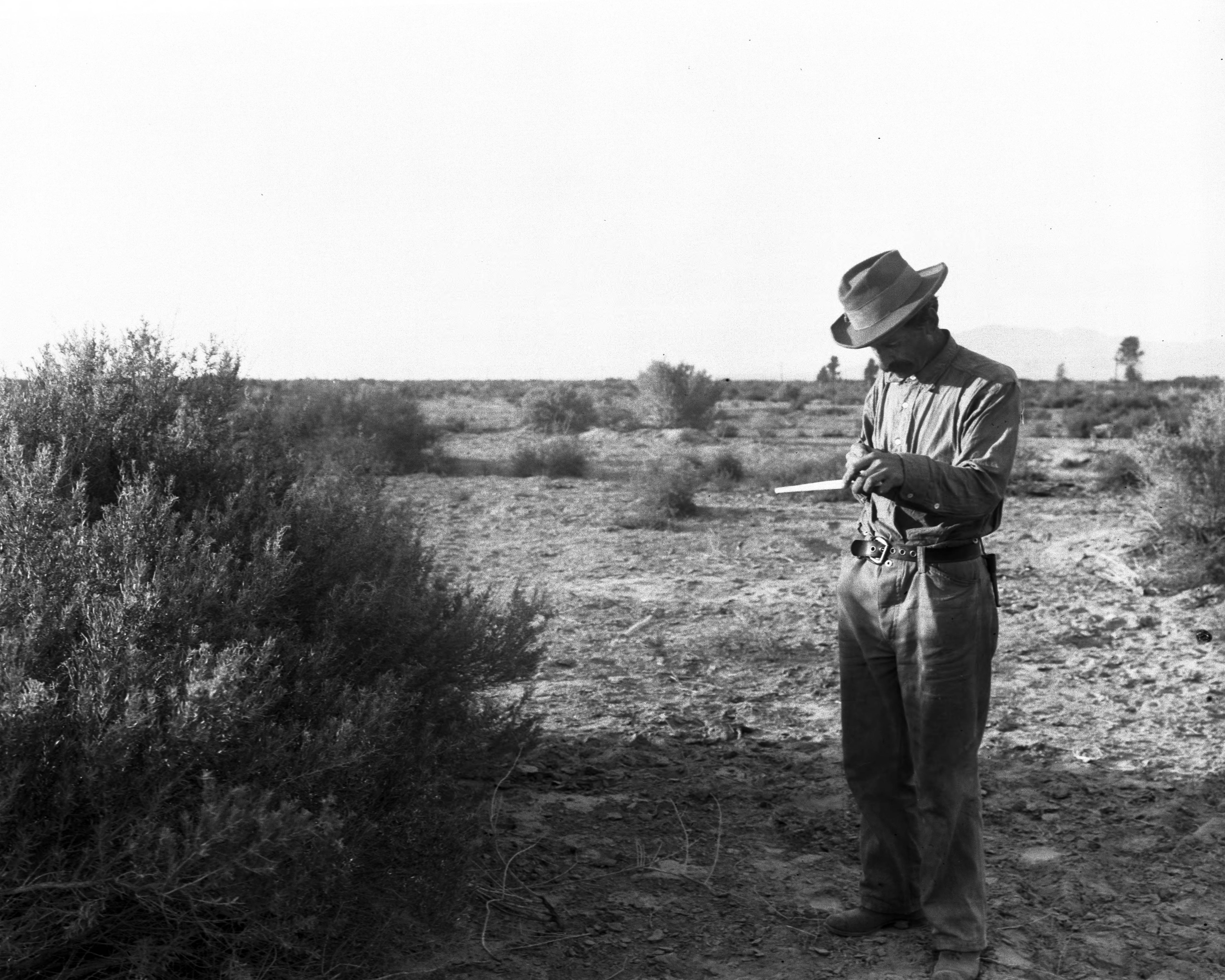
- Eytel sketching – during his trip with George Wharton James, c. 1900
- Born: Karl Adolf Wilhelm Eytel; September 12, 1862; Maichingen, Kingdom of Württemberg, German Confederation
- Died: September 17, 1925 (aged 63); Banning, California, U.S.
- Resting place: Jane Augustine Patencio Cemetery, Palm Springs, California; 33.8224°N 116.5340°W
- Education: Self taught; Royal Art School of Stuttgart
- Known for: Painting; landscapes; illustrations
- Notable work: Desert near Palm Springs (1914) now in the California State Library California History Room
- Movement: "Smoketree School"; California Plein-Air Painting; American Impressionism; realism
- Patrons: Martha M. Newkirk

Carl Eytel (September 12, 1862 – September 17, 1925) was a German American artist who built his reputation for paintings and drawings of desert subjects in the American Southwest. Immigrating to the United States in 1885, he settled in Palm Springs, California in 1903. With an extensive knowledge of the Sonoran Desert, Eytel traveled with the author George Wharton James as he wrote the successful Wonders of the Colorado Desert, and contributed over 300 drawings to the 1908 work. While he enjoyed success as an artist, he lived as an ascetic and would die in poverty. Eytel's most important work, Desert Near Palm Springs, hangs in the History Room of the California State Library.

== Life ==
=== Early life and immigration ===
Carl Eytel was born as Karl Adolf Wilhelm Eytel in Maichingen, Böblingen to Tusnelda (née Schmid) and Friederick Hermann Eytel, a Lutheran minister in the Kingdom of Württemberg (now the state of Baden-Württemberg, near Stuttgart), Germany. As a boy, he became a ward of his grandfather when his father died. Eytel was well educated in the German gymnasium and became enamored of the American West while reading the works of Prussian natural science writer and explorer Alexander von Humboldt, which he found in the Stuttgart Royal Library. From 1880 to 1884 he studied forestry in Tübingen and then was drafted into the German Army. He first traveled to the United States in 1885 aboard the Suevia and worked as a ranch hand in Kansas. Later he worked at a slaughterhouse for 18 months to earn his living and to study cattle. In 1891, he read an article about the Palm Springs area in the San Francisco Call and was "incited" to visit the California desert.

=== Palm Springs ===
Eytel returned to Germany to study art for 18 months (1897–1898) at the Royal Art School Stuttgart and then re-immigrated to the United States. Wanting to be a cowboy, he worked as a cowhand in the San Joaquin Valley and in 1903 he would settle in Palm Springs. Living in small cabins he built himself, Palm Springs would remain his home. Eytel often walked on his travels, covering 400 miles in the Colorado Desert on foot. On one of his travels, he was nearly lynched as a horse thief, and in 1918, during a trip to northern Arizona, he was threatened with lynching as a German spy.

== Work ==
Pinus lambertiana (sugar-pine) by Eytel, from J. Smeaton Chase, Cone-bearing Trees of the California Mountains, 1911

While living for the most part as a "desert rat" and starving artist, he both traveled alone throughout the American Southwest and accompanied author J. Smeaton Chase and painter Jimmy Swinnerton on their travels. Serving as George Wharton James' guide to "every obvious and obscure location of importance", he illustrated James' two volume The Wonders of the Colorado Desert. The work was successful and received generally favorable reviews. The collaboration on the book lasted from 1903 to 1907. Eytel's illustrations were also used by James in his 1906 article "The Colorado Desert: As General Kearney Saw It".

=== Successes ===
By 1908 Eytel was exhibiting works in Pasadena and enjoying the patronage of socialite Martha M. Newkirk. He was also planning to build a bungalow in Beaumont, California. And, in 1909, his work was being exhibited in major art venues and the Kanst gallery in Los Angeles. Later, in 1911, after traveling with Chase on horseback, he contributed 21 realistic line art drawings to Chase's book, Cone-bearing Trees of the California Mountains.

Besides his work in Wonders of the Colorado Desert and Cone-bearing Trees, Eytel contributed (both drawings and articles) to the best periodicals, including the Los Angeles Times and, for nearly 14 years, the New Yorker Staats-Zeitung. (During his travels in the southwest he became friends with Los Angeles Times city editor Charles Lummis.) A stone wall in the dining room of Dr. Welwood Murray's early hotel was covered with an Eytel mural of Palm Canyon. His hundreds of drawings of native palms were his trademark and he became known as "The Artist of the Palms". His work helped publicize early Palm Springs. In 1977 his works were selling for $10,000 and under.

=== "Creative Brotherhood" ===
Along with naturalist Edmund C. Jaeger, and authors Chase and Charles Francis Saunders, Eytel was a core member of what University of Arizona Professor Peter Wild called a "Creative Brotherhood" that lived in Palm Springs in the early 20th century. Other Brotherhood members included cartoonist and painter Swinnerton, author James, and photographers Fred Payne Clatworthy and Stephen H. Willard. The men lived near each other (like Eytel, Jaeger built his own cabin), traveled together throughout the Southwest, helped with each other's works, and exchanged photographs which appeared in their various books.

The Brotherhood lasted from 1915 when Jaeger, who was the teacher in the Palm Springs one-room school house, met Eytel and Chase. It ended in 1923 when Chase died. (In 1924, after completing his studies at Occidental College in Los Angeles, Jaeger began a 30-year teaching career at Riverside Junior College in Riverside, California.) Jaeger wrote the initial eulogy for Eytel upon his death and in 1948, recalling his time with him, Jaeger said:

As an artist Eytel was largely self-taught.... Not widely schooled, but widely read. Eytel possessed a knowledge not only of the Greek and Roman classics but of the best literature of England, America and his native Germany. I never knew Eytel to sleep indoors. Trying to inure himself to hardships in the belief it would toughen his constitution....

Over the years it was Eytel who served as their "spiritual figurehead". Even after Jaeger left to complete his studies and Chase married the wealthy Isabel White (1917), the three, plus Saunders, often exchanged letters. Suffering from a "hacking and persistent cough", Eytel remained in Palm Springs, impoverished, and Swinnerton would buy art supplies for him. Later Eytel became a recluse.

=== Smoketree School ===
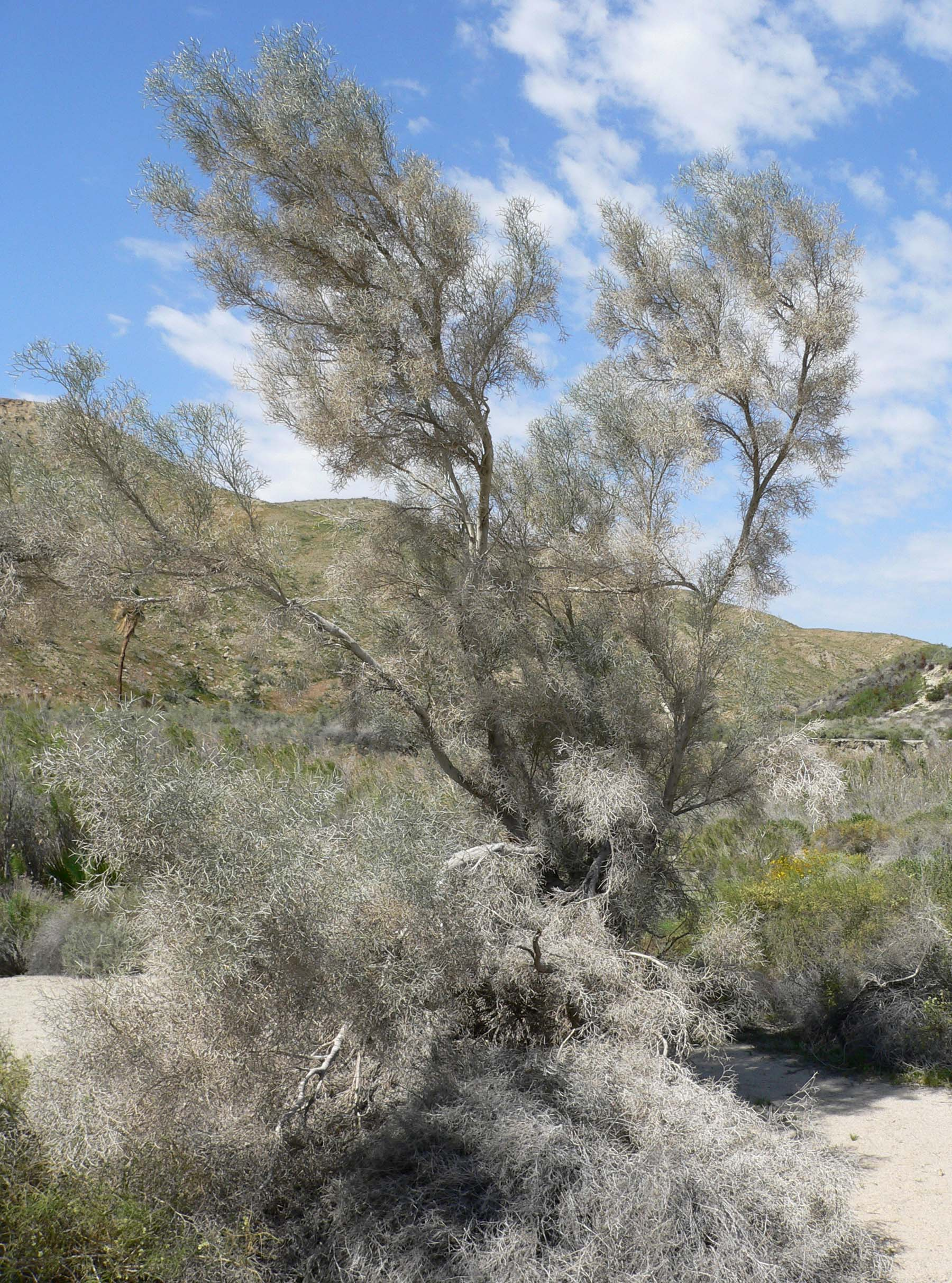
Smoketree (Psorothamnus spinosus)

Journalist Ann Japenga has characterized Eytel's work as "Smoketree School" – a school which is named after a favorite desert art subject, the smoketree. The school has origins with Alson S. Clark and Jack Frost, who were influenced by French impressionist Claude Monet. Other Smoketree artists include Carl Bray, Fred Chisnall, Maynard Dixon, Clyde Forsythe, Sam Hyde Harris, John Hilton, R. Brownell McGrew, Agnes Pelton, Hanson Puthuff and Swinnerton.

=== Style and subjects ===
from J. Smeaton Chase Our Araby (1920)

Like many artists of the desert southwest, Eytel's style was impressionistic. His subjects were varied and included the Mission San José de Tumacácori, in the Tumacácori National Historical Park near Nogales, Arizona (pre-restoration), and California Mission San Gabriel Arcángel and Mission San Juan Capistrano Spanish missions. His drawings for Cone-bearing Trees of the California Mountains and Wonders of the Colorado Desert were especially detailed and included Desert Bighorn Sheep, desert reptiles, and cattle. (His Mirage in the Desert (1905), painted for Wonders, depicts cattle and cowboys.)

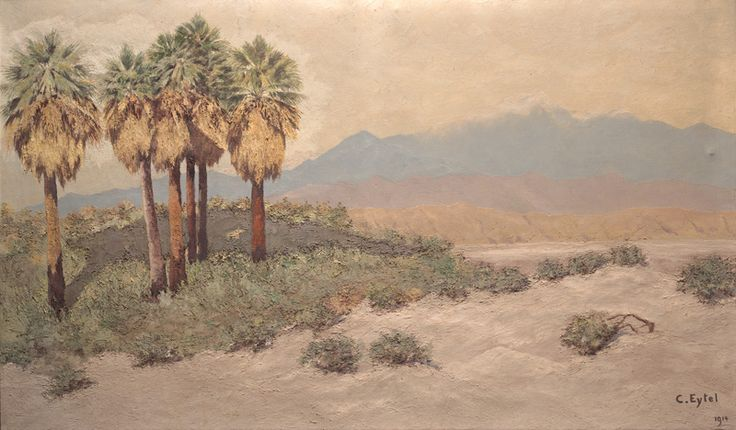
Desert near Palm Springs

Eytel depicted the life of Navajo, Hopi, Cahuilla, Serrano and Kamia peoples, including landscapes of the New Mexico Eight Northern Pueblos in San Ildefonso, Laguna, Tesuque and Taos Pueblo. The Walpi Pueblo on First Mesa, Hopi Reservation, Arizona, and Cocopah people near Calexico, California were drawn as well.

Prospectors working the Anaconda (Dale District) and Manana (Colorado River) mines in Arizona and the famous Picacho gold mine were drawn, as were the Rancho Guajome Adobe near Encinitas, California, the Sierra Bonita Ranch near Fort Grant, Arizona, turn of the century Tucson, Arizona, and the Yuma Territorial Prison, Yuma, Arizona.

His scenes from early Palm Springs included the stagecoach station and William Pester – "The Hermit of Palm Springs".

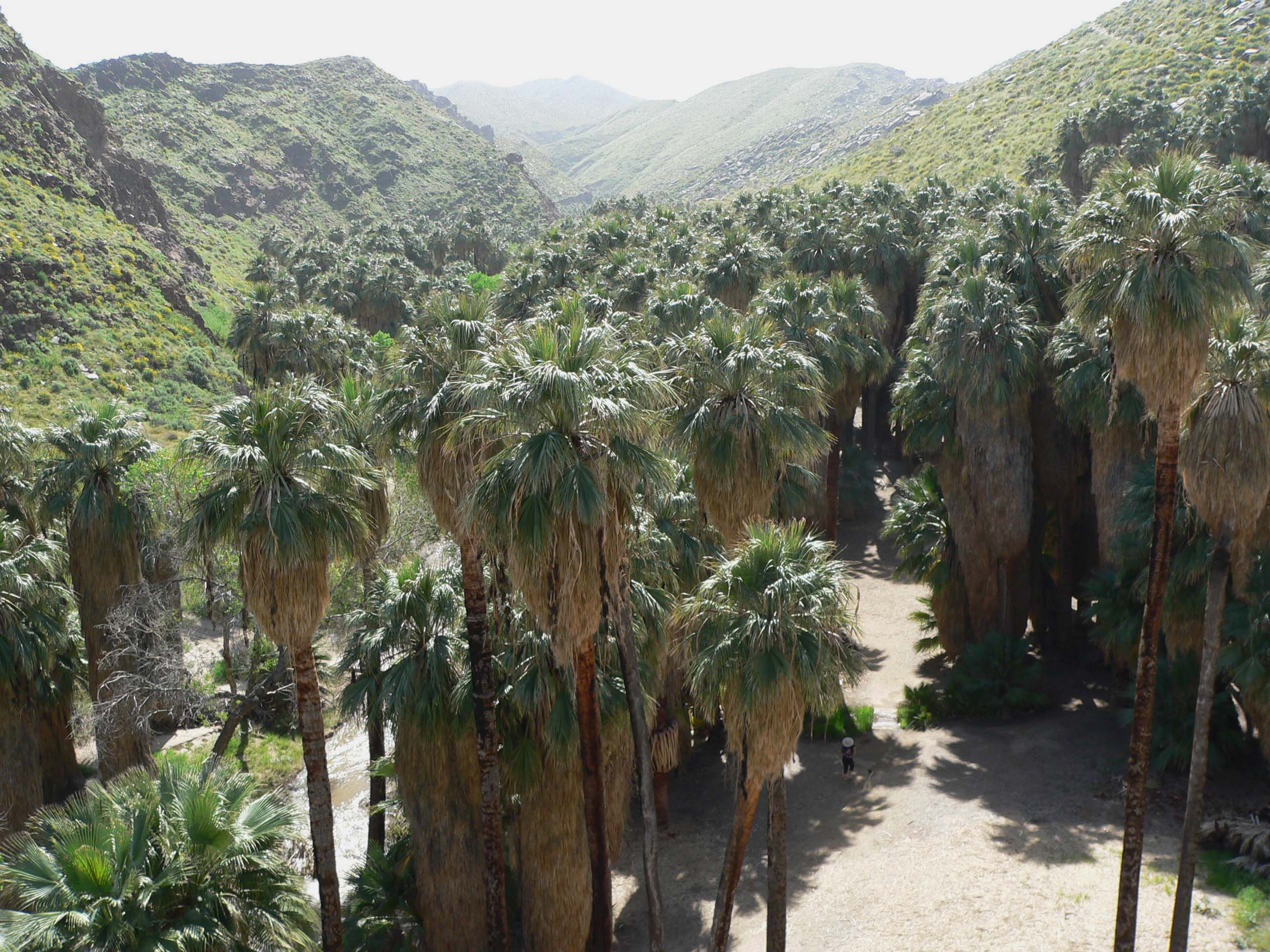
California Fan Palms (Washingtonia filifera), a favorite of Eytel, in Palm Canyon, near Palm Springs

Eytel's landscapes and mountain scenes in Wonders included:

- Ehrenberg, Arizona
- Algodones, including the Pilot Knob landmark, Imperial County, California
- Palo Verde, Arizona
- San Jacinto National Forest, California
- Oak Creek Canyon, within Coconino National Forest, Arizona
- Mt. San Gorgonio, California
- Mt. San Jacinto, California
- Royal Gorge, Colorado
- San Francisco Peaks near Flagstaff, Arizona
- Sentinel Rock and Cathedral Spires in Yosemite Valley, California
- Tahquitz Peak, near Idyllwild, California
- Twin Buttes, Navajo County, Arizona

== Honors ==
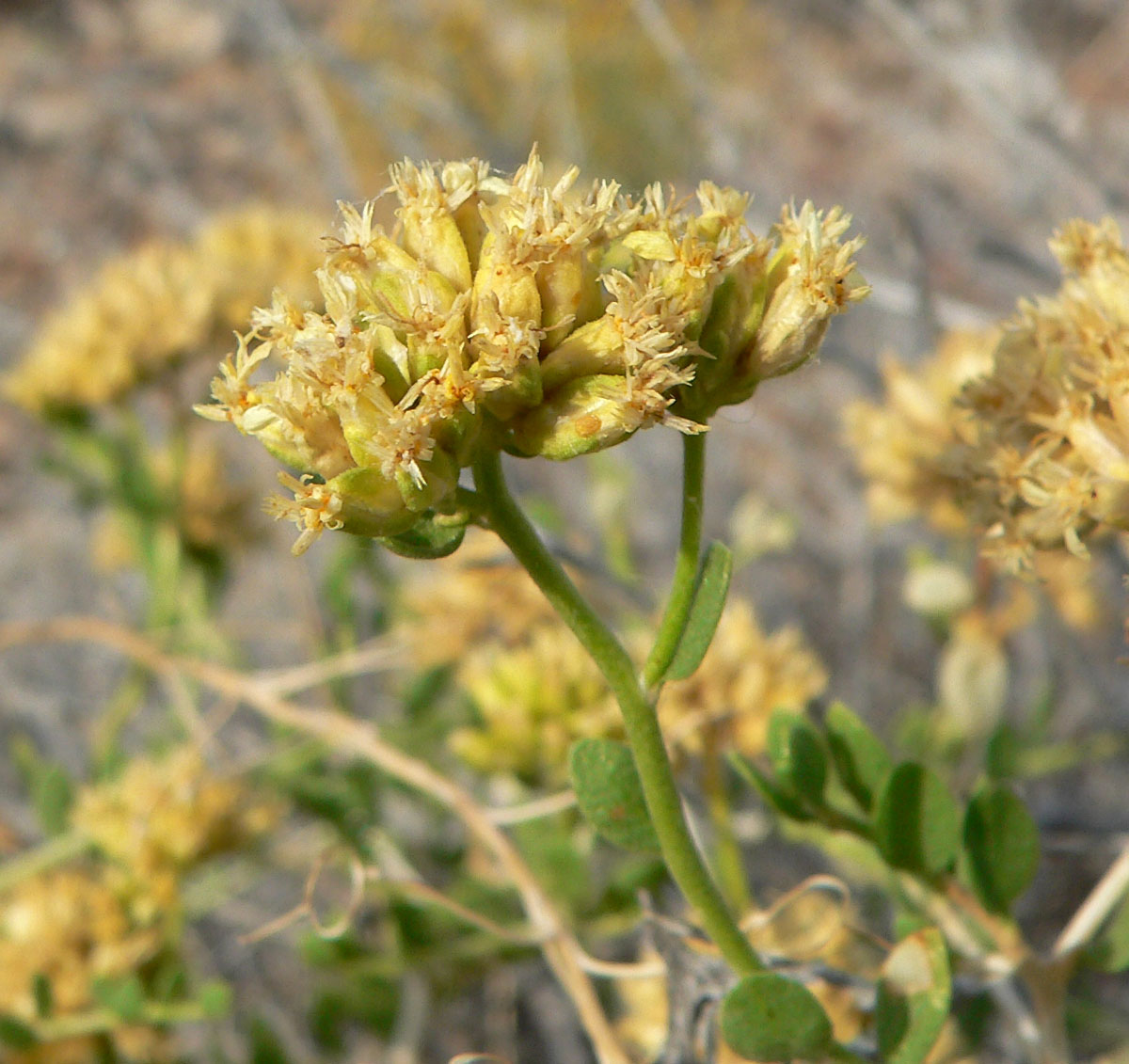
The desert shrub "Eytelia" (amphipappus fremontii)

Eytel was a friend of the Cahuilla people and they allowed him to be buried in their cemetery in Palm Springs after he died of tuberculosis in a Banning, California sanatorium. His funeral and burial were arranged by Nellie Coffman, who had established the original Desert Inn in the Palm Springs village in 1909.

Eytel received the following eulogy from Saunders writing in August 1926:

But to Carl Eytel, pioneer of Palm Springs artists, working there long before the world of fashion had heard of the place, Palm Springs was his home, and the desert his life. He knew it in all seasons, in all moods, and he painted it with a sort of religious ardor springing from unfailing love, in season and out. Others have been better draughtsmen than he, but when you look at a canvas by Eytel at his best you are looking into what seems the desert's heart.

His painting Desert near Palm Springs (1914) is displayed in the California History Room of the California State Library. The Palm Springs Art Museum has a set of Eytel's sketches and displays various of his paintings.

The desert shrub amphipappus fremontii was given the common name "eytelia" in his honor. The short "Via Eytel" in Palm Springs is named in his honor, as is the short "Eytel Road" in nearby Cathedral City.

== See also ==
Art topics:

- En plein air – painting in the open air, which Eytel usually did
  - California Plein-Air Painting – early 20th century movement, a regional variation on American Impressionism
    - California Art Club – a Plein-Air arts organization founded in 1909, but Eytel was not a member
    - California Plein-Air Revival – which began in the 1980s
- Tonalism – painting of landscapes with an overall tone of colored atmosphere or mist, although Eytel's work does not have dark, neutral hues such as gray, brown or blue
  - California Tonalism
  - Tonal Impressionism

Literature topics:

- Outdoor literature
- Travel literature

Desert topics:

- Coachella Valley – part of the "low desert" in which Eytel lived
- Deserts of California
- Little San Bernardino Mountains, which contain the Joshua Tree National Monument, are north of the Coachella Valley – some of Eytel's travels took him into this area below the California "high desert" (Mojave Desert)
- Puebloan people – Native Americans in the Southwestern pueblos
- Santa Rosa and San Jacinto Mountains – where Eytel painted many of his mountain scenes
- Southwest Museum of the American Indian – founded by Eytel's friend Charles Fletcher Lummis in 1905
