= Townie Bagels =

Bagel shop in Palm Springs, California, U.S.

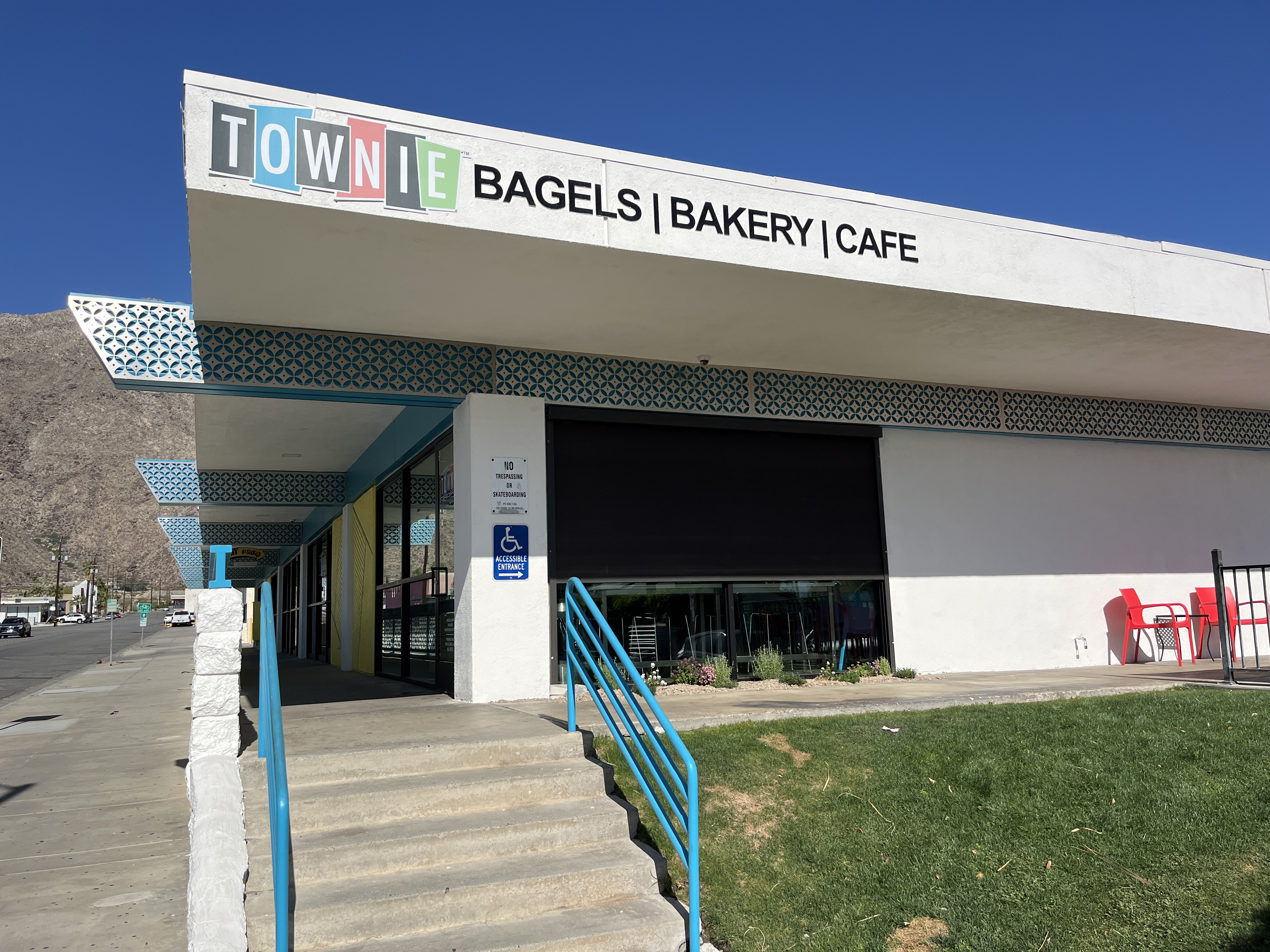
- The shop's exterior, 2024
- Interactive map of Townie Bagels

Restaurant information
- Owner: Andy Wysocki
- Location: Palm Springs, California, United States
- Coordinates: 33.8122°N 116.5413°W

Townie Bagels is a bagel shop in Palm Springs, California.

== Description ==
Townie Bagels is a bagel shop in the Warm Sands neighborhood of Palm Springs. In addition to boiled and baked bagels, the shop offers bagel sandwiches, breads, and espresso drinks. Among 22 varieties of bagels are black Russian, cinnamon raisin, and poppy seed; flavors available on weekends only include olive fennel and pretzel. Spreads include spicy jalapeño or veggie cream cheese.

== History ==
Townie Bagels initially sold food at farmers' markets. The brick and mortar shop opened in 2015, in a space previously occupied by Tlaquepaque. Andy Wysocki is a co-owner and the lead baker.

== Reception ==
The Desert Sun has said, "This is the most underrated fast-casual breakfast spot in town."

== See also ==
- List of bakeries
