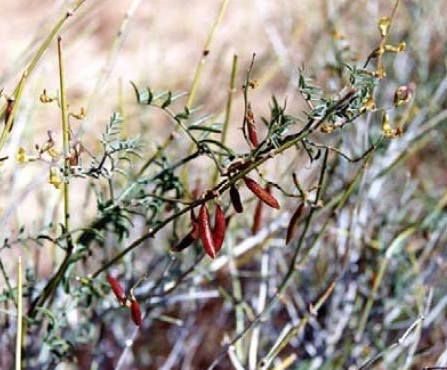

Conservation status
- Endangered (ESA)

Scientific classification
- Kingdom: Plantae
- Clade: Tracheophytes
- Clade: Angiosperms
- Clade: Eudicots
- Clade: Rosids
- Order: Fabales
- Family: Fabaceae
- Subfamily: Faboideae
- Genus: Astragalus
- Species: A. jaegerianus

Binomial name
- Astragalus jaegerianus Munz

= Astragalus jaegerianus =

Species of legume

Astragalus jaegerianus is a rare species of milkvetch known by the common name Lane Mountain milkvetch. The plant was named for the biologist Edmund Jaeger, who first documented it in 1939.

== Distribution ==
It is endemic to northeastern San Bernardino County, California, where it is known from only four populations in the vicinity of Fort Irwin in the Mojave Desert. It is a federally listed endangered species.

== Description ==
This is a perennial herb with thin stems coated in scaly hairs. The stems reach 30 to 70 centimeters in length and grow tangled in the herbage of adjacent shrubs. In dry years the plant grows only a few centimeters long before flowering, but after abundant rain it may climb to the tops of neighboring shrubs. The leaves are 2 to 5 centimeters long and are made up of several widely spaced narrow leaflets with hairy upper surfaces.

The inflorescence is an open array of up to 15 pale purple, dark veined flowers. Each flower is up to one centimeter in length. The flowers are insect-pollinated, with the most common pollinator being the megachilid bee Anthidium dammersi. The fruit is a hanging legume pod up to 2.5 centimeters long. It is hairless and dries to a leathery or thick papery texture.
