= Peter Wild =

American historian and poet (1940–2009)

- Born: Peter T. Wild; April 25, 1940; Northampton, Massachusetts, US
- Died: February 23, 2009 (aged 68); Tucson, Arizona, US
- Education: University of Arizona (B.A. & M.A.), University of California, Irvine (M.F.A.)
- Occupations: Professor of English; poet; writer
- Spouse(s): Sylvia Ortiz (1966–?), Rosemary Harrold (1981–?)
- Writing career
- Period: 1969–2009
- Genres: poetry, American history
- Subject: American Southwest
- Notable work: Cochise (1973)
- Notable awards: Writer's Digest prize, 1964; Ark River Review prize, 1972 nominated, Pulitzer Prize in Poetry, 1973

Peter T. Wild (April 25, 1940 – February 23, 2009) was a poet, historian, and professor of English at the University of Arizona in Tucson, Arizona. Born in Northampton, Massachusetts, he grew up in and graduated from high school in Easthampton, Massachusetts.

Wild worked as a rancher and firefighter for the U.S. Forest Service, and served as a lieutenant with the U.S. Army in Germany. Wild earned his M.F.A. in 1969 from the University of California, Irvine. He then began teaching for nearly 40 years and wrote over 2,000 poems; also, he edited or wrote some 80 fiction and non-fiction books, largely dealing with the American West.

His 1973 volume of poetry, Cochise, a eulogy to the Chiricahua Apache Indians and their leader Cochise, was nominated for the Pulitzer Prize in Poetry.

== Bibliography ==
- Poetry
  - Sonnets. San Francisco: Cranium Press. 1967. p. 24.
  - The Afternoon in Dismay. Cincinnati, OH: Art Association of Cincinnati. 1968. p. 87. OCLC 678909.
  - Wild's Magical Book of Cranial Effusions. New York: The Little Press & New Rivers Press. 1971. ISBN 091228417X.
  - Peligros. Ithaca, NY: Ithaca House. 1971. ISBN 0878860088.
  - Cochise. Garden City, NY: Doubleday. 1973. p. 107. ISBN 978-0385057929. OCLC 707537.
  - New and Selected Poems. (with Matthews, William (introduction); Eddy, Deborah (illustrations)). New York: New Rivers Press (distributor: Serendipity Books). 1973. p. 175. ISBN 978-0912284408. OCLC 749520, 806553940 (print and on-line)
  - The Cloning. Garden City, NY: Doubleday. 1974. pp. 103. ISBN 978-0385075916. OCLC 934541, 581527653, 297449896 (print and on-line)
  - Chichuahua. Garden City, NY: Doubleday & Co. 1976. ISBN 0385114524.
  - Wilderness. Hannah Hinchman (illustrations). Kensington, CA: New Rivers Press. 1980. ISBN 0898230144.
  - Jeanne D'Arc. Memphis, TN: Raccoon Books, St. Luke's Press. 1980. ISBN 0918518121.
  - New Poetry of the American West. Durango, CO: Logbridge-Rhodes. 1982. pp. 104. ISBN 978-0937406199. OCLC 8589531, 655452420, 610178960 (Editor, with Frank Graziano; print and on-line)
  - The Light on Little Mormon Lake. Point Reyes Station: Floating Island Publications. 1984. ISBN 0912449101.
- University of Utah Press – Salt Lake City (as editor)
  - Wild, Peter (1991). The Desert Reader: Descriptions of America's Arid Regions. University of Utah Press. p. 263. ISBN 978-0874803662. OCLC 22491262.
    - Republished as: Wild, Peter (2006). The New Desert Reader: Descriptions of America's Arid Regions. University of Utah Press. pp. 324. ISBN 978-0874808711. OCLC 266084402.
  - Dyke, John Charles Van (1993). The Autobiography of John C. Van Dyke: A Personal Narrative of American Life, 1861–1931. University of Utah Press. pp. 324. ISBN 0874803926. OCLC 28025404.
  - Into the Wilderness Dream: Explorations Narratives of the American West, 1500–1805. with Barclay, Donald A. & Maguire, James H. (eds.). 1994. p. 416. ISBN 0874804434. OCLC 29221605.
  - A Rendezvous Reader: Tall, Tangled, and True Tales of the Mountain Men, 1805–1850. with Barclay, Donald A. & Maguire, James H. (eds.). University of Utah Press. 1997. p. 348. ISBN 978-0874805390. OCLC 36726740, 44964200 (print and on-line)
  - Wild, Peter (2007). The Grumbling Gods: a Palm Springs Reader. University of Utah Press. p. 251. ISBN 978-0874808995. OCLC 122974473, 608203796, 608020250 (print and on-line)
- Boise State University Western Writers Series (BSUWWS #) – Boise, Idaho
  - Alberto Ríos (#131). 1998. pp. 51. ISBN 978-0884301301. OCLC 40252765, 246369356
  - Álvar Núñez Cabeza de Vaca (#101). 1991. pp. 51. ISBN 978-0884301004. OCLC 24515951, 656314379 (print and on-line)
  - Ann Zwinger (#111). 1993. pp. 51. ISBN 978-0884301103. OCLC 28516925
  - Barry Lopez (#94). 1984. pp. 49. ISBN 978-0884300380. OCLC 10984800
  - Clarence King (#48). 1981. pp. 46. ISBN 978-0884300724. OCLC 7628120
  - Desert Literature: The Early Period (#146). 2001. pp. 51. ISBN 978-0884301455. OCLC 46683491
  - Desert Literature: The Middle Period: J. Smeaton Chase, Edna Brush Perkins, and Edwin Corle (#138). 1999. pp. 53. ISBN 978-0884301370. OCLC 42076940
  - Desert Literature: The Modern Period (#144). 2000. pp. 52. ISBN 978-0884301431. OCLC 44641313
  - Enos Mills (#36). Cover design and illustration by Arny Skov. 1979. pp. 47. ISBN 978-0884300601. OCLC 6006498
  - George Wharton James (#93). 1990. pp. 52. ISBN 978-0884300922. OCLC 22357424, 754890912
  - J. Ross Browne (#157). 2003. pp. 49. ISBN 978-0884301578. OCLC 50722235
  - James Welch (#57). 1983. pp. 49. ISBN 978-0884300311. OCLC 10086364
  - John C. Van Dyke: The Desert (#82). 1988. pp. 52. ISBN 978-0884300816. OCLC 18596618
  - John Haines (#68). 1985. pp. 51. ISBN 978-0884300427. OCLC 12672075
  - John Nichols (#75). 1986. pp. 52. ISBN 978-0884300496. OCLC 14712741
  - Theodore Strong Van Dyke (#121). 1995. pp. 54. ISBN 978-0884301202. OCLC 33054151
- The Shady Myrick Research Project – Johannesburg, California
  - Desert Magazine: The Henderson Years. 2004. p. 112. OCLC 56193617.
  - J. Smeaton Chase. 2005. p. 211. OCLC 62232191.
  - Marshal South, of Yaquitepec. 2005. p. 157. OCLC 58796769.
  - News from Palm Springs: The Letters of Carl Eytel, Edmund C. Jaeger, J. Smeaton Chase, Charles Francis Saunders, and Others of the Creative Brotherhood and Its Background. Vol. I and II. 2007. OCLC 163456618.
  - Tipping the Dream: A Brief History of Palm Springs. 2007. p. 228. OCLC 152590848.
  - William Pester: The Hermit of Palm Springs. 2008. p. 161. OCLC 234084689.
- Other publishers:
  - Pioneer Conservations of Western America. Abbey, Edward (introduction). Missoula, MN: Mountain Press Pub. Co. 1979. pp. 247. ISBN 978-0878421077. OCLC 4114529, 752883606 (print and on-line)
  - The Secret Life of John C. Van Dyke: Selected Letters. Western Literature Series. Teague, David W. Reno: University of Nevada Press. 1997. p. 165. ISBN 978-0874172942. OCLC 35928275, 605037003 (print and on-line)
  - Daggett: Life in a Mojave Frontier. Van Dyke, Dix. Baltimore, MD: Johns Hopkins University Press. pp. 183. ISBN 978-0801856259. OCLC 36178998, 605563047, 658057160 (print and on-line)
  - The Opal Desert: Explorations of Fantasy and Reality in the American Southwest. Austin: University of Texas Press. 1999. p. 219. ISBN 978-0292791299. OCLC 40762502, 649978425 (print and on-line)
  - Different Travellers, Different Eyes: Artists' Narratives of the American West, 1820–1920. edited with Barclay, Donald A. and Maquire, James H. Fort Worth: Texas Christian University. 2001. p. 270. ISBN 978-0875652429. OCLC 46858598.
  - Paradise of Desire: Eleven Palm Springs Novels. Tucson, AZ: Estate of Peter Wild. 2011. p. 281. OCLC 748584112.
  - Heiress of Doom: Lois Kellogg of Palm Springs. Tucson, AZ: Estate of Peter Wild. 2011. p. 449. OCLC 748583736.

== Notes ==
- Peters, Robert (October–November 1974). "Mud Men Mud Women". Margins. Vol. 14. pp. 57 ff.
  - Republished in Robert Peters (1979). The Great American Poetry Bake-off. Metuchen, NJ: Scarecrow Press. pp. 274. ISBN 978-0810812314. OCLC 5101106, 643676039 (print and on-line)
- Seavey, Ormond (Spring 1975). "Peter Wild: An Introduction". New York: Little Magazine. Vol. 9, pp. 4–10. (Available in the Little Magazine archive, 1965–1988, at the Harry Ransom Humanities Research Center (HRC): University of Texas at Austin, OCLC 78144730.)
