= John Charles Van Dyke =

American art historian, critic, and writer (1856–1932)

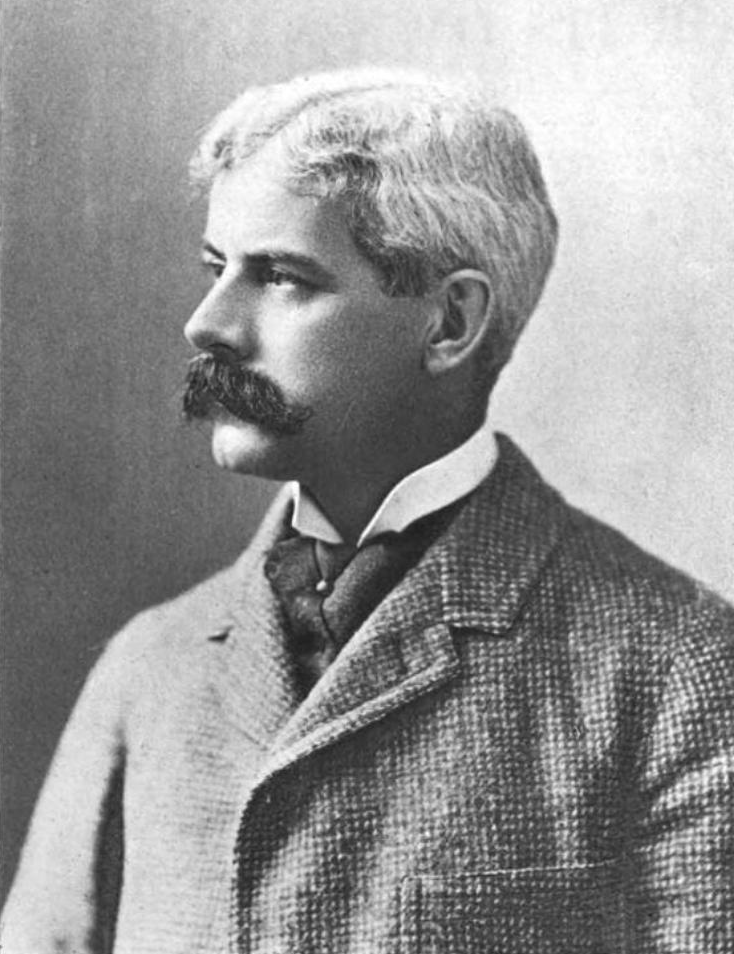
- Born: April 21, 1856; New Brunswick, New Jersey
- Died: December 5, 1932 (aged 76); New York, New York
- Education: Columbia University
- Occupations: Art historian, critic, nature writer

John Charles Van Dyke (1856–1932) was an American art historian, critic, and nature writer.

== Biography ==
John Charles Van Dyke was born at New Brunswick, New Jersey on April 21, 1856. He studied at Columbia, and for many years in Europe. He was admitted to the New York State Bar Association in 1877, but never practiced law.

In 1878, Van Dyke was appointed the assistant librarian of the Gardner Sage Library at the New Brunswick Theological Seminary, and in 1886 as librarian. Russell Gasero describes him as one of those "extraordinary men who appear in the right place at the right time," and suggests that Van Dyke "developed Sage into the excellent research facility that it is today."

In 1891 Van Dyke also became professor of art history at Rutgers College (now Rutgers, The State University of New Jersey). With his appointment, the Rutgers president's residence was converted to classroom and studio space for the college's Department of Fine Arts. He was elected to the National Institute of Arts and Letters in 1908.

Van Dyke wrote a series of critical guide books: New Guides to Old Masters. He edited Modern French Masters (1896); Old Dutch and Flemish Masters (1901); Old English Masters; and a series of histories covering the history of art in America.

In 1901, he published The Desert: Further Studies in Natural Appearances. On its influence, historian Peter Wild wrote,

largely through The Desert the nation "discovered" the Southwest, its Indians, strange plants, and exotic animals. Discovered, too, the first and still the best book to praise the arid lands. After nearly a century Van Dyke remains the grandfather of almost all American desert writers.

Van Dyke died at St. Luke's Hospital in Manhattan on December 5, 1932.

He was the son of Judge John Van Dyke, and great grandson of John Honeyman, a spy for George Washington who played a critical role at the battle of Trenton. He was also the uncle of film director W.S. Van Dyke.

== Publications ==
- Books and How to Use Them (1883)
- How to Judge a Picture (1888)
- Art for Art's Sake (1893)
- A History of Painting (1894; new edition, 1915)
- Rembrandt and his school; a critical study of the master and his pupils with a new assignment of their pictures (1923)
- The Meadows: Familiar Studies of the Commonplace (1926)
- Nature for its Own Sake (1898; fourth edition, 1906)
- The Desert: Further Studies in Natural Appearances. New York City: C. Scribner's Sons. 1918 [1903]. p. 233. OCLC 1841296. OCLC 4733802 With J. Smeaton Chase (photographs – 1918 ed.) (1980 ed. Gibbs M. Smith, Inc. / Peregrine Smith Books: Salt Lake City, xxvii + 233|) (ISBN 0-87905-073-X) (Gutenberg)
- The meaning of pictures (1903)
- The Opal Sea: Continued Studies in Impressions and Appearances (1906)
- Studies in Pictures (1907)
- The Money God (1908) (ISBN 0-46931-690-X)
- What is Art? (1910)
- The Raritan: Notes on a River and a Family (1915)
- The Mountain (1916)
- American Painting and its Tradition (1919)
- The Grand Canyon of the Colorado (1920)
- The Open Spaces: Incidents of Nights and Days under the Blue Sky (1922)
- In the West Indies (1932)
- The Autobiography of John C. Van Dyke: A Personal Narrative of American Life, 1861–1931. Salt Lake City: University of Utah Press. 1993. pp. 320. ISBN 978-0874803921. OCLC 28025404. Edited by Peter Wild
  - Ingham, Zita (March 22, 1995). "The Autobiography of John C. Van Dyke: A Personal Narrative of American Life, 1861–1931". Nineteenth-Century Prose. Archived from the original on June 8, 2014 – via HighBeam Research.
