= Maichingen =

- Stadtteil of Sindelfingen
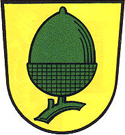
- Coat of arms
- Interactive map of Maichingen
- Location within Germany Location within Baden-Württemberg
- Coordinates: 48°43′27″N 8°57′53″E
- Country: Germany
- State: Baden-Württemberg
- Admin. region: Stuttgart
- District: Böblingen
- Town: Sindelfingen

Area
  - Total: 7.44 km^{2} (2.87 sq mi)
- Elevation: 460 m (1,510 ft)
- Time zone: UTC+01:00 (CET)
  - Summer (DST): UTC+02:00 (CEST)
- Postal codes: 71069
- Dialling codes: 07031
- Vehicle registration: BB
- Website: www.maichingen.de

Maichingen (German pronunciation: [ˈmaɪ̯çɪŋən]) is a village in Baden-Württemberg, Germany. It is part of the town of Sindelfingen.

== History ==
=== Early history ===
The first traces of settlement in the area of Maichingen date from the 4th millennium BC. BC, when a Neolithic settlement existed in the area of today's residential area "Sträuble-Propstei". A Roman manor in the area of this same Stone Age settlement, which dates from the second century AD, is around 4,000 years younger. A row grave field dated to the 6th century in the area of the old church testifies to Alemannic settlement activity. In 830, the noble Erlafried donated goods to the Hirsau monastery in the area of what would later become Maichingen.

=== Middle Ages ===
The first documentary mention of the place dates back to 1075. In a document, king Heinrich IV confirmed that Hirsau Monastery also owned the property in Maichingen, which was then called Mouchingen.

On March 31, 1273, the first parish of Maichingen is mentioned. The parish connected with Hirsau Abbey in 1348, who purchased the Widernhof. Along with the procurement of the farm, the Abbey also obtained the Kastvogtei and the patronage law, i.e. the right to represent and protect the church in Maichingen as well as to appoint the pastor.

Maichingen then changed hands several times and at times belonged to the Hirsau Abbey, the Count Palatine of Tübingen, the Lords of Maichingen and those of Rohr. During the second half of the 14th century, the House of Württemberg acquired the place. Maichingen was assigned to the Oberamt Böblingen. In 1850 Maichingen had 1,129 Protestant and one Catholic residents who lived and worked in 147 main and 127 auxiliary buildings.

=== Recent history ===
In 1971, Maichingen was incorporated into the city of Sindelfingen.

== Local businesses ==
- Helmut Fischer GmbH
- KARCOMA Armaturen GmbH
- Körner Druck GmbH & Co. KG
- Adolf Schnorr GmbH & Co. KG
- Solo Kleinmotoren GmbH
- Gottlob Stahl Wäschereimaschinenbau GmbH

== Main sights ==
=== Buildings ===
- Laurentiuskirche (Protestant church), built for the first time around the year 1000.
- Altes Rathaus (Old town hall), built around 1540 and in 1774 the small tower was added. It was used as the town hall until it was incorporated, then as a district office until 1981. From 1983 to 1985 it was renovated. Today it is used by the German Child Protection Association as a child and family center.
- Alte Schule (Old School)
- Widdumhaus
- Pfarrhaus
- Bürgerhaus (New town hall), built by the city of Sindelfingen between 1979 and 1981 in accordance with the incorporation agreement. In the right wing there are the district administration rooms, meeting rooms, library, German red cross and seniority meeting rooms, in the left wing the ballrooms for up to 570 people, the rehearsal rooms of the clubs and the caretaker's apartment. 70 cars can be parked in the underground car park.
- Kriegerdenkmal
- Gasthof Adler
- Digelhof

=== Natural sights ===
- Hoher Baum (Tall tree), a 22 m high winter linden tree with a trunk circumference of 5.17 m and a diameter of 1.65 m (as of 1999), which was planted around 1600 (geographical coordinates: ° 43 ′ 47 ″ N, 8 ° 56 ′ 42 ″ O)

== Educational institutes ==
There is a primary and combined secondary school, the Johannes-Widmann-School, as well as a grammar school called Gymnasium Unterrieden.

== Famous persons from Maichingen ==
- Carl Eytel (1862–1925), desert artist who immigrated to America in 1885 and eventually settled in Palm Springs, California
- Roland Emmerich (1955– ), movie director, grew up in Maichingen
