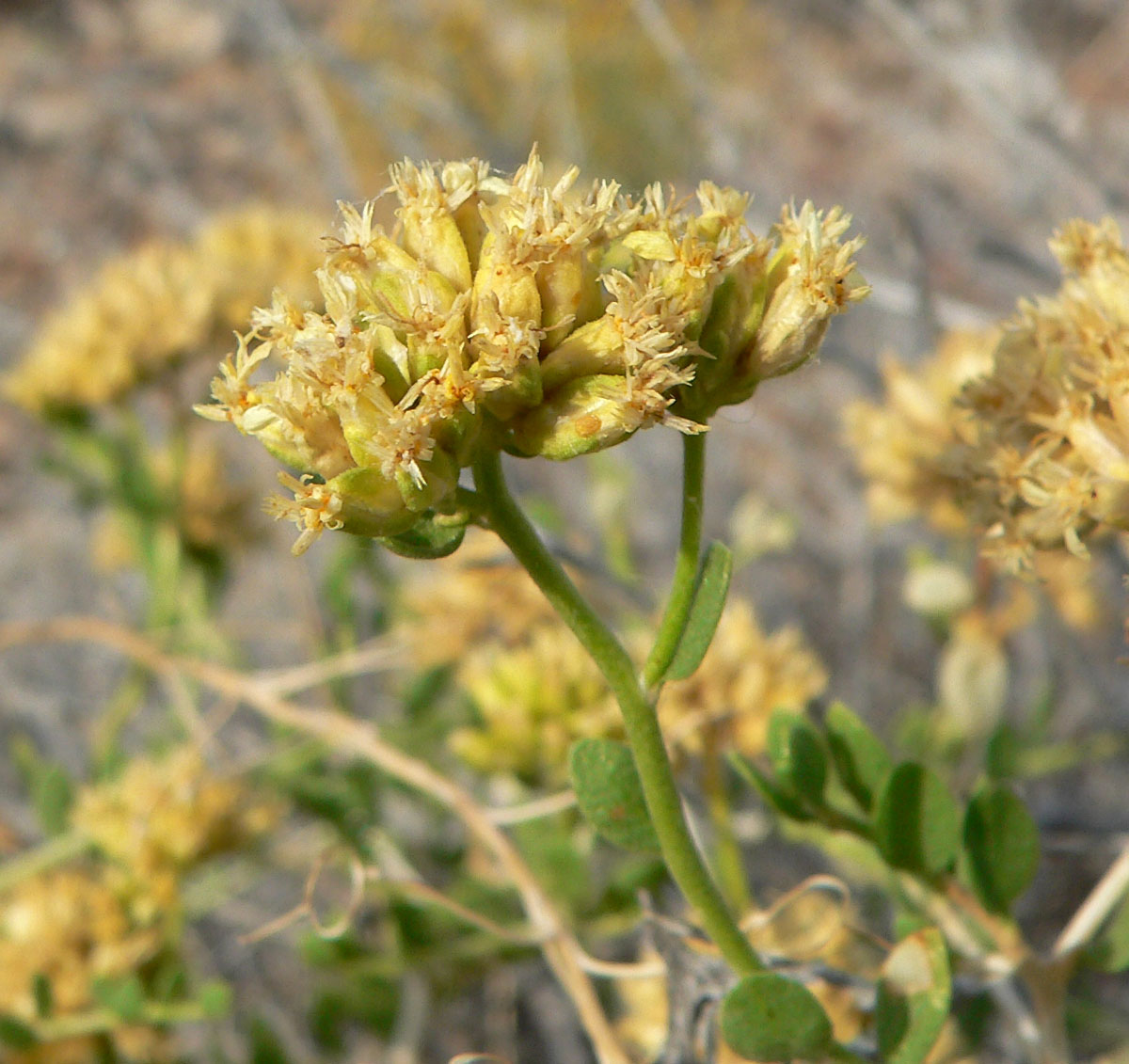

Conservation status
- Secure (NatureServe)

Scientific classification
- Kingdom: Plantae
- Clade: Tracheophytes
- Clade: Angiosperms
- Clade: Eudicots
- Clade: Asterids
- Order: Asterales
- Family: Asteraceae
- Subfamily: Asteroideae
- Tribe: Astereae
- Subtribe: Solidagininae
- Genus: Amphipappus; Torr. & A.Gray
- Species: A. fremontii

Binomial name
- Amphipappus fremontii Torr. & A.Gray

Synonyms
- Amphiachyris fremontii (Torr. & A.Gray) A.Gray; Gutierrezia fremontii (Torr. & A.Gray) Benth.; Amphiachyris spinosa (A.Nelson) A.Nelson; Amphipappus spinosus (A.Nelson) A.Nelson

= Amphipappus =

Genus of flowering plants

Amphipappus is a North American genus in the family Asteraceae. It is native to desert regions of the southwestern United States, in southern California, southern Nevada, Arizona, and southeastern Utah.

There is only one known species Amphipappus fremontii. It is a shrub up to 60 cm (23.5 in) tall. The flower heads are yellow and have both ray florets and disc florets. Its rounded clumps are scattered about dry, rocky areas.

The species takes its scientific epithet, fremontii from John C. Frémont, and is known commonly by the names chaffbush or eytelia (in honor of artist Carl Eytel).
