= Calico Print =

Former newspaper in California

The Calico Print was a newspaper, established in 1882 and published during the heyday of the silver mining camp of Calico, California prior to 1902. The Calico Print was also the name of a monthly, later bi-monthly, periodical of the mid-20th century, and contained "Tales and trails of the desert West."

== Revival history ==
=== 1930s ===
The Calico Print revival was established by Grail Fuller and Lucille Coke in the 1930s as a monthly tabloid, reprinting articles from the original newspaper as well as original material. It was sold primarily for visitors to Walter Knott's rebuilt Calico Ghost Town.

=== 1950s ===
With the November, 1950, issue of Calico Print, Harold and Lucile Weight, former staff editors at Desert Magazine, became the principal editors. They produced 17 monthly issues in the tabloid form. But the Weights had slipped back into the same deadline-driven routine that drove them from Desert Magazine, forcing them to neglect their efforts to record the stories and history of rapidly disappearing desert pioneers.

To cope with that, periodicity of Calico Print was changed to one every two months and the format was changed to that of a slick illustrated digest size magazine. Nine issues of Calico Print in magazine form were issued from June 1952 through November 1953 by the Weight's Calico Press in Twentynine Palms, California. These nine issues, packed with detailed desert history, are now highly prized by desert enthusiasts. In addition to articles authored by the Weights, there are contributions from other noted writers – Adelaide Arnold, L. Burr Belden, Ed Rochester, Edmund C. Jaeger, Jerry Laudermilk, Charles F. Lummis, Arthur Woodward, Senator Charles Brown, Harry Oliver, Ruth Kirk, and more.

In the nine-issue run of Calico Print, in its magazine format, a so-called "Folio" section is included in several of the issues. Of special interest among these Folios is the one devoted to an exhaustive study of Wm. B. Rood, of Death Valley pioneer fame, published in the Aug–Sept 1952. Other such Folios covered the Comstock Lode (June 1952); Belmont, Nevada (Oct–Nov 1952); Greenwater, California (January 1953); The Great Survey (March 1953); the Kofa Mountains and King Mine of Arizona (May 1953); New Almaden, California's Oldest Mine (July 1953); and the legends of the Lost Ship of the Desert (November 1953).

The Calico Print was discontinued at the end of 1953, and the Weights concentrated on their occasional Southwest Panomama series of books on desert history.

== See also ==
- The Tombstone Epitaph
- Desert Rat Scrap Book
- Overland Monthly
- Lost Ship of the Desert
- Ghost town
