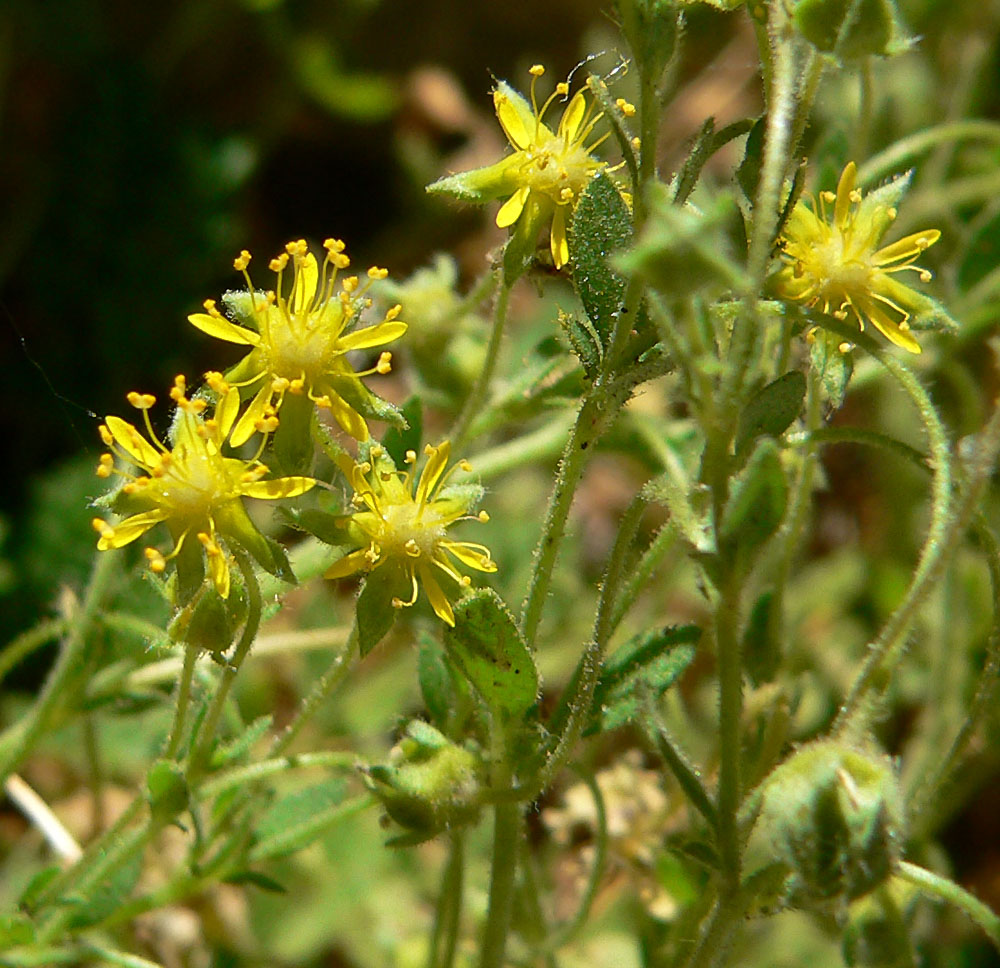

Scientific classification
- Kingdom: Plantae
- Clade: Tracheophytes
- Clade: Angiosperms
- Clade: Eudicots
- Clade: Rosids
- Order: Rosales
- Family: Rosaceae
- Genus: Potentilla
- Species: P. jaegeri

Binomial name
- Potentilla jaegeri (Munz & I.M.Johnst.) L.C.Wheeler

Synonyms
- Ivesia jaegeri Munz & I.M.Johnst.

= Potentilla jaegeri =

Species of flowering plant

Potentilla jaegeri (Ivesia jaegeri), also known as Jaeger's mousetail and Jaeger's ivesia, is an uncommon species of flowering plant in the rose family.

It is native to the Mojave Desert in southwestern Nevada, and it is also known from two occurrences nearby in California. It grows in cracks and crevices in the limestone cliffs and slopes of the desert mountains.

== Description ==
Potentilla jaegeri is a perennial herb that grows in matted clumps of glandular foliage. The leaves and thin, naked stems hang from their purchase on steep cliffs. Each leaf is a strip of oval-shaped green leaflets.

The stems bear inflorescences of clustered flowers. Each flower has triangular sepals with tiny oval-shaped yellow petals between them. The center of the flower contains twenty stamens and a few pistils.
