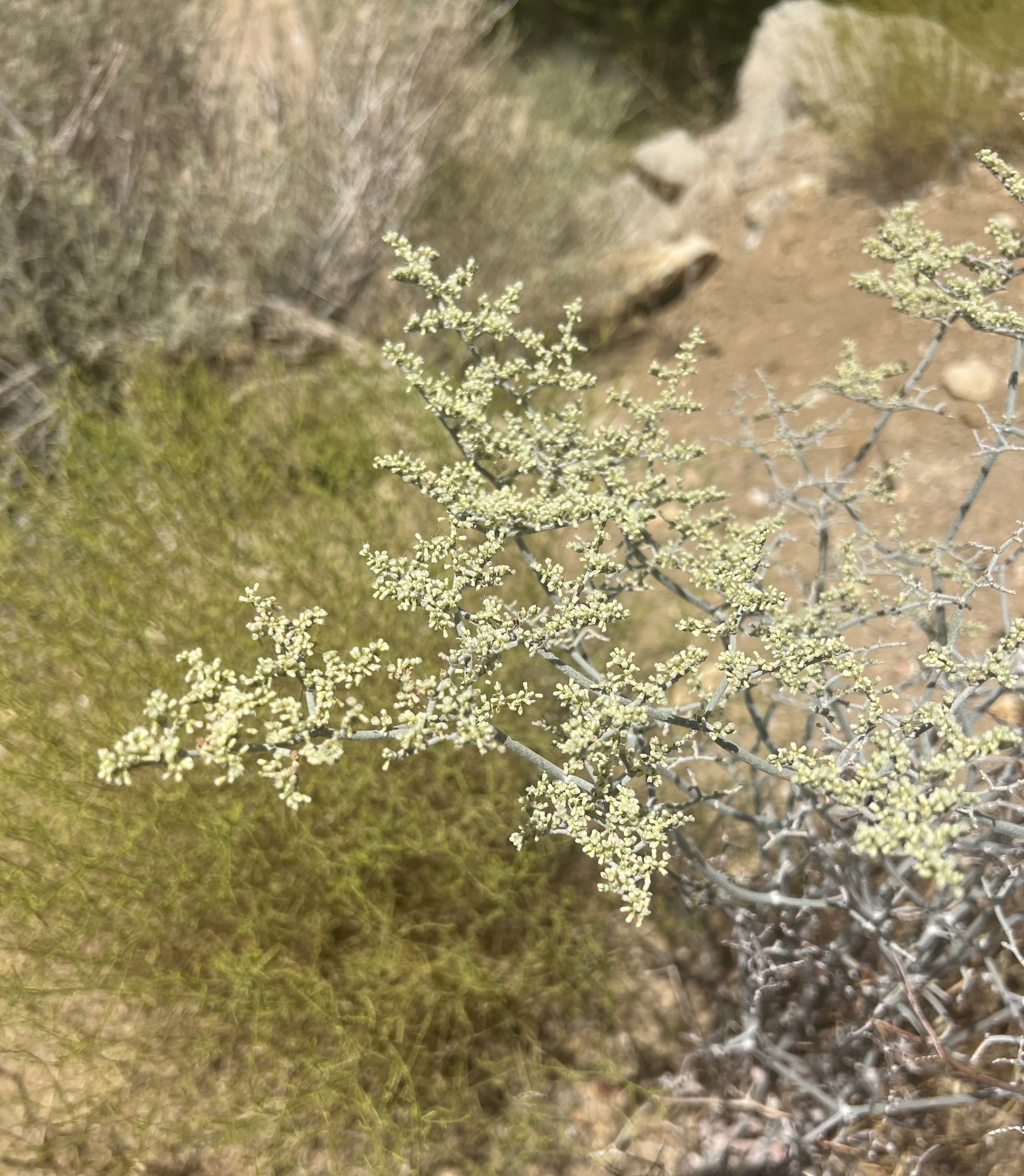

Scientific classification
- Kingdom: Plantae
- Clade: Tracheophytes
- Clade: Angiosperms
- Clade: Eudicots
- Order: Caryophyllales
- Family: Polygonaceae
- Genus: Eriogonum
- Species: E. plumatella

Binomial name
- Eriogonum plumatella Durand & Hilg.

= Eriogonum plumatella =

Species of wild buckwheat

Eriogonum plumatella is a species of wild buckwheat known by the common name yucca buckwheat. It is native to the desert southwest of the United States.

== Description ==
This is an erect shrub reaching a maximum of about 60 centimeters in height and having a narrow, nonspreading profile. Its branching inflorescence has small, woolly, oval-shaped leaves each about a centimeter long.

The top of the plant is occupied by flower clusters which sometimes appear as though arranged in horizontal layers. The flowers are generally pale yellow or white.

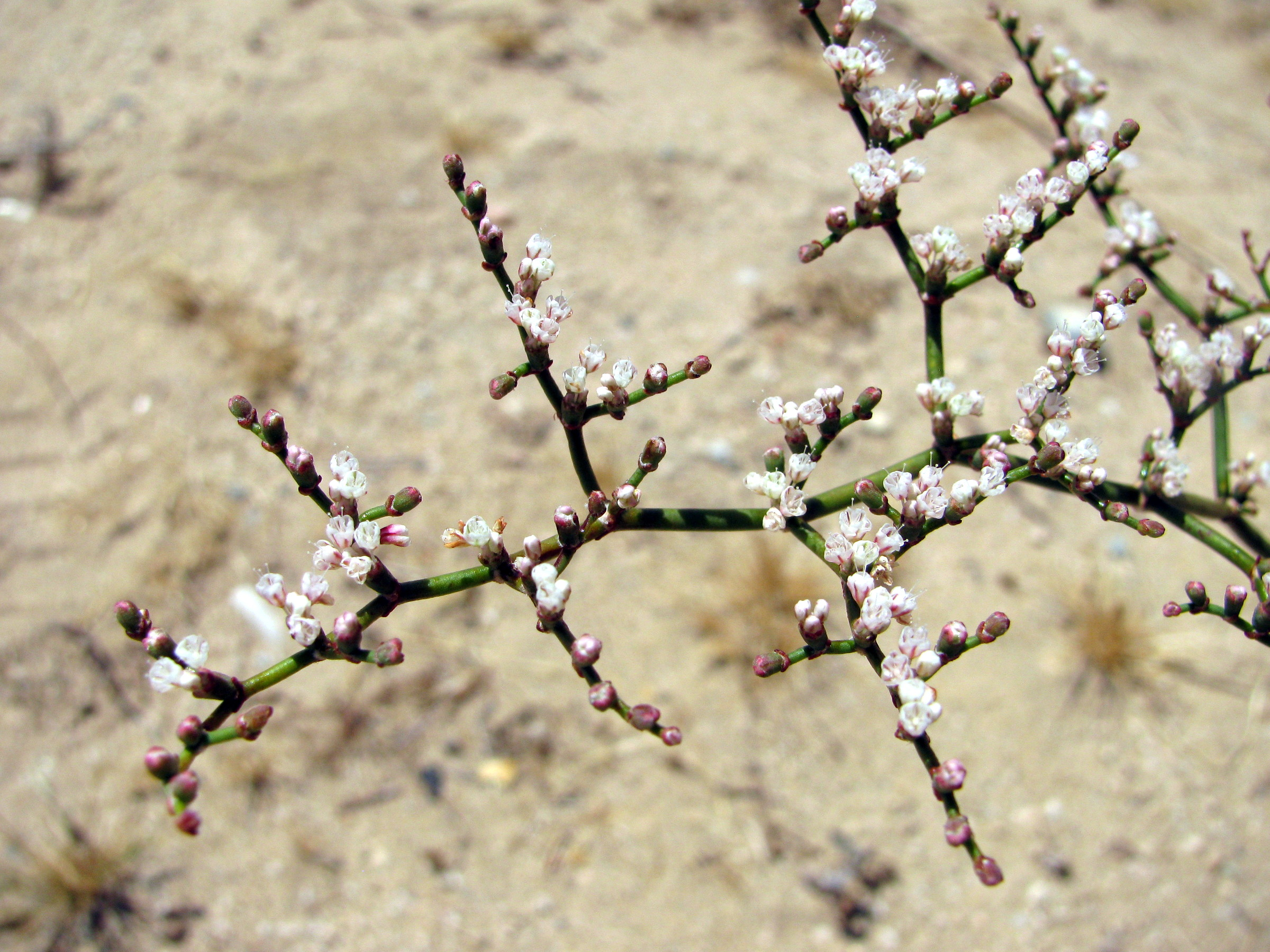
Yucca Buckwheat flowers opening, Joshua Tree, California, 2015
