= The Desert Sun =

Newspaper in Palm Springs, California

- Type: Daily newspaper
- Format: Broadsheet
- Owner: USA Today Co.
- Founder(s): Carl Barkow; Harvey Johnson
- Editor: Kate Franco
- Founded: 1927; 99 years ago
- Language: English
- Headquarters: 750 N. Gene Autry Trail; Palm Springs, California
- OCLC number: 26432381
- Website: desertsun.com
- Free online archives: cdnc.ucr.edu (1934–1989)

Former logo

The Desert Sun is a local daily newspaper serving Palm Springs and the surrounding Coachella Valley in Southern California.

== History ==
On August 5, 1927, the first edition of The Desert Sun was published by Carl Barkow and Harvey Johnson, owners of the Banning Record. By 1938, the paper had a staff of four and a circulation of 1,700. Barkow eventually gained sole ownership and sold the paper in 1946 to Oliver B. Jaynes. Soon Jaynes expanded the Sun from a weekly to a twice-weekly. He was joined by Ward J. Risvold as a partner in 1952.

The Desert Sun Publishing Co. incorporated in April 1955 and oil millionaire George E. Cameron Jr. joined Jaynes and Risvold as a joint owner. Cameron served as president, Risvold as publisher and Jaynes as editor. The paper expanded into a five-daily paper on October 4, 1955. In 1957, Jaynes retired. In 1962, the circulation had grown to 10, 607.

In 1967, Leonard K. Firestone, president and general manager of Firestone Tire and Rubber Company, bought the paper from Cameron. Two years later a flood destroyed the paper's printing plant. In 1974, The Evening News Association, owner of the Detroit News, bought the company.

In 1985, The Evening News Association, which owned the Palm Springs Desert Sun, Indigo Daily News, was acquired for $717 million by Gannett. At that time the Desert Sun had 30,871 subscribers and the Daily News had 9,116. A few years later the paper broke ground on a new $21 million printing plant. The Daily News was merged into the Sun in 1990.

On, September 20, 2020, The Desert Sun ran its printing presses for the final time. Print editions of paper are now printed in Phoenix at Gannett's co-owned Arizona Republic. On March 1, 2024, the paper's newsroom union went on strike to protest what it called bad faith bargaining from Gannett. The work stoppage was the first indefinite strike in the paper's history. The next day the union ended its strike after reaching a tentative contract agreement.

== See also ==
- Desert Magazine (published in Palm Desert), a monthly magazine covering desert topics
- Desert Daily Guide Magazine (published in Palm Springs), a weekly magazine covering LGBT topics for 22 years
- Palm Springs Tribune
