= Desert Rat Scrap Book =

Former humor publication in California (1945–1967)

Desert Rat Scrap Book, packet 2 of pouch 9

The Desert Rat Scrap Book (or DRSB) was a roughly quarterly Southwestern humor publication based in Thousand Palms, California. DRSB was published in editions of 10,000 to 20,000 copies whenever its creator, Harry Oliver, had sufficient material and enough money to pay the printer. Forty-six issues were printed and distributed via Southern California bookstores and newsstands and by mail worldwide. DRSB was devoted to the lore, legends, lies, and laughs of the American Southwest region, especially featuring prospectors and other "desert rats". The publication was active from late 1945 to early 1967.

== Harry Oliver's Desert Rat Scrap Book ==
In 1957, a spoken-word album titled Harry Oliver's Desert Rat Scrap Book was released. On the album, Oliver narrates sixteen stories from the publication. The album was distributed by his fellow KDES radio host John David Norman via his fictitious "Desert Records".

== See also ==
- Desert Steve Ragsdale
- Jimmy Swinnerton (artist)
- Desert Magazine
- The Tombstone Epitaph
- Calico Print (magazine)
