= J. Smeaton Chase =

English-born American author and photographer (1864–1923)

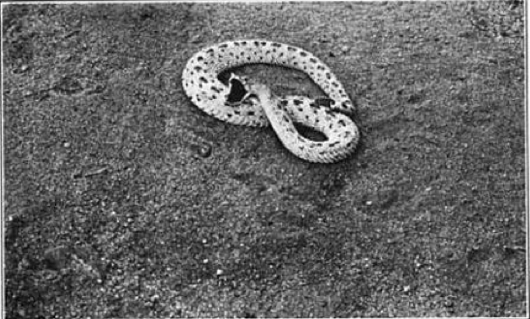
Sidewinder, from California Desert Trails, 1919

Joseph Smeaton Chase (8 April 1864 – 29 March 1923) was an English-born American author, traveler, and photographer. He has become an integral part of California literature: revered for his poignant descriptions of California landscapes. An Englishman who toured the Santa Rosa and San Jacinto mountains in 1915 with his burro, Mesquit, Chase published poetic diary entries detailing his escapades through the Sierra Nevada mountains and California desert.

== Life ==
Chase was born in Islington, now a London borough, in April 1864. He arrived in Southern California in 1890, although information surrounding his motive for doing so is sparse. It is known, however, that he lived on a mountainside and managed to obtain a job tutoring a wealthy rancher's children in the San Gabriel Valley. Chase was drawn to the plants, animals, and Spanish-speaking individuals who resided in California. Subsequently, in 1910 he took a trip with local painter Carl Eytel, travelling on horseback from Los Angeles to Laguna and then down to San Diego. Chase journeyed through the uncouth California land and detailed his escapades in his book California Desert Trails. He was passionate that the Santa Rosa and San Jacinto mountains be preserved as a national park. Chase appeals to readers who appreciate the unspoiled west and California history.

Chase died 29 March 1923, in Banning, California, after several years of poor health. His wife (Isabel, née White, 1876–1962) continued to live in Palm Springs. They are buried in the Welwood Murray Cemetery at the foot of Mt. San Jacinto in Palm Springs. Also his name is engraved at his parents' (Samuel and Jane) headstone in the St. Mary the Virgin Cemetery, London Borough of Bexley, England.

== Works ==
=== Books ===
By year first published:

- Cone-bearing Trees of the California Mountains. Chicago: A. C. McClurg & Co. 1911. pp. 99. ASIN B00086JHFA. LCCN 11004975. OCLC 3477527. With illustrations by Carl Eytel
- Yosemite Trails: Camp and Pack-train in the Yosemite Region of the Sierra Nevada. Boston: Houghton Mifflin. 1911. p. 354. OCLC 34014279. With illustrations from Chase's photographs – details his route through in the strikingly beautiful Sierra Nevada. He captures the land and the people with such vibrancy that the reader is absorbed by his depictions of majestic California landscapes.
  - Hotchkiss, C. W. (1911). "Review of Yosemite Trails". Bulletin of the American Geographical Society. 43 (12). New York City: American Geographical Society: 923. doi:10.2307/200470. ISSN 0190-5929. JSTOR 200470. OCLC 484246639. "...Chase writes with a buoyant intensity of appreciation and an exuberant imagination that cannot fail to strike fire from the duller sensibilities of the best of us."
  - "Review of Yosemite Trails". The Geographical Journal. 41 (1). Royal Geographical Society: 59–60. January 1913. ISSN 0016-7398. JSTOR 1778492. OCLC 482131286.
  - Yosemite Trails: Camp and Pack-train in the Yosemite Region of the Sierra Nevada. Palo Alto, California: Tioga Pub. Co. 1987. p. 354. ISBN 0935382585. LCCN 87040052. (with introduction to this edition and updated plant list by Carl Sharsmith)
- California Coast Trails: a Horseback Ride from Mexico to Oregon. Boston: Houghton Mifflin. 1913. p. 253. ISBN 978-1116315660. OCLC 49876561. LCC F866 .C48 In 1911, Chase journeyed 2,000 miles on horseback from Mexico to Oregon and intimately recorded his experiences along the way. In his journals, Chase poetically provides a glimpse of California's towns and wilderness as they appeared at the beginning of the 20th century.
  - Churchill, William (1913). "Review of California Coast Trails". Bulletin of the American Geographical Society. 45 (12). New York City: American Geographical Society: 932. doi:10.2307/200285. ISSN 0190-5929. JSTOR 200285. OCLC 484276219. "He who would best see the best of California must do so as did this author, mount a sturdy horse and follow the trails across mountain passes and through the valleys."
  - California Coast Trails: a Horseback Ride from Mexico to Oregon. Palo Alto, California: Tioga Pub. Co. 1987. p. 326. ISBN 0935382593. LCCN 87040051. (with introduction to this edition by John McKinney; updated plant list by Mabel Crittenden)
- The Penance of Magdalena: And Other Tales of the California Missions. Boston; New York: Houghton Mifflin Co. 1915. ISBN 1112149333. OCLC 6508078.
- California Desert Trails. Boston; New York: Houghton Mifflin Co. 1919. pp. 387. OCLC 2991395. With illustrations from Chase's photographs. Available at: Internet Archive: California Coast Trails
  - California Desert Trails. Palo Alto, California: Tioga Pub. Co. 1987. p. 387. ISBN 0935382607. LCCN 87040050. (with introduction to this edition by Richard Dillon; environmental perspective and updated plant list by Robert L. Moon)
- Our Araby: Palm Springs and the Garden of the Sun. Pasadena: Star–News Publishing Co. 1920. pp. 83. ISBN 0961872403. LCCN 24010428. OCLC 6169840. "republished 1987 by the Palm Springs Public Library" (Electronic copy) One of the first travel books of Palm Springs and the Coachella Valley. Describes the animals, plants, and Native Americans that resided in Palm Springs before it was transformed into a posh resort town.

=== Journals, co-author, and other ===
- Smeaton Chase, J. (March 25, 1906). "Cropping Animals' Ears". Folklore. 17 (1). London: Taylor & Francis, Ltd. on behalf of Folklore Enterprises, Ltd.: 72–73. doi:10.1080/0015587x.1906.9719721. ISSN 0015-587X. JSTOR 1254193. OCLC 479879892.
- Saunders, Charles Francis; Chase, J. Smeaton (1915). California Padres and Their Missions. Boston; New York: Houghton Mifflin. pp. 417. LCCN 15007137. OCLC 479631. (Available as pdf file from the HathiTrust Digital Library)
  - Wax, Marvin (1974). Mystique of the Missions; Photographic Impressions by Marvin Wax. Descriptive Passages by Charles Francis Saunders and J. Smeaton Chase, selected from The California Padres and Their Missions, published in 1915. An Images of America Series Book. Palo Alto, California: American West. ISBN 0910118531. LCCN 74077396. OCLC 1054455.
- Van Dyke, John Charles (1918). The Desert: Further Studies in Natural Appearances. Chase, J. Smeaton (photographs). New York City: C. Scribner's Sons. pp. 233. ASIN B00521GNDK. LCCN 18004124. OCLC 1841296. (Available as a pdf file from the HathiTrust Digital Library)
