= Desert Magazine =

- Categories: Regional magazine
- Frequency: Monthly
- Founder: Randall Henderson
- Founded: 1937
- Final issue: 1985
- Country: United States
- Based in: Palm Desert, California
- Language: English
- Website: mydesertmagazine.com
- ISSN: 0194-3405
- OCLC: 8807948

Desert Magazine was a monthly regional publication based in the Colorado Desert published between 1937 and 1985. A print version bearing the same name has been revived in the Coachella Valley town of Palm Desert near Palm Springs, California.

== History ==
=== Editors ===
Desert Magazine was founded, edited and published from 1937 to 1958 by Randall Henderson (1888–1970). New editors followed until the magazine closed print publication in 1985. It was revived as an on-line magazine in 2006.

=== Publication ===
The magazine focused on the desert country of the Southwestern United States and Northwestern Mexico, and covered a broad range of desert subjects including: regional travel and exploration; the visual arts of painting, drawing, and photography; prose and literature; cultural history; prospecting and mining; natural history including geology, wildlife, and flora; river running, and lifestyle–human interest stories.

=== Online magazine – revival ===
Desert Magazine was revived as an archival online magazine, the Desert Magazine e-zine journal, in 2006. It contains all the entries and illustrations that were published in print from 1937 to 1985. A newsblog is also produced about the magazine called the Desert Magazine Weblog.

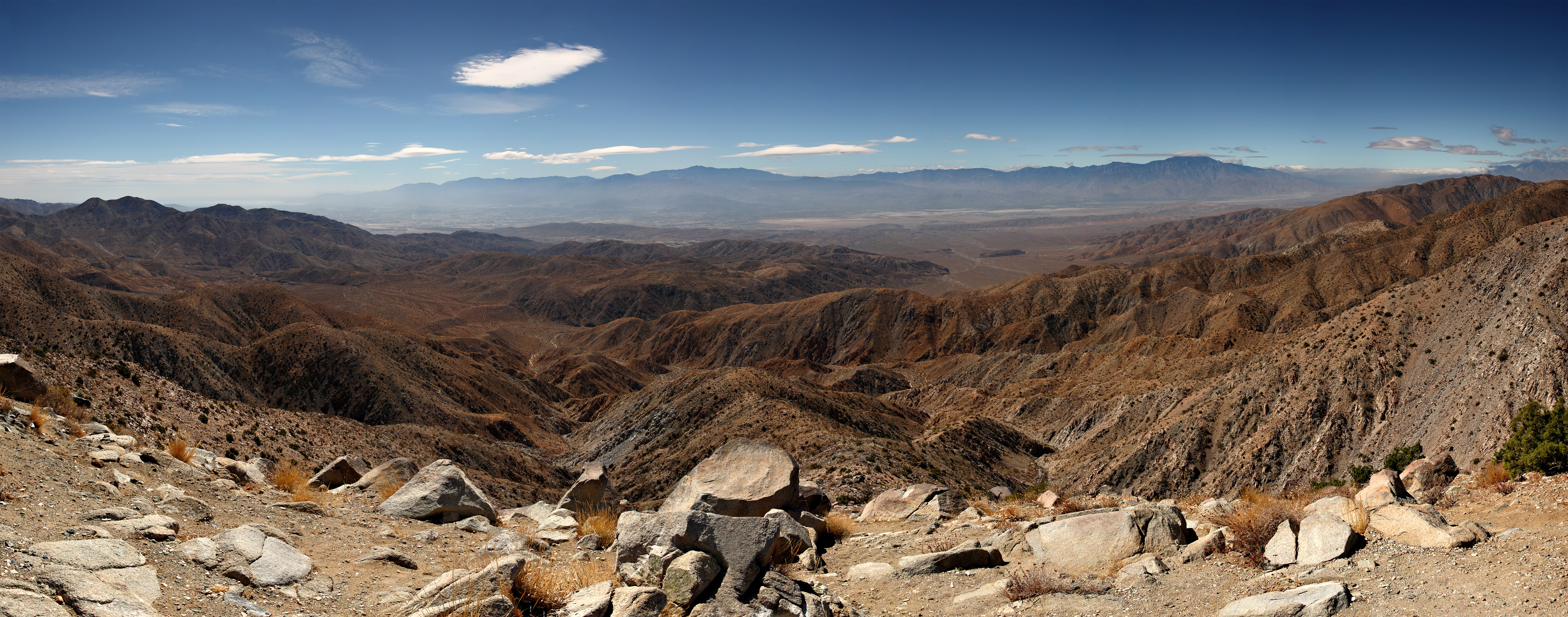
Desert panorama: view of Mojave Desert and Joshua Tree National Park.

=== Others ===
Desert Magazine is also the name of a monthly desert lifestyles magazine sent to subscribers to the Palm Springs daily newspaper The Desert Sun.

== See also ==
- Calico Print
- Desert Rat Scrap Book
- Jimmy Swinnerton – featured artist in magazine
- Jane S. Pinheiro - regular contributor on the subject of desert wildflowers
