= Glendale Library, Arts & Culture =

Group of libraries in California, US

Coordinates: 34.1439°N 118.2535°W

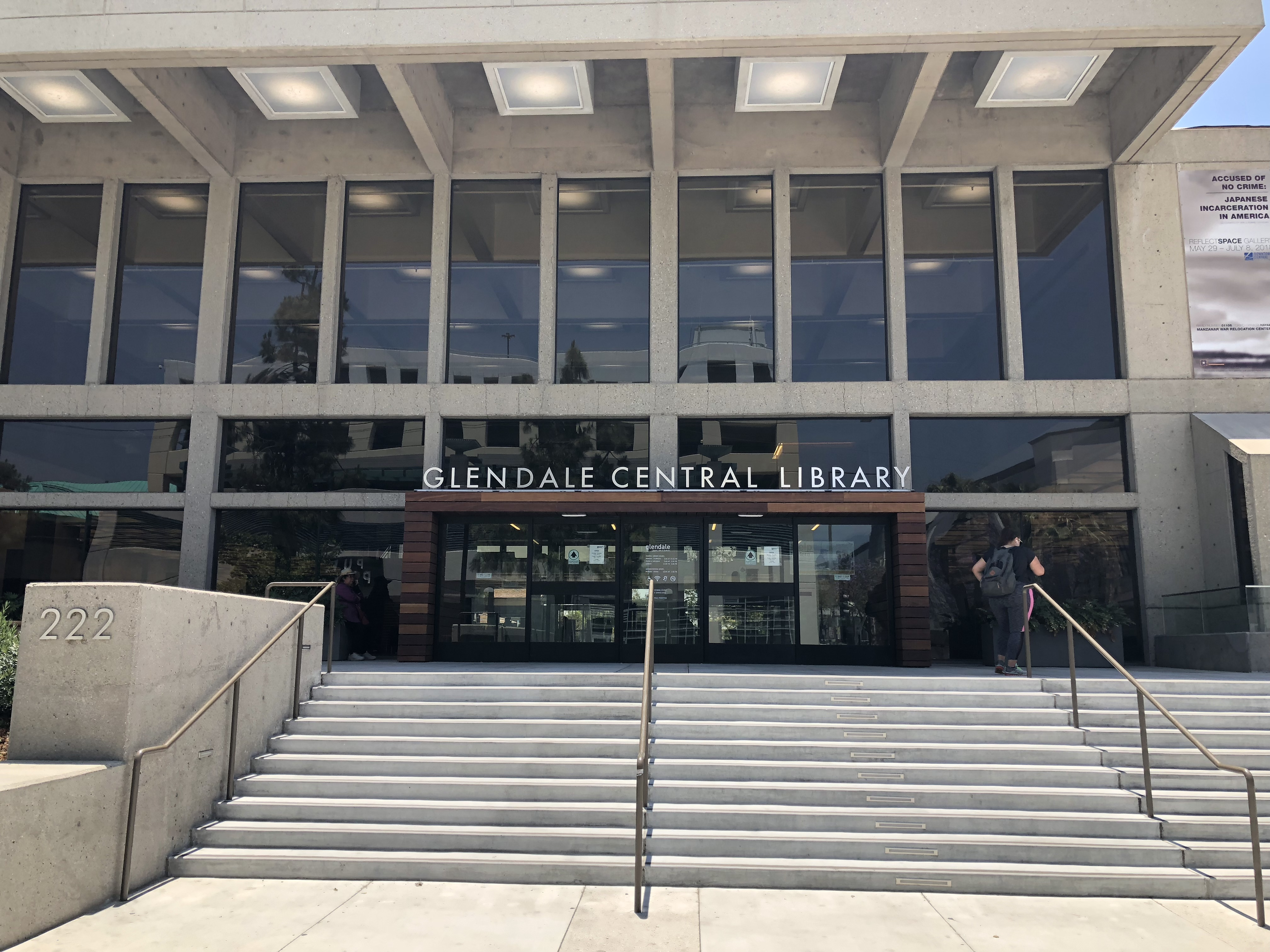
- Glendale Central Library
- Location: 222 E Harvard Street (Headquarters), Glendale, California, United States, 91205
- Type: Public library
- Established: 1907; 119 years ago
- Branches: 8

Collection
- Items collected: Books, audiobooks, LP records, maps, magazines, newspapers, optical media

Other information
- Website: www.glendaleca.gov

Glendale Library, Arts & Culture (GLAC) is the name used for a group of eight library branches in Glendale, California, under the Library, Arts & Culture Department. Founded in 1907, the Glendale Library, Arts & Culture Department includes six neighborhood libraries as well as the Brand Library & Art Center, a regional visual arts and music library and performance venue housed in the historic 1904 mansion of Glendale real estate developer Leslie Coombs Brand, and the Central Library, a 93,000 square foot center.

== Collections ==
According to internal calculations, as of June 30, 2005, GLAC owned well over 700,000 volumes of print materials, with a majority (over 400,000) being housed at the Central Library. Not included in those totals are a wealth of currently uncataloged items of local historical importance (photographs and ephemera). GLAC also owns a large body of non-English print materials (specializing in Armenian titles), as well as a "Genocide Memorial Collection" of works pertaining to the Armenian Genocide.

== History ==
Library services in Glendale were first provided in 1906. The women of the Tuesday Afternoon Club, a social and philanthropic organization, raised money through a series of lectures to fund a library collection. The library opened in a renovated pool room at Third and E (Wilson and Everett) Streets with seventy books, soon supplemented by a State Traveling Library of fifty more, and served a population of 1,186.

In 1907, the City Trustees passed Ordinance 53 which established and supported a library which "...shall be forever free to the inhabitants and nonresident taxpayers of the City of Glendale..." The first year the library had 251 books, 165 registered patrons, and a budget of $248.88. In 1913, a Carnegie grant of $12,500 made possible the construction of the main library at Louise and Fifth (Harvard Street). The building was completed and dedicated November 13, 1914. The building was enlarged in 1926. Between 1940 and 1942, two side wings were added, one becoming a children's library called the Hans Christian Andersen Room and the other housing Readers' Service.

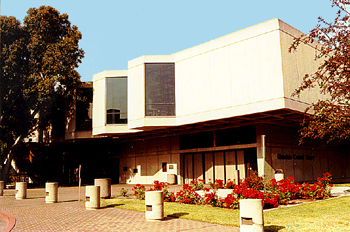
Downtown Central Library, prior to the 2016 renovation

The present Central Library building was designed by Welton Becket shortly before his death, and opened on March 13, 1973 on the former site of Glendale Union High School and Glendale College. With 92,600 square feet (8,600 m^{2}) it had over four times the floor space of the old structure. The library represents one of the rare examples of Brutalist architecture among Southern California's public buildings.

The Central Library's 2016 remodel has brought library users a larger Children's Room and a separate Audio Visual area, as well as the ReflectSpace an inclusive exhibition space. It showcases powerful exhibitions concerning human rights issues with the leadership of Ara Oshagan and Anadid Oshagan curatorial team. The new upper level includes an expansion of the Special Collections room to accommodate the valuable historical information housed there. This effort to modernize the library's facilities while leaving the architectural heritage intact earned the library a Preservation Award in 2018 from the Los Angeles Conservancy.

== Brand Library & Art Center ==
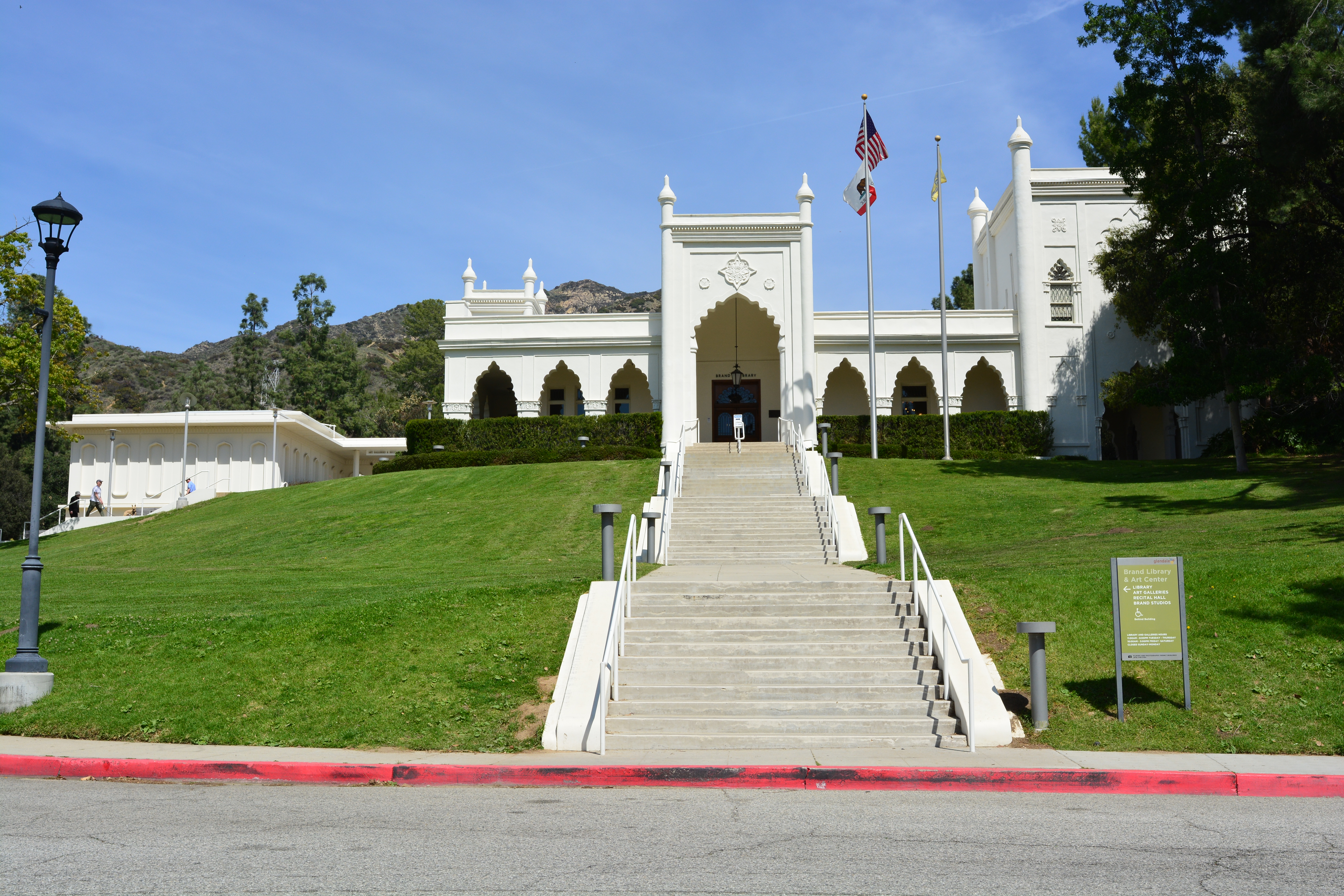
Brand Library and Art Center in 2025

Brand Library & Art Center is the art and music branch of the Glendale Library, Arts & Culture Department. Facilities at Brand Library & Art Center include an art and music library, art galleries and recital hall.

Brand Library is housed in a mansion built in 1904. Located in Brand Park high in the foothills overlooking Glendale and the San Fernando Valley, the mansion was built by Leslie C. Brand

== ReflectSpace ==
ReflectSpace is an educational exhibition space that has explored the Armenian Genocide, presenting personal as well as reflective narratives, along with topics such as Asian Comfort women, slavery, the Holocaust, Native American genocide in the United States, LGBTQ issues, Internment of Japanese Americans, immigration, and the Incarceration in the United States. With a focus on Glendale and an international perspective, it delves into contemporary issues like displacement, borders, and societal violence, as well as other significant human rights issues.

ReflectSpace is a member of the International Coalition of Sites of Conscience, a global network of historic sites, museums, and memory initiatives that connect past struggles to today’s movements for human rights.

== Computer Services ==
Glendale Public Library offers many services to its patrons, both at the Central location as well as its branches. GPL Central provides free wireless broadband internet access throughout the system. GPL currently provides wired internet access through their 32 public computers at Central and many at each branch location. GPL offers classes on various software such as Microsoft Word, Excel, and PowerPoint, in addition to their extremely popular "Computer Club for Beginners". The "Computer Club" class helps students of all ages learn the basics of operating a computer, searching the Internet, and using email. GPL also offers computer classes in Spanish and Armenian.

== Adult Reading Program ==
The Glendale Public Library Adult Reading Program offers an approach to learning literacy skills. The program combines basic instruction with the adult students' goals, making it possible for adults who struggle with reading to learn and use the tools necessary for life, family, job and pride. Both those new to reading and those new to the English language can benefit from the Adult Reading Program.

== Be The Change Series ==
Glendale Library, Arts & Culture's Be the Change Series is a program "to build collective understanding of systemic racism, elevate the voices and stories of Black, Indigenous and People of Color (BIPOC)".

=== Black History Month ===
Every February, the Library pays tribute to the local Black community with a celebration of Black History Month.

=== Armenian History Month ===
Every April, the Library pays tribute to the local Armenian community with a celebration of history and culture.

In 2023, Glendale Central Library will host an Armenian History Month celebration, including organizations such as Armenian Relief Society, Armenian Youth Federation, GALAS LGBTQ+ Armenian Society and Homenetmen.

=== Asian American and Pacific Islander Heritage Month ===
Every May, the Library pays tribute to the local Asian and Pacific Islander community with a celebration of Asian American and Pacific Islander Heritage Month.

=== Pride Month ===
Every June, the Library pays tribute to the local LGBTQIA+ community with a celebration of Pride Month.

=== National Hispanic Heritage Month ===
Every September, the Library pays tribute to the local Hispanic and Latino American community with a celebration of National Hispanic Heritage Month.
