= Los Angeles Department of Water and Power =

Largest American municipal utility

Agency overview
- Formed: 1902 (water); 1916 (electric)
- Preceding agency: Los Angeles City Water Company
- Type: Water infrastructure and electricity
- Headquarters: John Ferraro Building 111 North Hope Street Los Angeles, California; 34.0580°N 118.2495°W
- Employees: 11,000 employees
- Annual budget: US$6.1 billion (fy2017/2018)
- Agency executive: Janisse Quiñones, CEO and Chief Engineer
- Website: www.ladwp.com

The Los Angeles Department of Water and Power (LADWP) is the largest municipal utility in the United States with 8,100 megawatts of electric generating capacity (2021–2022) and delivering an average of 435 million gallons of water per day (487,000 acre-ft per year) to more than four million residents and local businesses in the City of Los Angeles and several adjacent cities and communities in southwestern Los Angeles County, California.

It was founded in 1902 to supply water to residents and businesses in the city of Los Angeles and several of its immediately adjacent communities. In 1917, LADWP began to deliver electricity to portions of the city. It has been involved in a number of controversies, including the 1928 St. Francis Dam failure, and written about in critical media portrayals such as those in the books Water and Power and Cadillac Desert.

== History ==
The Los Angeles Department of Water and Power had six names changes since it was established in 1902.

=== Private operators ===
By the middle of the 19th century, Los Angeles's rapid population growth magnified problems with the city's water distribution system. At that time, a system of open, often polluted ditches, was supplying water for agricultural production but was not suited to provide water to homes. In 1853, the city council rejected as "excessive" a closed-pipe system that would serve homes directly. As a solution, the city allowed "water carriers with jugs and horse-drawn wagons…to serve the city's domestic [water] needs." By 1857 the council decided that the system needed to be updated, granting William G. Dryden franchise rights to provide homes with water through a system of underground water mains. The initial system served only a few homes using a network of wooden pipes. In December 1861, heavy rains destroyed the system and Dryden gave up his franchise. The city attempted contracting out water distribution rights to others, but none of the systems resulting from these contracts were successful.

The city's previous attempts to allow others to develop a water system on its behalf prompted the city council to relinquish its rights to the water in the Los Angeles River in 1868. The city of Los Angeles could no longer benefit from their municipal water distribution business. John S. Griffen, Solomon Lazard, and Prudent Beaudry, created the Los Angeles City Water Company, which violated many of the provisions of its lease on the Los Angeles River, including secretly tunneling under the river to extract 150 times as much water as the lease allowed. As the end of the lease drew near in the mid-1890s, popular support began to build for a return to complete municipal control of the local water supply.

=== Public control ===
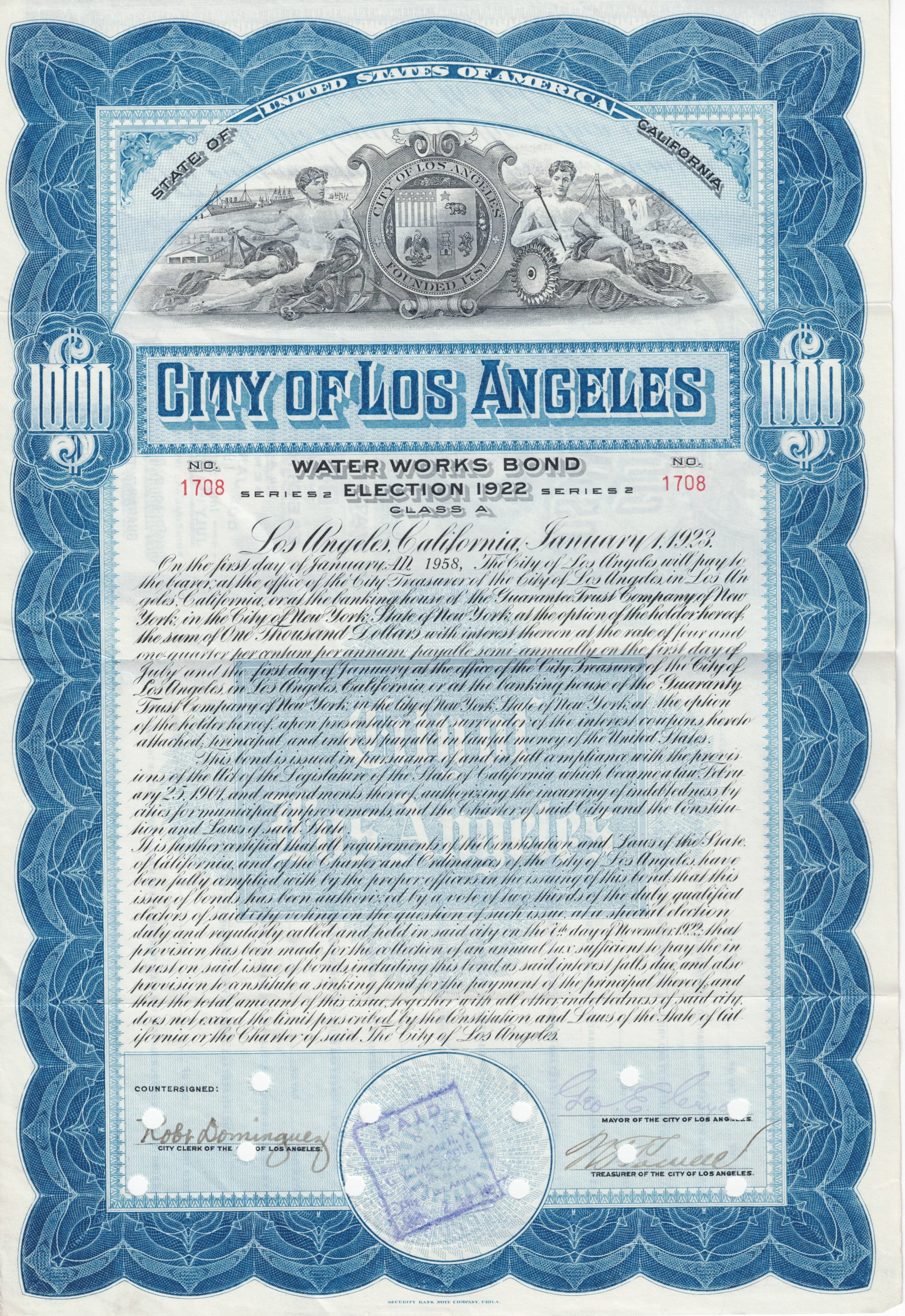
Water Works Bond of the City of Los Angeles, issued 1. January 1923

Fred Eaton proposed that tax revenues would enable Los Angeles to provide water to its residents without charging them for the use of water directly. During Eaton's nine-year term as the superintending engineer of the Los Angeles City Water Company, he headed a large expansion of the company's water system. Eaton left his position in 1886 when he was elected City Engineer. In early 1897, city engineers created plans for an updated water system and the Los Angeles City Water Company's lease was not renewed beyond its expiration date, July 21, 1898. In early 1898, talks between the city and the Los Angeles City Water Company began to take over the company's current water system.

During negotiations it was decided that the current senior employees of the Los Angeles City Water Company would keep their jobs in order to ensure that the water system could continue to operate. It was not guaranteed that William Mulholland, who took over as superintending engineer after Eaton, would have a position working with the city-owned water system. Mulholland did not produce records the city officials requested during negotiations. It was discovered that neither the requested records nor a map of the water system existed. Mulholland, who was in charge of the non-existent records, claimed that he memorized all necessary information, including the size of every inch of pipe and the age and location of every valve. Mulholland secured a job with the city when he demonstrated his ability to recall the information. He then intervened with the company's principal stockholder, advising him to accept the city's offer of two million dollars for the system.

The LADWP has been a leading actor in the struggle over access to water from the Owens Valley, starting with its initial acquisition of water rights, as well as acquiring farms and governance of Mono Lake and Owens Lake.

=== Power delivery ===
The Los Angeles Bureau of Power and Light was formed in 1911 to administer the electrical system in the city that supplied power generated by private companies. In 1922, it purchased Southern California Edison's distribution system within the city limits. In 1937, when the Bureau purchased the power system of the Los Angeles Gas and Electric Corporation, it became the dominant power supplier in the city. That year, the bureau merged with the Bureau of Water Works and Supply to become the Los Angeles Department of Water and Power (LADWP). In 1939, LADWP became the sole electrical service provider for the city of Los Angeles.

The Bureau first offered municipal electricity in 1917 when their Power Plant No. 1, a hydroelectric power plant located in San Francisquito Canyon powered by the Los Angeles Aqueduct, began generating electricity. It ultimately produced 70.5 megawatts and is still in operation, producing enough electricity for 37,500 Los Angeles homes.

Three years later, in 1920, Power Plant No. 2 was added, but destroyed when the St. Francis Dam failed. However, the plant was completely rebuilt and back in service by November 1928. It remains in operation today, having the capacity to generate 18 megawatts.

On March 12, 1928, the St. Francis Dam, built and operated by the LADWP, collapsed catastrophically. The disaster was the second-greatest loss of life in California's history, after the 1906 San Francisco earthquake and fire. The ensuing flood caused devastation to present-day Valencia, Newhall and the cities in the Santa Clara River Valley, taking the lives of some 425 people. The high death toll was due, in part, to confusion and mis-communication by and between employees of both the LADWP and Southern California Edison, who also had facilities and operations in the area. The confusion led to a lack of prompt warnings being sent to the downriver communities. Those cities included Piru, Fillmore, Santa Paula, and San Buenaventura. Mulholland assumed full responsibility for the disaster and retired the following year.

The LADWP played a role in the development of Hoover Dam and bringing its energy to Los Angeles. The LADWP continued to operate the Hoover Dam electrical facility alongside Southern California Edison until 1987.

=== Modern history ===
On January 17, 1994, the city of Los Angeles experienced its one and only total system black-out as a result of the Northridge earthquake. Much of the power was restored within a few hours.

In September 2005, a DWP worker accidentally cut power lines that caused over half of Los Angeles to be without power for one and one-half hours.

On October 10, 2011, the LADWP, along with the Community Redevelopment Agency of Los Angeles and the Los Angeles Cleantech Alliance, founded the LA Cleantech Incubator.

In October 2022, LADWP lost a lawsuit against the Great Basin Unified Air Pollution Control District for failure to control dust on Owens Lake near sensitive sacred tribal land claiming that they were not responsible for the pollution.

=== Criticism over excessive overtime and payroll cost ===
The LADWP has been criticized for allowing excessive overtime. In 2018, 306 of its workers took home more than $100,000 in overtime pay, while the agency paid $250 million for overtime, a new high for the agency. The most egregious example of this is a security worker who was paid $314,000 in overtime, on a listed base pay of $25,000, along with three peers who were paid more than $200,000 overtime each. (The nationwide median wage for security officers was $28,500 in 2018.) One policy which enables these large overtime payouts is a provision in the union contracts which requires a normal shift worked after more than one hour of overtime to be paid at double time, with that overtime not based on working time more than 40 hours in a week but on working time beyond a "normal" shift.

A separate study found that LADWP's yearly payroll expense per customer was $490, significantly higher than the nationwide median for large utilities of $280 per customer.

== Power system ==
In 2019–20, LADWP supplied more than 21,130 gigawatt hours (GWH) to more than 1.5 million residential and business customers, as well as about 5,200 in the Owens Valley.

The LADWP operates four natural gas-fired generating stations within city boundaries, which combined with other natural gas sources, account for 24% of capacity. While formerly receiving electricity from coal-fired plants in Utah and Arizona, it transitioned away from coal in 2025. A further 14% is generated using nuclear power, which is from the Palo Verde Nuclear Generating Station in Arizona. It receives about 2% of its electricity from hydropower, most coming from Hoover Dam and the rest coming from the Los Angeles Aqueduct system itself as the water descends from its mountain sources.

The LADWP, along with raw water deliveries and lake level management from the California Department of Water Resources, also operates the Castaic Power Plant as a pumped storage facility. Water flows from the upper reservoir to the lower during the day, generating power when demand is highest, and is pumped back up at night when excess capacity is available. About 1,600 megawatts, or 22% of the total capacity, is generated at this facility.

LADWP maintains a diverse and vertically integrated power generation, transmission and distribution system that spans five Western states, and delivers electricity to more than 4 million people in Los Angeles.

=== Electricity mix ===
The Los Angeles City Council voted in 2004 to direct the LADWP to generate 20% of its energy (excluding Hoover Dam) from clean sources by 2010, a goal which was met and exceeded. The LADWP expected to achieve 25 percent renewables by 2016 and 33 percent by 2020, both which have been met and exceeded. As of 2020, "green power" renewable energy sources accounted for 37% of the LADWP's capacity, including the 120 MW Pine Tree Wind Farm, the largest municipally owned wind farm in the United States. LADWP is also investing in photovoltaic solar throughout the Southwest and geothermal sources in the Salton Sea area.

In March 2021, LADWP joined with Mayor Eric Garcetti, United States Secretary of Energy Jennifer Granholm, leading energy scientists, and local elected officials to announce the results of the Los Angeles 100% Renewable Energy Study ("LA100"). The study, which was conducted by renewable energy experts at the U.S. Department of Energy's National Renewable Energy Laboratory, laid out a pathway for LADWP to achieve a 100% renewable energy grid as early as 2035 and by 2045 at the latest. The pathway includes significant deployment of renewable and zero-carbon energy by 2035, including wind and solar resources accounting for 69% to 87% of generated power.

As of 2020, the largest component of the power supply was renewable energy at about 37%. The second-largest component was natural gas, at about 24%. Coal-fired power made up a further 21%. By contrast, the California investor-owned utilities SCE, PG&E, and SDG&E, had all eliminated their use of coal. In 2013, LADWP announced it would become coal-free by 2025 by divesting its 21% stake in Navajo Generating Station in 2016 and converting the Intermountain Power Plant to run on natural gas.

==== Undergrounding ====
Most of the power lines in Los Angeles were built above-ground before it became customary to run power lines below-ground. Starting in 2007, LADWP has a long-term project to upgrade the overhead power lines and convert them to underground. This difficult conversion has been slowed by budget constraints, the impact on traffic, the pursuit of other modernization projects, and the lingering effects of a workforce reduction over the last decade. Budget issues are particularly acute in the department's transmission system, where underground transmission costs about 10 to 14 times the cost of overhead transmission, per unit length, and the technical and environmental challenges which confront such installations. Additionally, undergrounding of the three 500 kV transmission lines (five lines, if the Pacific AC Intertie's two 500 kV lines terminating in Los Angeles are included) is presently technically infeasible.

== Water system ==
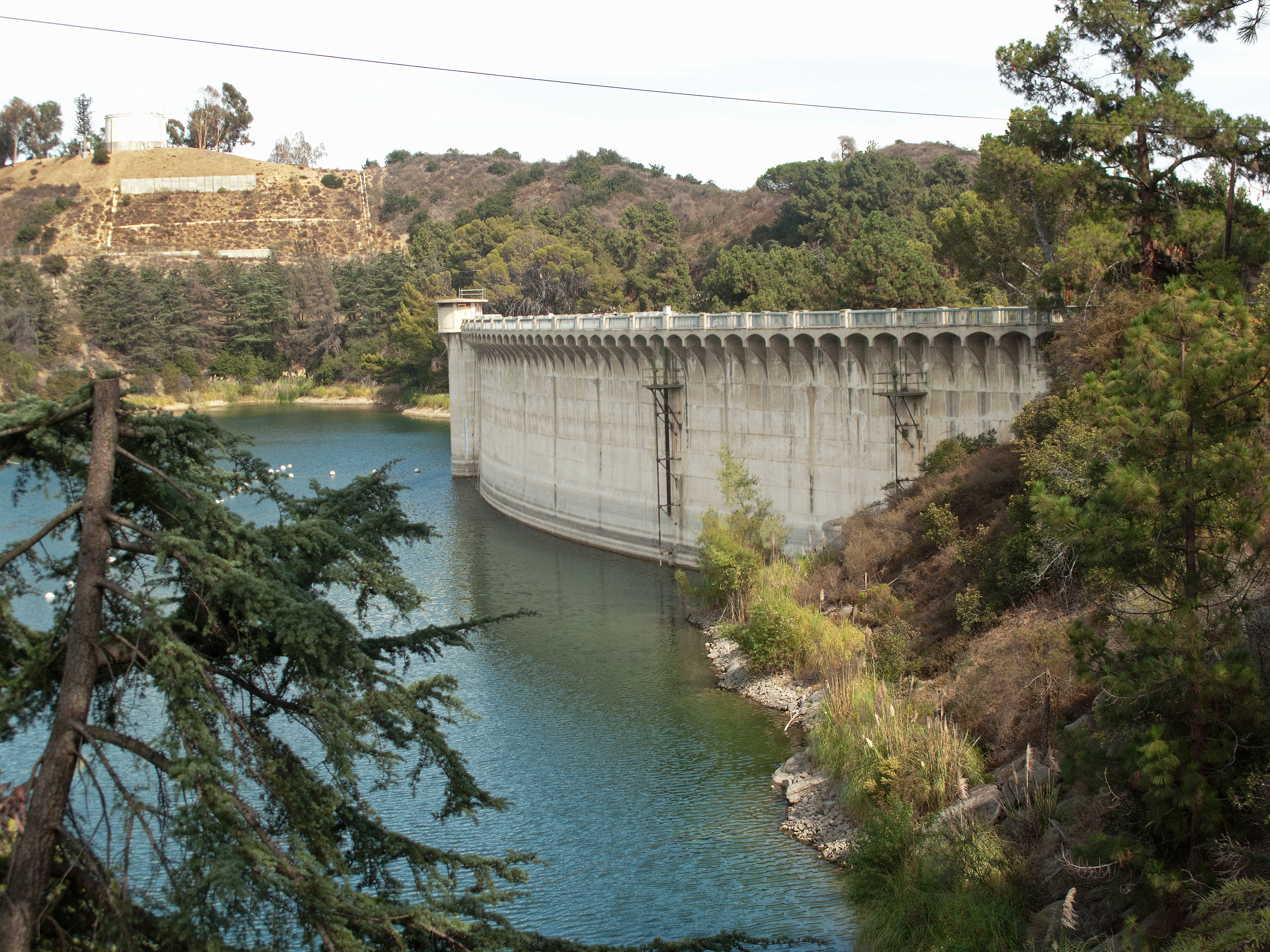
Mulholland Dam and Hollywood Reservoir

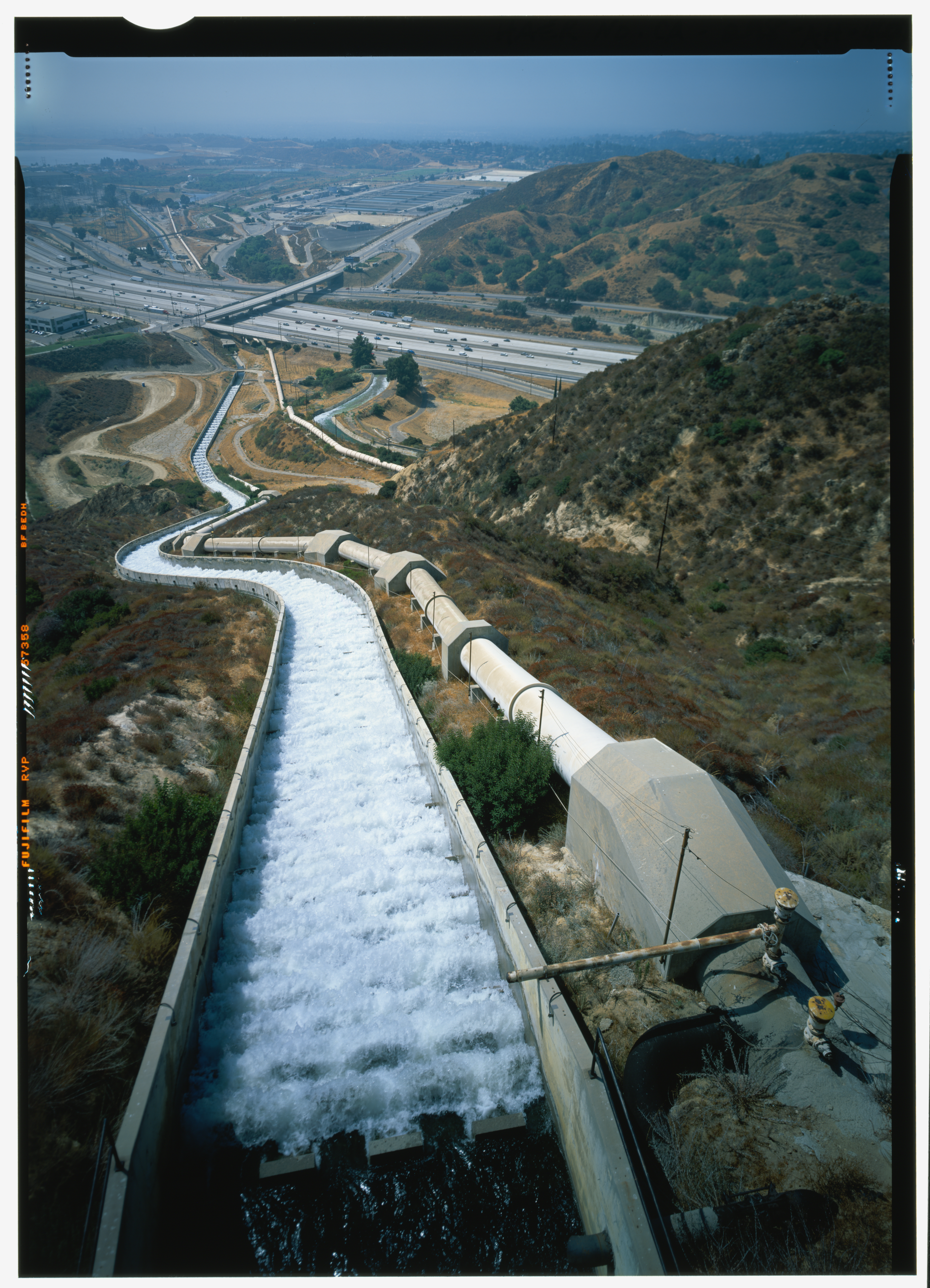
Cascades near Newhall Pass, Los Angeles Aqueduct

The LADWP provided about 159 billion gallons (602 million cubic meters) of water in 2019, to 735,600 water service connections, pumping it through 7,340 miles (11,813 km) of pipe. In fiscal years 2016–2020:

- 48% of the water came from the Sierra Nevada via the Los Angeles Aqueduct, which is transported by gravity, and consequently utilizes no electric power;
- 41% came from the Metropolitan Water District of Southern California, which transports water from the California Aqueduct and Colorado River Aqueduct, which utilizes significant electric power, much of which originates at Hoover Dam, which LADWP operated for nearly 50 years;
- 9% was from local groundwater, a resource that is actively managed and allocated, but is continually being threatened by chemical pollutants, such as MTBE and perchlorates;
- 2% came from recycled water and was used for irrigation, recreation, and industrial purposes.

The use of water from specific sources can vary greatly from year to year.

The prospect of increased demand coupled with reduced supply from the Mono and Owens basins is causing the LADWP to look into a number of new water sources, including a new direct connection to the California Aqueduct, increased use of recycled water, use of stormwater capture and reuse, and increased conservation. Many of the old pipelines are beginning to wear out, or are at capacity and insufficient to handle future demand. LADWP has undertaken pipeline replacement projects on many L.A. boulevards like Exposition and Olympic.

== Service territory ==
LADWP building in Westchester, Los Angeles (2026)

In addition to Los Angeles, LADWP provides services to parts of:

- Bishop, California
- Culver City, California
- South Pasadena, California
- West Hollywood, California
- Westside, Los Angeles

Over its service territory, LADWP serves four million residents and businesses.

== Governance ==
=== Board of Water and Power Commissioners ===
LADWP is overseen by the Los Angeles Board of Water and Power Commissioners, which has five-members, who are appointed by the Mayor of Los Angeles and confirmed by the Los Angeles City Council for five-year terms. The board sets policy for the Department of Water and Power and votes on utility rates, renewable energy projects, and pension tiers for LADWP employees.

The Board meets regularly on the second and fourth Tuesday of each month at 10:00 a.m. During the Covid epidemic, the Board observed physical distancing measures in accordance with California Governor Gavin Newsom's order for COVID-19 prevention.

Regular meeting agendas are available to the public at least 72 hours before the Board meets. The agenda for meetings contains a brief general description of the items to be considered. The Board may consider an item not on the agenda only in limited circumstances consistent with the Brown Act.

On May 26, 2023, Commissioner Cynthia Ruiz was informed by the deputy mayor that she was being removed as a commissioner less than one year into her term, which was confirmed that day by an email from Mayor Karen Bass, whose decision it was. Ruiz was the first Native American to serve on the Los Angeles Board of Water and Power Commissioners. George McGraw was sworn in to replace Ruiz June 20, 2023.

=== Executive management ===
The general manager, senior assistant general managers, chief financial officer, and managing senior assistant city attorney (under the Los Angeles City Attorney) manage operations.

On January 31, 2014, Ron Nichols resigned as chief of the LADWP.

On February 21, 2014, Marcie L. Edwards was unanimously confirmed by the Los Angeles City Council on February 21, 2014. She was the first woman to lead the LADWP. At the time of her nomination, Edwards was Anaheim's City Manager. Prior to her appointment as Anaheim's City Manager, Edwards served as chief of Anaheim Public Utilities for 13 years. Edwards previously worked at the LADWP for 24 years, starting at the age of 19 as a clerk typist.

In August 2016, Marcie L. Edwards announced her retirement. On August 16, 2016, the Los Angeles Board of Water and Power Commissioners appointed David H. Wright Interim General Manager, and requested the City Council to confirm his appointment as permanent General Manager. Wright remained General Manager until 2019, when he resigned following a raid by the Federal Bureau of Investigation of LADWP Headquarters. Wright was then investigated and sentenced to 72 months in federal prison for accepting bribes from a lawyer to ensure the approval of a three-year $30 million no-bid contract.

LADWP veteran Martin L. Adams was confirmed by City Council as General Manager on September 13, 2019.

In 2024, the incoming head of the municipal agency Janisse Quiñones had an annual salary of $750,000. After Karen Bass nominated her, the City Council unanimously approved her for the highest-paying post in Los Angeles government. In 2026, Quiñones left to head Luma, which is modernizing Puerto Rico’s electric grid as a private company that operates and manages the transmission and distribution system.

== Headquarters ==
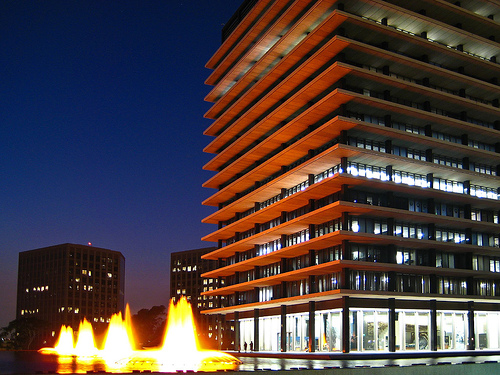
The John Ferraro Building

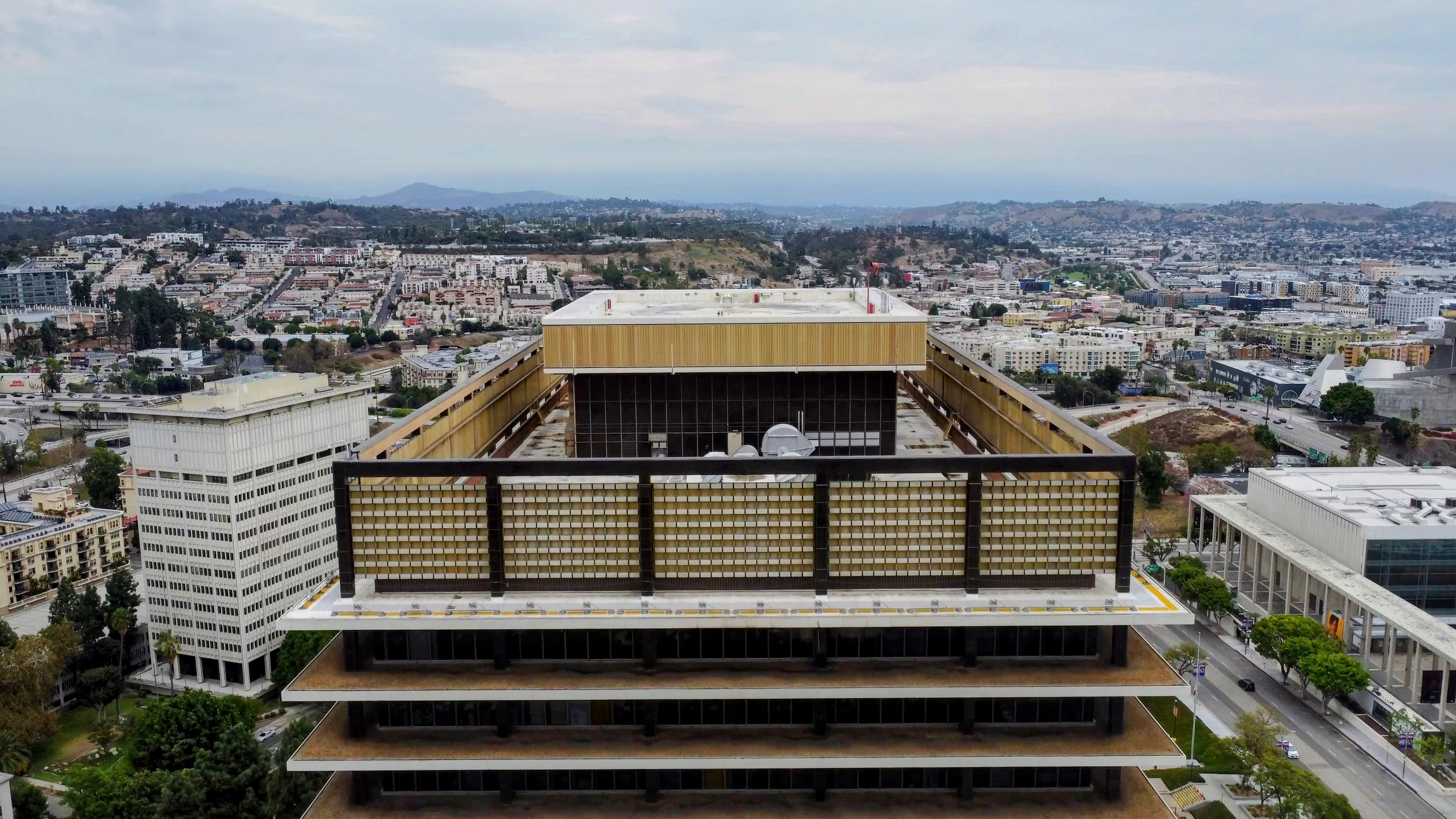
The John Ferraro Building helipad

LADWP is headquartered in a Corporate-International Style building designed by A.C. Martin & Associates and completed in May 1965. The 17-story building was constructed on Bunker Hill with the purpose of consolidating 11 building offices scattered across Downtown Los Angeles and housing LADWP's 3,200 employees. On September 21, 2012, it was designated as a Los Angeles Historic-Cultural Monument.

The General Office Building of the Los Angeles Department of Water & Power was renamed the John Ferraro Building on November 16, 2000, after the late Los Angeles City Councilman John Ferraro. The building was featured extensively in the 2010 science fiction thriller film Inception.

== In popular culture ==
Unusually for a municipal public utility, LADWP has been mentioned several times in popular culture, both fiction and nonfiction:

- The 1974 Roman Polanski film Chinatown, a fictionalized story based on the California Water Wars, was inspired by LADWP's efforts to acquire land and water rights.
- In 1982 the University of California Press published William L. Kahrl's book Water and Power: The Conflict over Los Angeles' Water Supply in the Owen (ISBN 0-520-04431-2). The book examined the development of water policy in the American West, particularly concentrating on the role of William Mulholland and the LADWP.
- The 1986 book Cadillac Desert: The American West and its Disappearing Water by Marc Reisner (ISBN 0-14-017824-4) is about land development and water policy in the western United States. The subsequent television documentary of the same name devotes an entire episode to Mulholland's Dream to provide plentiful water for Los Angeles.
- The 1997 film Volcano, about a volcano under Los Angeles, mentions the LADWP.
- The 2022 TV series The Lincoln Lawyer, based on the bestselling novels by Michael Connelly, is about an iconoclastic idealist criminal defense attorney in Los Angeles who runs his practice out of the back seat of his Lincoln. This TV series includes many scenes at the John Ferraro Building, headquarters for LADWP.

== See also ==
- Glendale Water and Power Department
- Intermountain Power Agency
- Metropolitan Water District of Southern California
- Hyperion sewage treatment plant
- Cristobal Aguilar, Los Angeles mayor who in 1868 vetoed an ordinance that would have sold Los Angeles's water rights
