= Brand Park (Glendale, California) =

Park in Glendale, California, United States

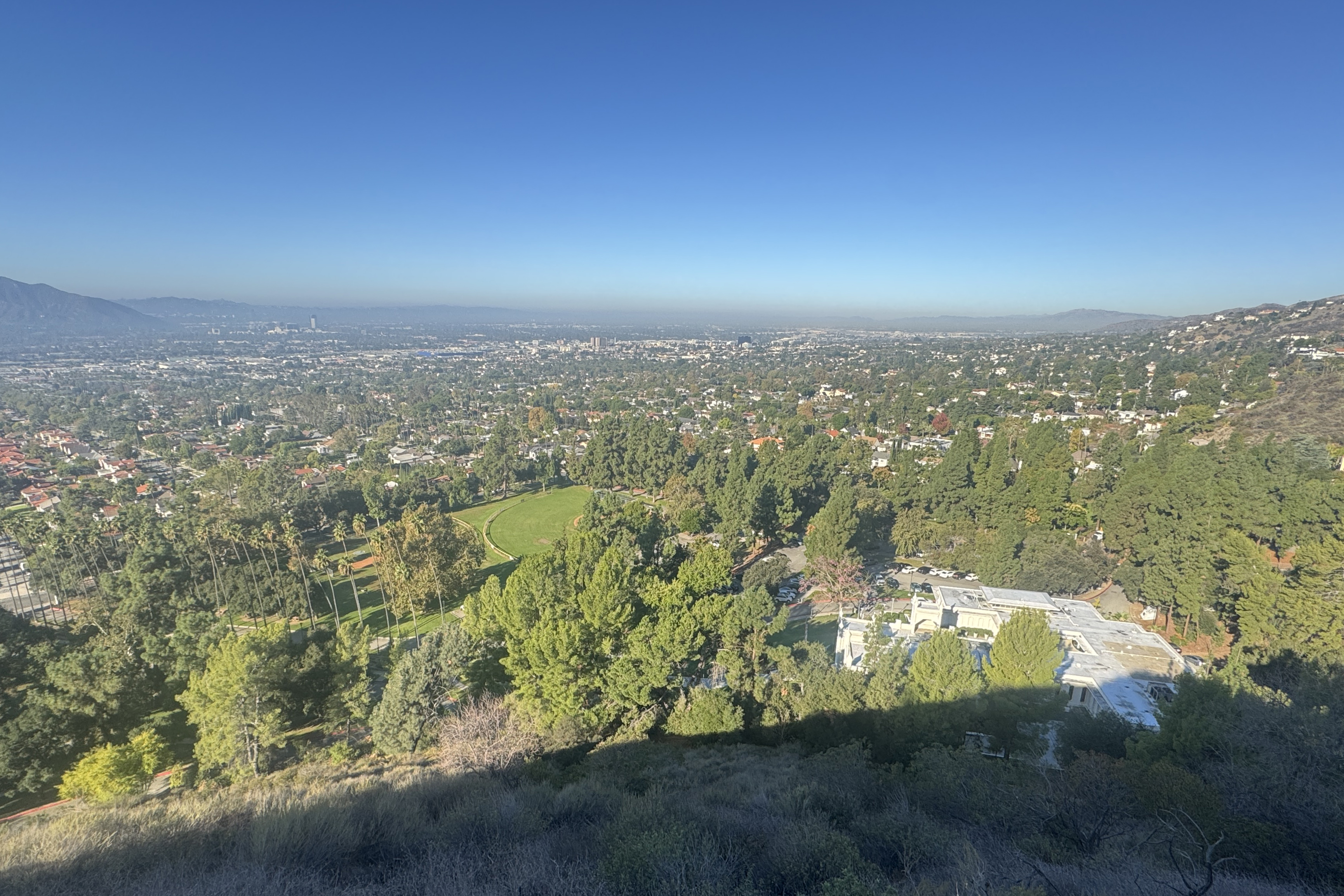
- Brand Park viewed looking SW from the Verdugo Mountains above it, Brand Library & Art Center is visible middle right
- Interactive map of Brand Park
- Location: Glendale, California, United States
- Coordinates: 34.18034°N 118.27696°W
- Area: 31 acres (0.13 km^{2})
- Created: 1925

Brand Park is a public park in the El Miradero district of Glendale, California. It is located in the foothills of the Verdugo Mountains, on the former estate of Leslie C. Brand and overlooking the San Fernando Valley. It contains Miradero, originally the mansion of the estate which now serves as the Brand Library and Art Center, Shoseian Teahouse and gardens, and the Doctors House Museum.

The park is managed by Glendale Community Services & Parks and is freely open to the public from dawn until dusk.

== History ==
The modern 31-acre (13 ha) park is a part of the larger 666-acre (270 ha) estate of Leslie C. Brand, a prominent local developer who built his mansion on the land, and who is buried with his family in a cemetery in the park. The park was established after his death in 1925.

== Buildings ==
=== Brand Library & Art Center ===
==== Construction ====
Brand Library is housed in the mansion built in 1904 and named Miradero (The Overlook). The design is similar to the East Indian Pavilion built for the 1893 Columbian World Exposition held in Chicago and visited by Mr. Brand.

The architecture is considered Saracenic, with crenellated arches, bulbous domes and minars combining characteristics of Spanish, Moorish, and Indian styles. In contrast to the cool white exterior, the inside was finished with a Victorian decor. It was designed by architect Nathaniel Dryden, brother-in-law of Brand, and it was completed in 1904.

==== Current Use ====
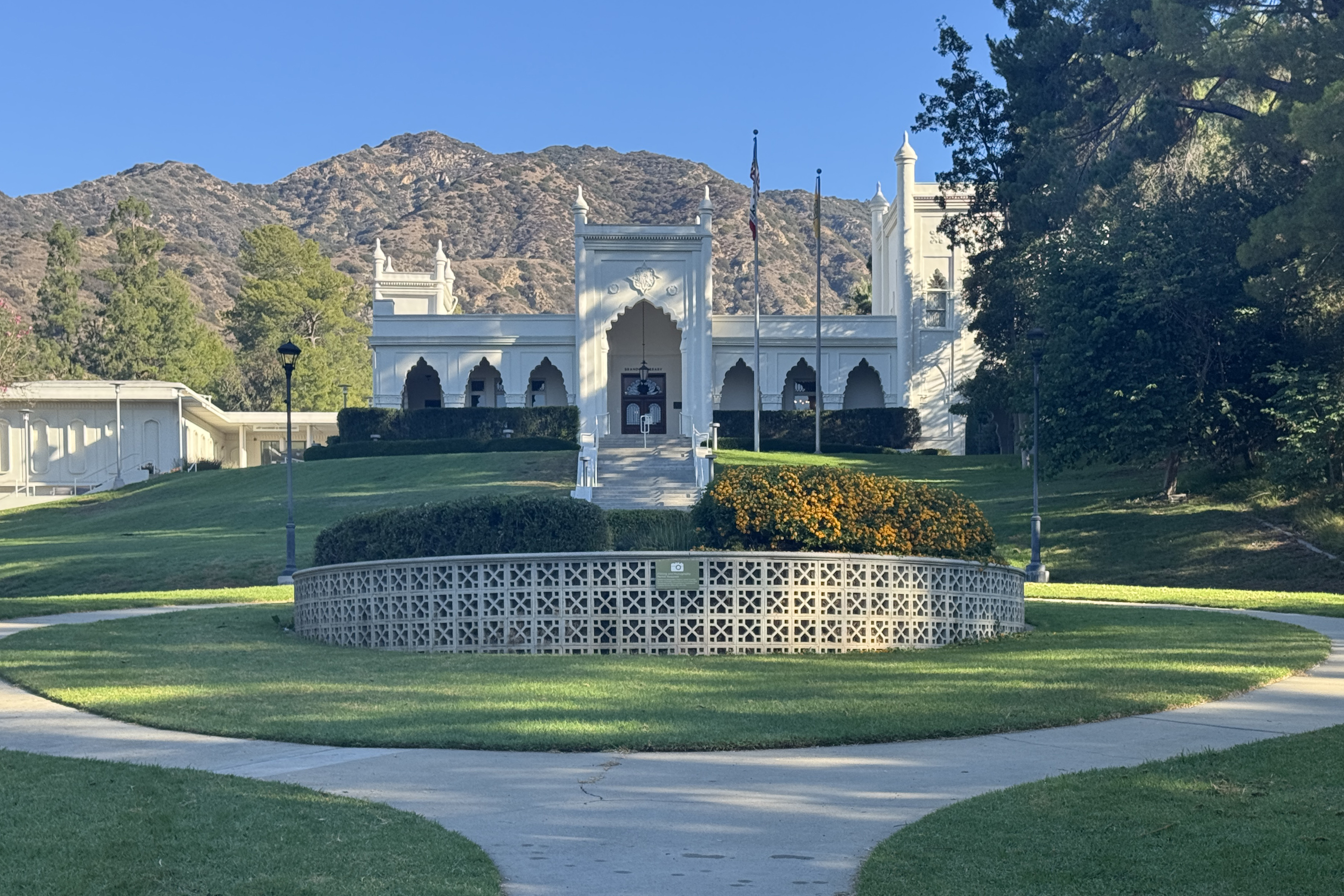
The front of El Miradero, with the Verdugo Mountains in the background

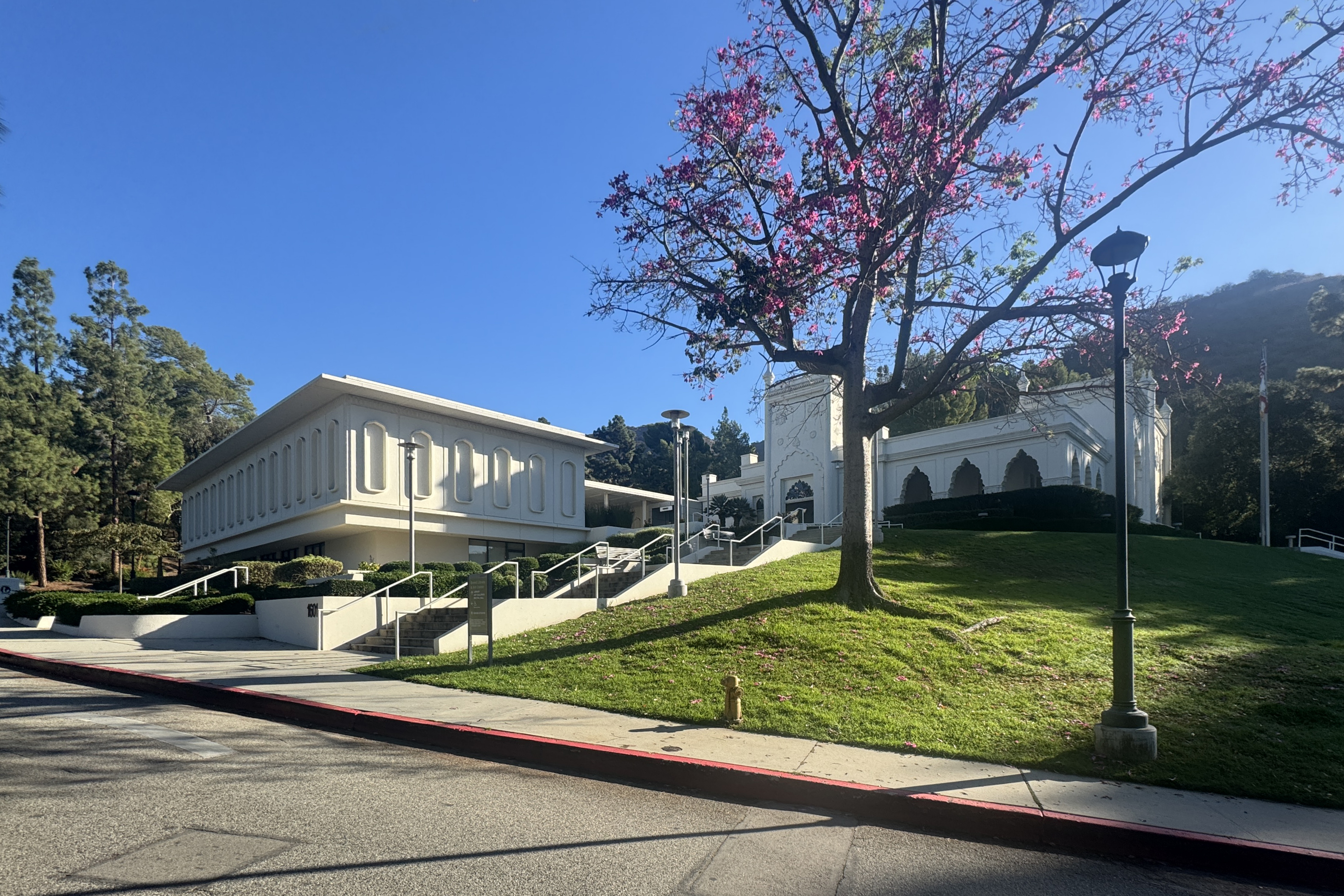
Brand Library & Art Center, El Miradero on the right with the extension to the left

Mr. Brand died in the house in 1925. He bequeathed Miradero to the city, although his wife retained rights of residence until her death. The will provided that the property should be used exclusively for a public park and library. Mrs. Brand died in 1945, and by 1956 the mansion had been converted into Brand Library.

Brand Library & Art Center is the art and music branch of the Glendale Library, Arts & Culture Department. Facilities include an art and music library, art galleries and recital hall. Activities in the center's art studios are programmed by the Community Services and Parks Department. The Library is staffed by subject specialist librarians and has over 110,000 items, including books, scores, DVDs, CDs, LPs, and magazines.

Ten years after opening, in response to the need for larger quarters to serve the growing interest of the community, the city council allocated funds to construct an addition to Brand Library. It would include facilities for art exhibitions, lectures and concerts, as well as an art studio for classes and workshops. The new addition was dedicated in October 1969.

The Associates of Brand Library & Art Center is a 501c3 charitable nonprofit organization founded in 1969 that has awarded art prizes in conjunction with an annual juried art exhibition, has received donations of art, and runs fundraisers to support the facility.

The Brand Library & Art Center was closed for two years for an extensive, $10 million renovation that was completed in 2014.

==== Library Gallery ====
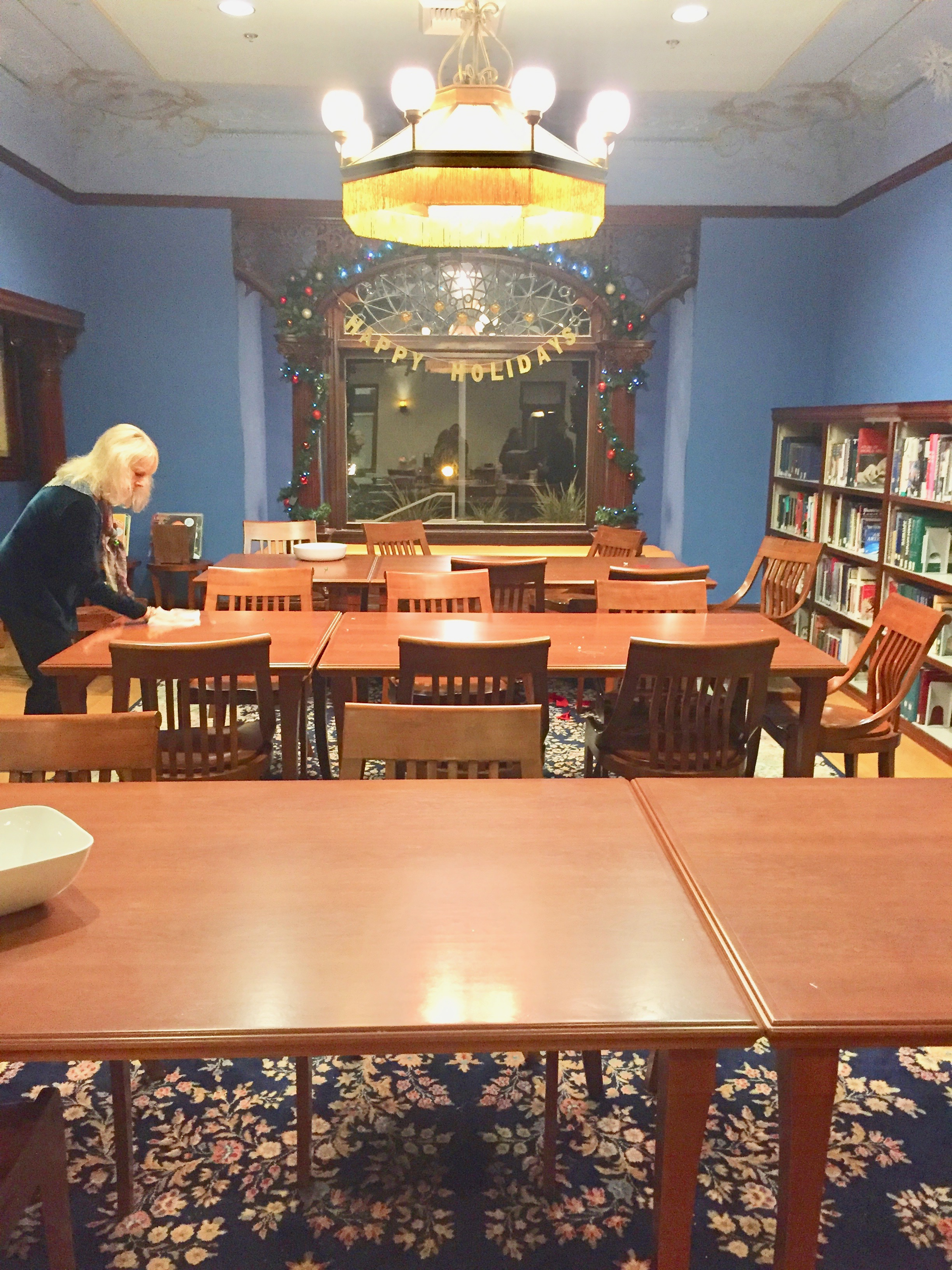
Inside the library

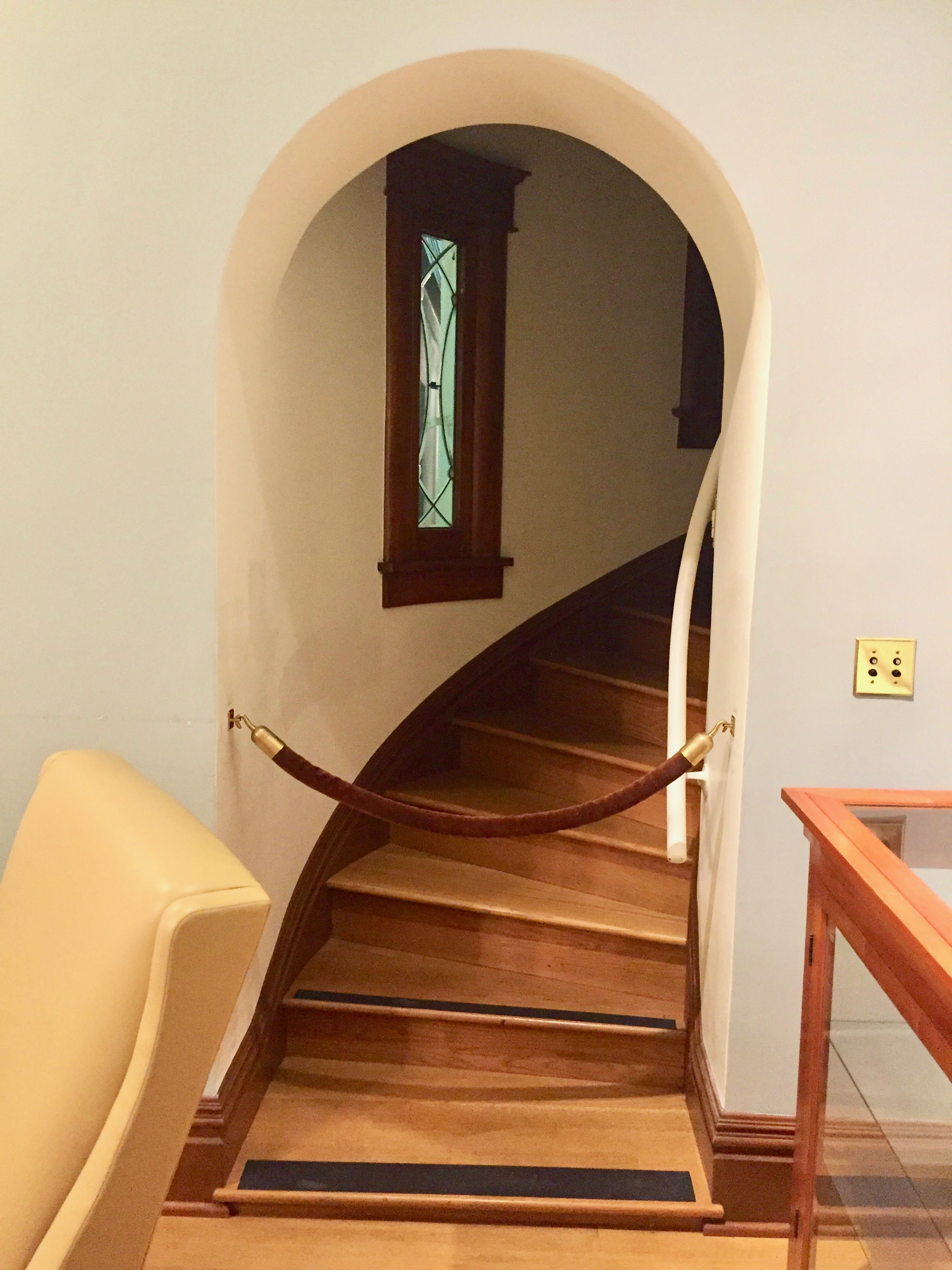
A staircase inside the library

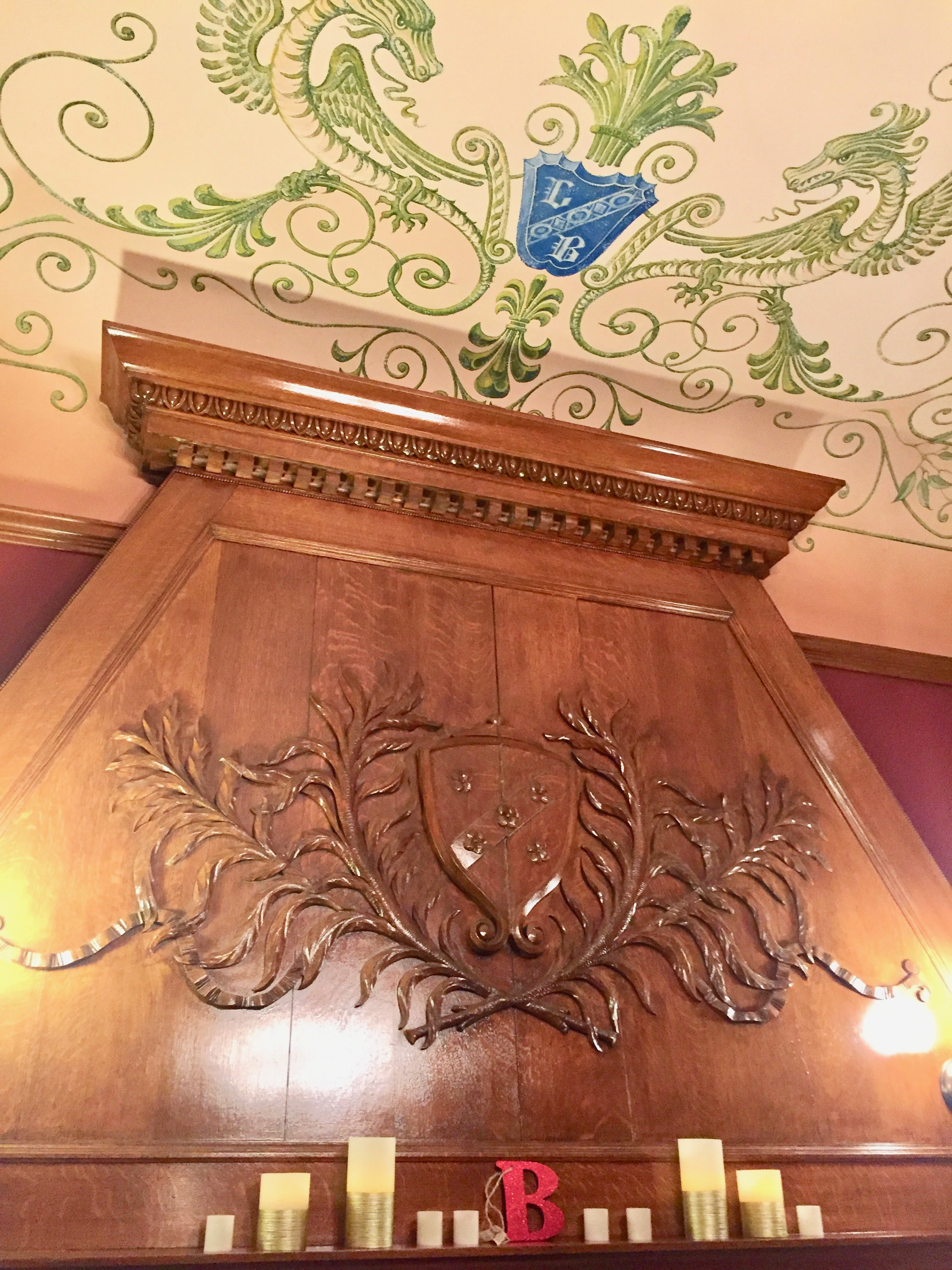
Mantelpiece inside the library

=== Shoseian Tea House and gardens ===
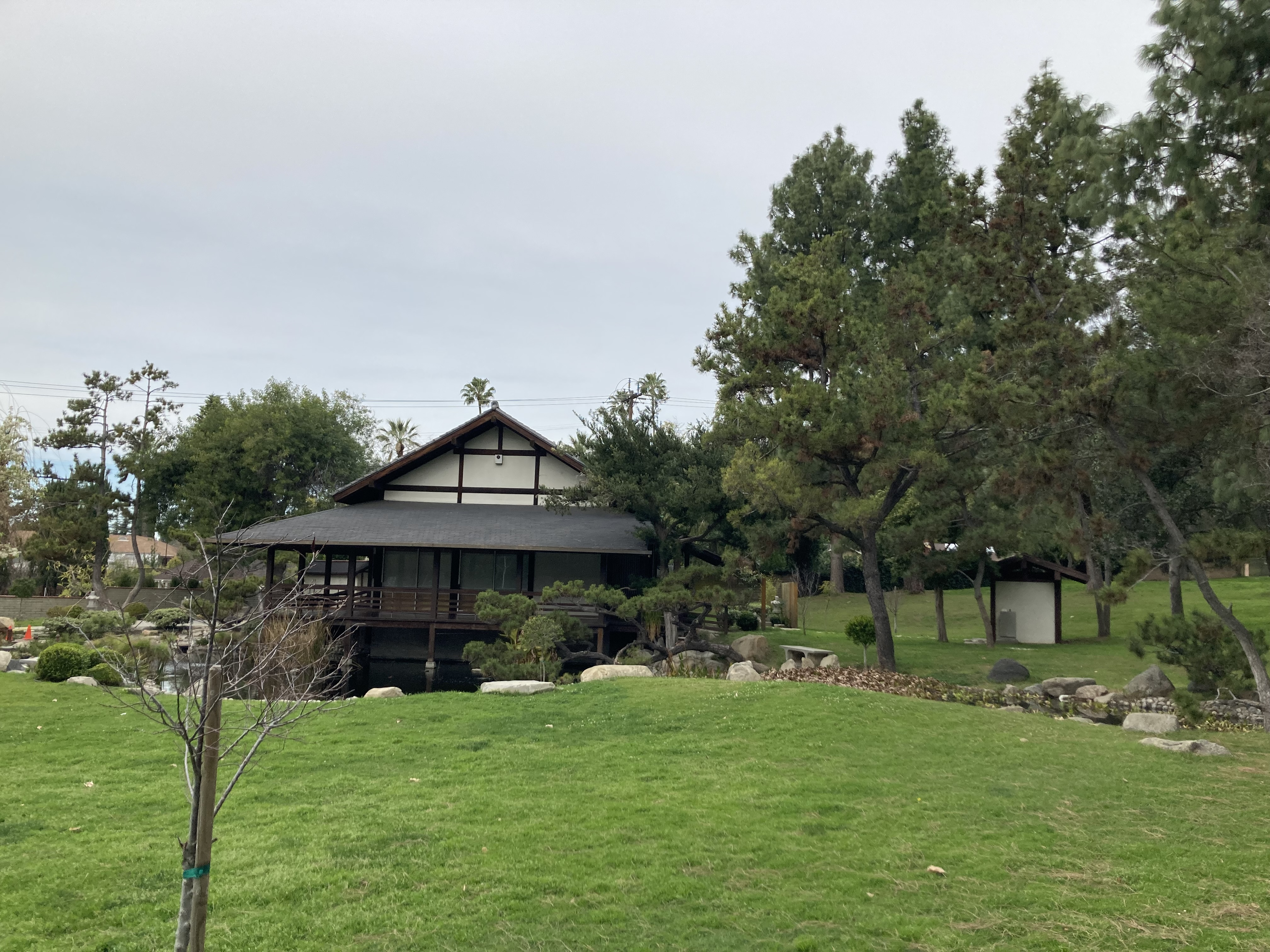
Shoseian Teahouse

Shoseian Teahouse, also known as Whispering Pine Teahouse (the English translation of "Shoseian"), and its gardens are located within Brand Park. It is one of the only traditional Japanese teahouses that is available for public use in the U.S. The building is an important gathering place for the city's Japanese community. The teahouse hosts cultural ceremonies, lectures, and other activities celebrating Japan's history and art.

=== Doctors House Museum ===
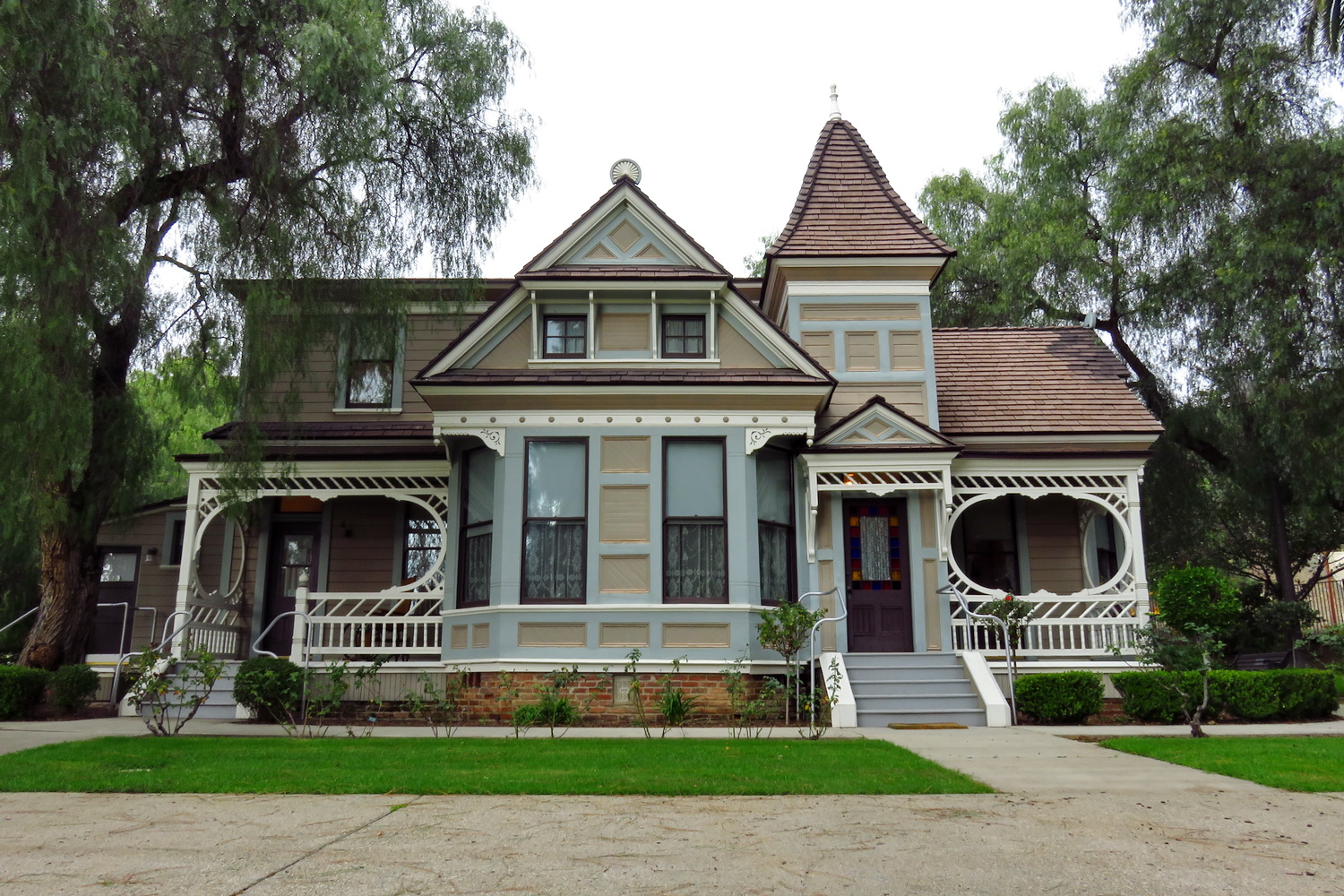
Doctor's House

The museum is housed in a 1888 Victorian house, originally located at 921 E. Wilson Avenue, that was saved from destruction and moved to the park in 1979. It was occupied at different times by two prominent Glendale doctors, Dr. Bogue and Dr. Hurtt The museum is operated by the Glendale Historical Society. It is listed on the Glendale Register of Historic Resources and Historic Districts and is pended for listing on the National Register of Historic Places.

== Recreation ==
- Baseball
- Picnic areas
- Hiking trails

== Wildlife ==
The park is open on the north side to the wilderness of the Verdugo Mountains which are home to numerous deer and coyotes, as well as bobcats, mountain lions and California black bears.

== Brand Landfill Ground Mount Solar Project ==
Announced by Glendale City Council in late 2023, Glendale Water and Power is undertaking a project called Community Solar, to install solar power generation at or on multiple city properties. The 1.8MW Brand Landfill Ground Mount Solar Project, to be located on top of an old landfill up in the north of the park, is currently the largest site in the project. It in the planning phase and public consultation phase as of mid 2026.

== Links ==
- Official website
- Shoseian Teahouse website
