= Shoseian Teahouse =

Teahouse in California

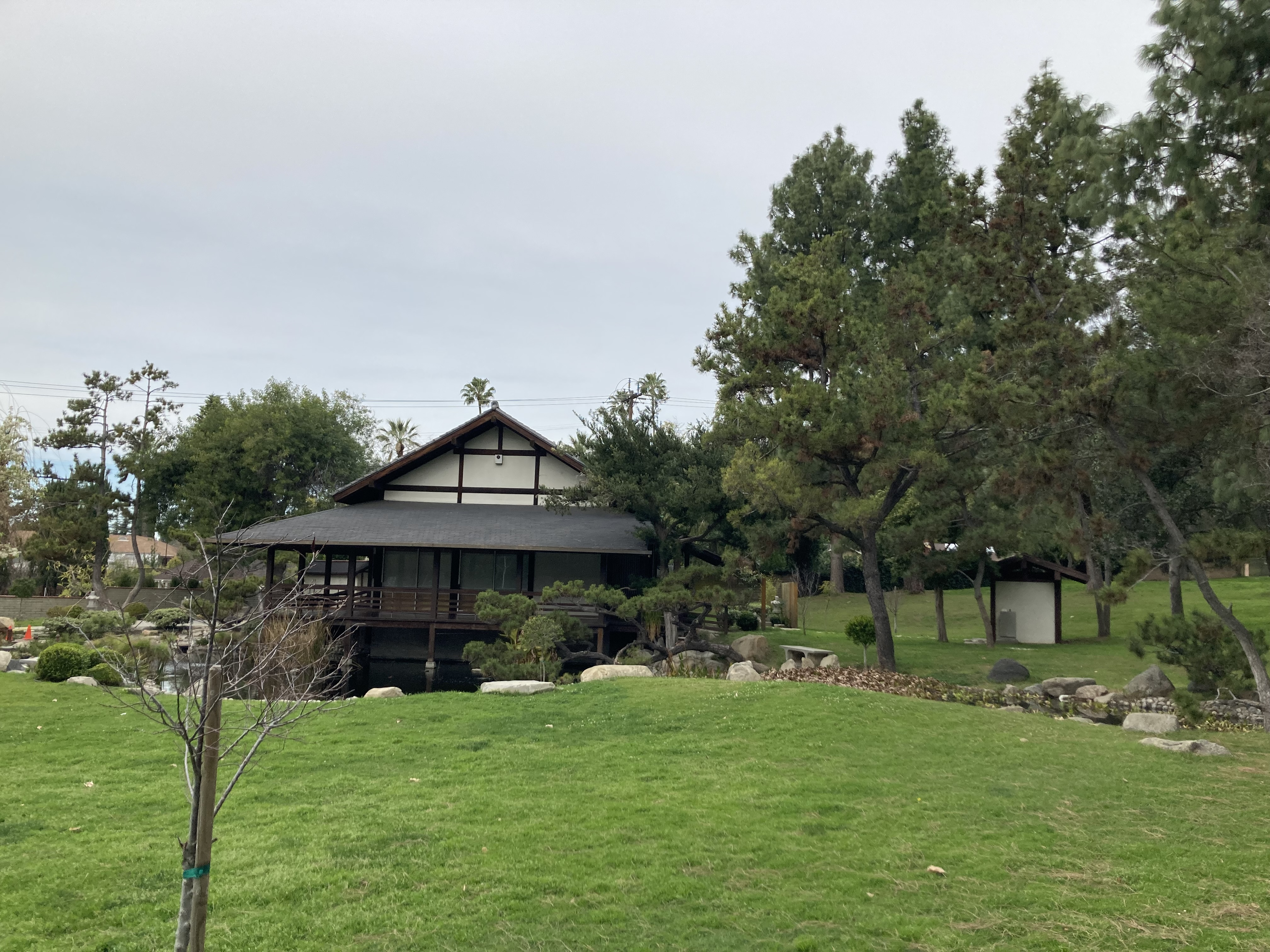
- The teahouse in 2024

- Location within the Los Angeles metropolitan area Shoseian Teahouse (California) Shoseian Teahouse (the United States)

General information
- Architectural style: Japanese-Western
- Location: Brand Park, 1601 W Mountain St, Glendale, CA 91201
- Coordinates: 34.1828°N 118.2780°W
- Year built: 1974
- Owner: Friends of Shoseian

Design and construction
- Architect: Hayahiko Takase

Website
- www.glendaleteahouse.org

The Shoseian Teahouse, also known as the Whispering Pine Teahouse (the English translation of "Shoseian"), is a teahouse in Brand Park in Glendale, California. It is one of the only traditional Japanese teahouses that is available for public use in the U.S. The building is an important gathering place for the city's Japanese community.

== History ==
The building was built in 1974 as a project of Glendale and its sister city in Japan, Higashiōsaka. The teahouse was dedicated on October 20. It was built to show the friendship between the two cities and was led by Otto Neufeld, a local educator. It was named by the 15th Grand Master of the Urasenke School of Tea in Japan, Sen Sōshitsu XV. The school also designated the building as an official tearoom.

The Friends of Shoseian, a volunteer organization, was founded in 2001 and helps with the upkeeping of the building. It is assisted by the City of Glendale and the Los Angeles branch of the Japan Foundation. In 2003, the teahouse was designated a Landmark Building on the Glendale Register of Historic Resources and Historic Districts. The entire interior of the building was renovated from 2018 to 2019.

== Features ==
The teahouse was designed by Hayahiko Takase, blending Western and Eastern characteristics. The building materials were all shipped from Japan. The surrounding grounds contain a koi pond.
