= Los Angeles County Economic Development Corporation =

Los Angeles County Economic Development Corporation (LAEDC) is a public-benefit nonprofit corporation established in 1981 by the Los Angeles County Board of Supervisors. Its mission is “Reinventing our economy to collaboratively advance growth and prosperity for all.” The LAEDC was originally formed to facilitate Los Angeles County's economy with programs to improve and stimulate economic development to ameliorate conditions of poverty, community tensions, and social and economic disparities.

Since then, the organization has grown to encompass a wide range of services, using a broad-based coalition of community, government, business and education partners. LAEDC holds workshops, town halls, conferences, economic forecasts and other professional events throughout the year in various locations throughout the Los Angeles County region, providing partners a path toward collaborative economic development.

== The Institute for Applied Economics ==
This division of the LAEDC conducts notable and widely quoted economic and industry research published for the public. The Institute for Applied Economics [formerly the LAEDC Economic and Policy Consulting Department and the LAEDC Economic and Policy Analysis] and the now-defunct Kyser Center for Economic Research [whose functions were absorbed by the Institute] provides fee-based consulting services to a wide range of clients, detailing economic impact of development, business operations, and regulation, as well as providing intelligence about specific industry clusters, labor force, and workforce development issues. It focuses on the Los Angeles region, California, and national economies.

The Institute’s reports provide decision makers with critical information from which to make informed decisions. In addition to providing on-demand research per client requirements, the Institute also conducts foundational research to ensure LAEDC’s many programs for economic development are on target, including the company’s collaboration with workforce investment boards, its award-winning business assistance program, and its work on the L.A. County Strategic Plan for Economic Development and its cluster development initiatives.

== Industry Cluster Development ==
LAEDC convenes industry leaders to learn about future market trends, technology advances, and hear what industry participants need. LAEDC uses that analysis to advance connections, programs, and policies to increase business growth and hiring here in LA.

LAEDC’s work in five of the many export-oriented LA industries includes council convenings, new market access, VC and procurement match-making, policy development, and talent pipeline development. In addition to helping these industries grow, LAEDC’s industry council convenings also help underserved communities find opportunity in these well-paying industries to improve equity.

Industry Clusters

- Aerospace and Defense
- Bioscience
- Digital Media and Entertainment
- Trade and Logistics
- Ev and Advanced Transportation
- Design
- Ocean Economy
- Fashion and Apparel
- Tourism
- IT
- Food Manufacturing

Industry Councils

- SoCal Aerospace Council
- e4 Mobility Alliance for advanced transportation
- the Bioscience Council
- Blue and Green Goods Movement
- Digital Media & Entertainment (DME) Council.

== Business assistance services ==
LAEDC’s Business Assistance Program team (BAP) offers confidential, free-of-charge consulting to large and small businesses and microenterprises, domestic and international businesses across all industry sectors and business types.

- Strategic consulting
- Access to capital
- Assistance with cost containment
- Assistance with tax credits and incentives for businesses in California
- Marketing strategy consulting
- Assistance with workforce development
- Permit
- Utility rate reduction
- Assistance accessing procurement opportunities
- Business attraction, retention and expansion
- COVID business recovery resources
- Business Resilience Resources

== Foreign Direct Investment and Attraction ==
The World Trade Center Los Angeles (a subsidiary of LAEDC) connects innovative companies in key, emerging industries and helps facilitate foreign direct investment (FDI). The World Trade Center Los Angeles was the first World Trade Center to be designated a public-benefit organization. According to the World Bank “Foreign firms might not create as many jobs as the domestic private sector, but they often create better-paid jobs that require higher skills. That helps elevate the skills level in host economies. The same can be said for other FDI benefits. For instance, more advanced technologies and managerial or marketing practices can be introduced in a developing economy through foreign investment, and at a much faster rate than would be the case if only domestic investment were allowed.” In 2021, foreign-owned enterprises provide 196,820 jobs and $17,953 million in estimated wages in Los Angeles County.

== Workforce Development ==
LAEDC’s workforce development program exists to create economic mobility and equity, support the talent needs of business, and align education with evolving industry trends. The LAEDC workforce development includes the Center for a Competitive Workforce partnership with the region’s 19 community colleges, that integrates LAEDC’s research, industry cluster work, business assistance and intelligence as the locus of strategic, programmatic, public policy, and transactional activities to strengthen the Los Angeles Region’s talent development ecosystem and meet \ changing labor market demands.

== Recent initiatives ==
- The LAEDC is a founding board member of the Southern California Leadership Council.
- The LAEDC is a founding member of Clean Tech Los Angeles, which in October 2011 founded the LA Cleantech Incubator.
- LAEDC was the lead applicant for the U.S. Economic Development Administrations Build Back Better program.
- LAEDC partnered with 19 regional community colleges to fund the Center for Competitive Workforce.
- LAEDC -along with UNITE-LA – are the convener of LA DEAL the California Public Utilities Commission’s sole Broadband Regional Consortia for the Los Angeles region.
- LAEDC is the convener and facilitator of the California Community Economic Resiliency Fund
