= LA Cleantech Incubator =

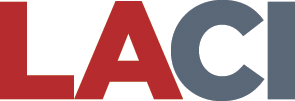
- Type: Nonprofit, Public-Private Partnership
- Industry: Cleantech
- Founded: 2011
- Founder: City of Los Angeles
- Headquarters: Los Angeles, California, United States
- Key people: Matt Petersen, President & CEO
- Website: laincubator.org

LA Cleantech Incubator (LACI) is the City of Los Angeles's official cleantech business incubator established to accelerate the commercialization of clean technology and job creation in the Los Angeles region. LACI's staff of entrepreneurs, market specialists, and researchers combined with its 60+ mentor/advisor network provide expert advice on a full range of issues facing early to growth stage companies, including CEO coaching, financial management, business development, IP, and more. The organization is run "by entrepreneurs, for entrepreneurs" and pursues public objectives by harnessing private methods and resources. In 2014, LACI was ranked by UBI Global as the Number 6 university-affiliated business incubator in the world out of 800+ incubators in 67 countries.

== History ==
LACI was founded in 2011 to empower the City of Los Angeles' primary economic strategy, which is to drive the innovation and growth of Los Angeles' green economy. LA Cleantech Incubator was funded by the CRA/LA and the LADWP for the City of Los Angeles, as well as a federal award from the Small Business Administration, and is a result of the Clean Tech Los Angeles (CTLA) alliance among the Mayor's office, the University of Southern California, the University of California at Los Angeles, the California Institute of Technology, the Art Center College of Design, the Los Angeles County Economic Development Corporation, the Los Angeles Business Council, the Los Angeles Area Chamber of Commerce, LADWP, and the CRA/LA.

At LACI's official launch night, Los Angeles Mayor Antonio Villaraigosa said, "The Los Angeles Cleantech Incubator is an important investment in the future of our great city. LACI will have an important role in developing new profitable businesses and creating jobs right here in LA. With this project, we take a big leap forward, toward a stronger and more sustainable economy that will help distinguish LA as a center of innovation and prosperity."

== Company ==
LACI is located in Los Angeles' emerging Cleantech Corridor in the Arts District of downtown Los Angeles. Situated in a four mile long strip between the Los Angeles River and Alameda in the eastern part of downtown, the Cleantech Corridor is the cornerstone of the city's green economy strategy. Startups apply to become an LACI Portfolio Company online through a process that includes an analysis of the applicant's business model, interviewing the management team, reviewing financials, and checking references.

In August 2023, LACI received a $1.5 million Community Project Funding grant from the Department of Housing and Urban Development (HUD). With this, it will help install public charging infrastructure for electric freight trucks going between the Port of Los Angeles and other distribution centers.

In its first 10 years, it helped 340 clean technology startups raise almost $680 million.

=== Strategic Imperative ===
LACI's Strategic Imperative is to move "the country off of its dependence on foreign fuels...California has already put its stake in the ground with AB 32, requiring all utilities to get 33% of their energy from renewable sources by 2020. And Los Angeles is ahead of every major city by achieving almost 20% of its energy from renewable resources by 2010. The new strategic imperative is to focus the private and public sectors on the processes and technologies regarding the sustainable consumption of our natural resources."

== La Kretz Innovation Campus ==
The La Kretz Innovation Campus is a cleantech center for cleantech innovation and commercialization activities opened on October 7, 2016. The 3.2-acre campus includes a 61,000 square-foot warehouse that hosts a variety of cleantech companies and municipal bodies, as well as a research and development facility and a work force training center. LACI moved its operations into the La Kretz Innovation Campus upon completion of construction. The building is an adaptive reuse of an old warehouse and was designed by John Friedman Alice Kimm Architects.
