= Doctors House =

Historic building in California

- U.S. National Register of Historic Places
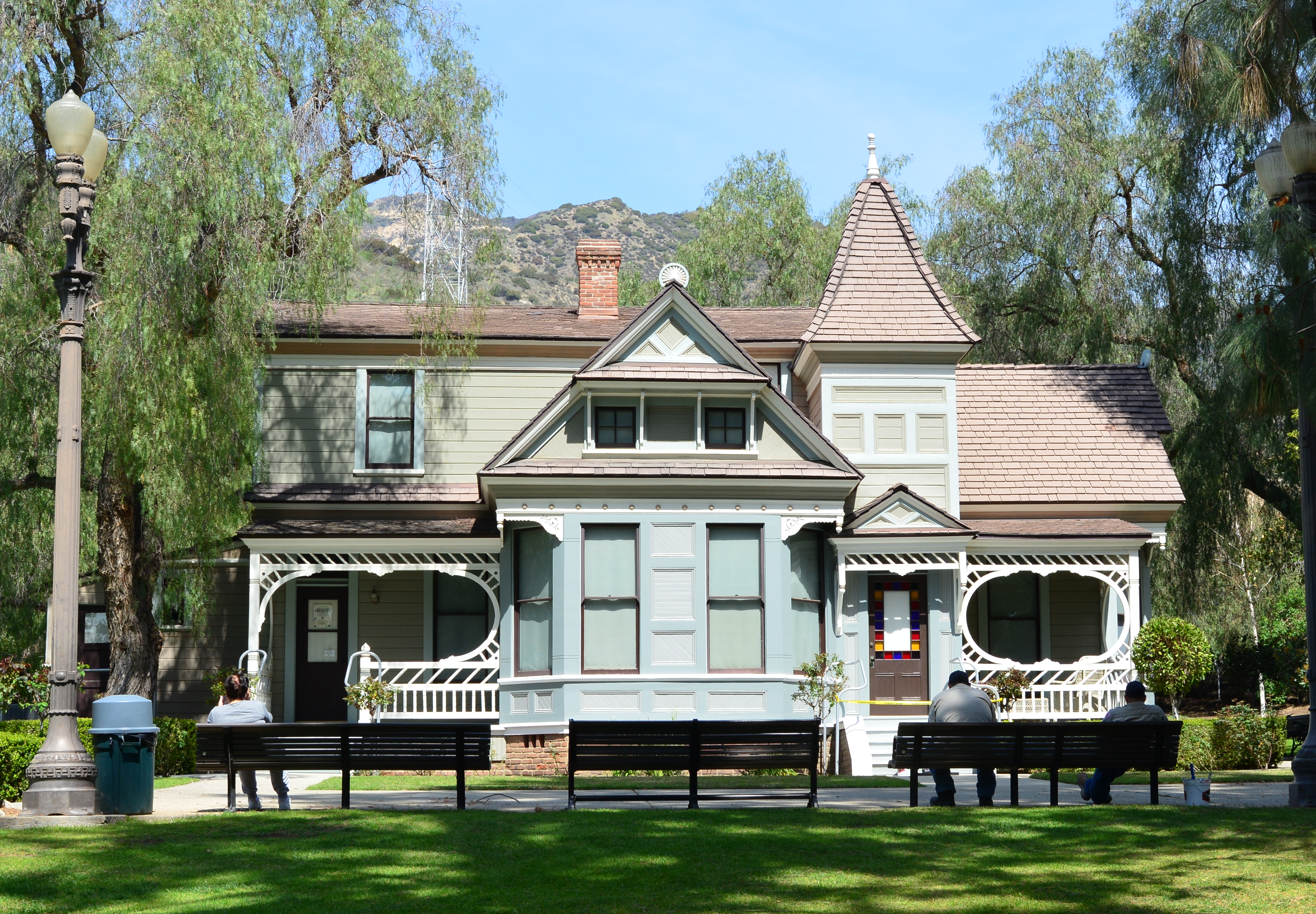
- The house in 2025

- Location within the Los Angeles metropolitan area Location within California Location within the United States
- Location: 1692 Brand Park Dr, Glendale, CA 91201
- Coordinates: 34.1837°N 118.2775°W
- Area: 1,800 sq ft (170 m^{2})
- Built: 1888
- Architect: Ellis T. Byram
- Architectural style: Queen Anne-Eastlake
- NRHP reference No.: 100009362
- Added to NRHP: September 21, 2023

The Doctors House is a historic house in Brand Park in Glendale, California. It was built in 1888 and is one of the only Victorian-style houses left in the city. It is listed on the National Register of Historic Places and Glendale Register of Historic Resources and Historic Districts. It is maintained by the city's Parks, Recreation, and Community Services division.

== History ==
The house was built in 1888 by Ellis T. Byram, a real estate developer, and was originally located at 921 East Wilson Ave. It got its name from being occupied by four separate doctors in a row during its early days. After changing hands twice early on (Emma L. Jay in 1890 and Alice M. Junken in 1894), it was purchased in 1896 by the first doctor, Charles Virgil Bogue. He used one of the rooms as a doctor's office and refurbished the attic as a child's room and playplace while also adding a staircase to the area. David Winslow Hunt was the second doctor, buying the building in 1901. He added another bedroom to the attic and a carriage house to be used as an office.

The third doctor, Allen Lincoln Bryant, did not live in the house for long, vacating it in 1908 to Leonidas Hamlin Hurtt, the fourth and final doctor to occupy the building. Bryant had only lived in the house since 1907. Hurtt remodeled the kitchen and dining room, along with many other aspects of the house, extensively for his new wife. Hurtt lived in the house until 1914. After some more short ownerships, Canadian actress Nell Shipman bought the house in 1917 and lived in it until 1920. She had a menagerie in the house that contained two bear cubs.

The Dzaich and Kordich families, who were related by marriage, bought the house in 1921. They split it into two separate residences and made the parlor on the first floor into a bedroom. The families lived in the house until 1980 when Belmont Plaza Development Co. bought it with plans to demolish the building. The Glendale Historical Society was formed to save it. It was in an agreement with the city in which the city would be responsible for the exterior and landscaping, while the society would be in charge of restoration, the interior, and the museum. The organization moved it to Brand Park in September 1980 and, with the lead of Gregg/Gangi Development Co., restored the home using authentic methods. The relocation and restoration cost $200,000 in total. When restoration was completed in 1984, the house was reopened by the society as a museum.

== Description ==
The 1,800 sq ft (170 m^{2}) house is built in a Queen Anne-Eastlake style. An octagonal gazebo, constructed in 1999, can be found on the property's grounds. Originally, the building was only one story tall, although it had a small attic that could be reached via the pantry ceiling. The foundation of the building is made out of concrete blocks that date to 1980, when it was moved. The museum offers docent-led tours on Sundays.

== Gallery ==
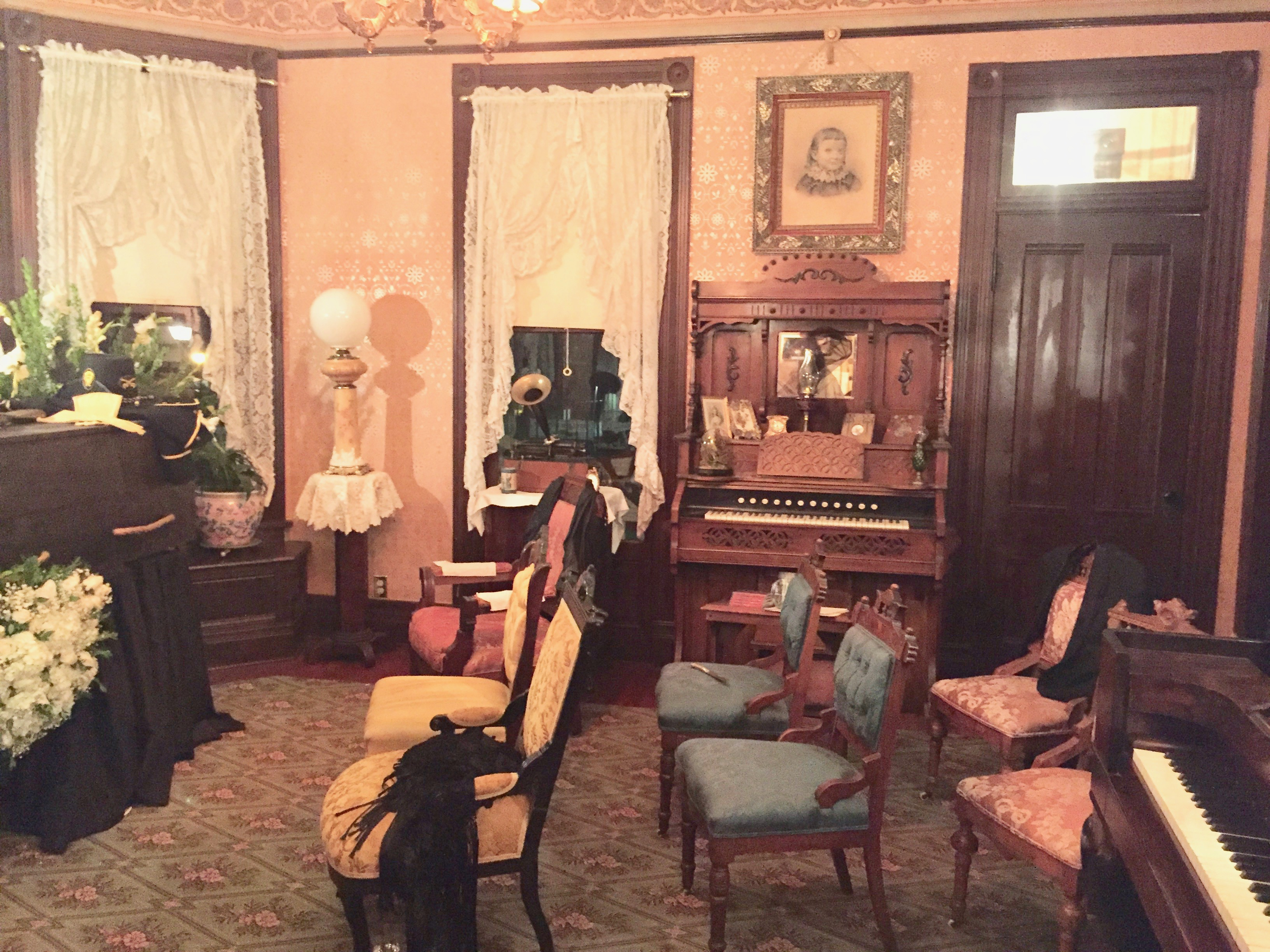
The Doctors House living room

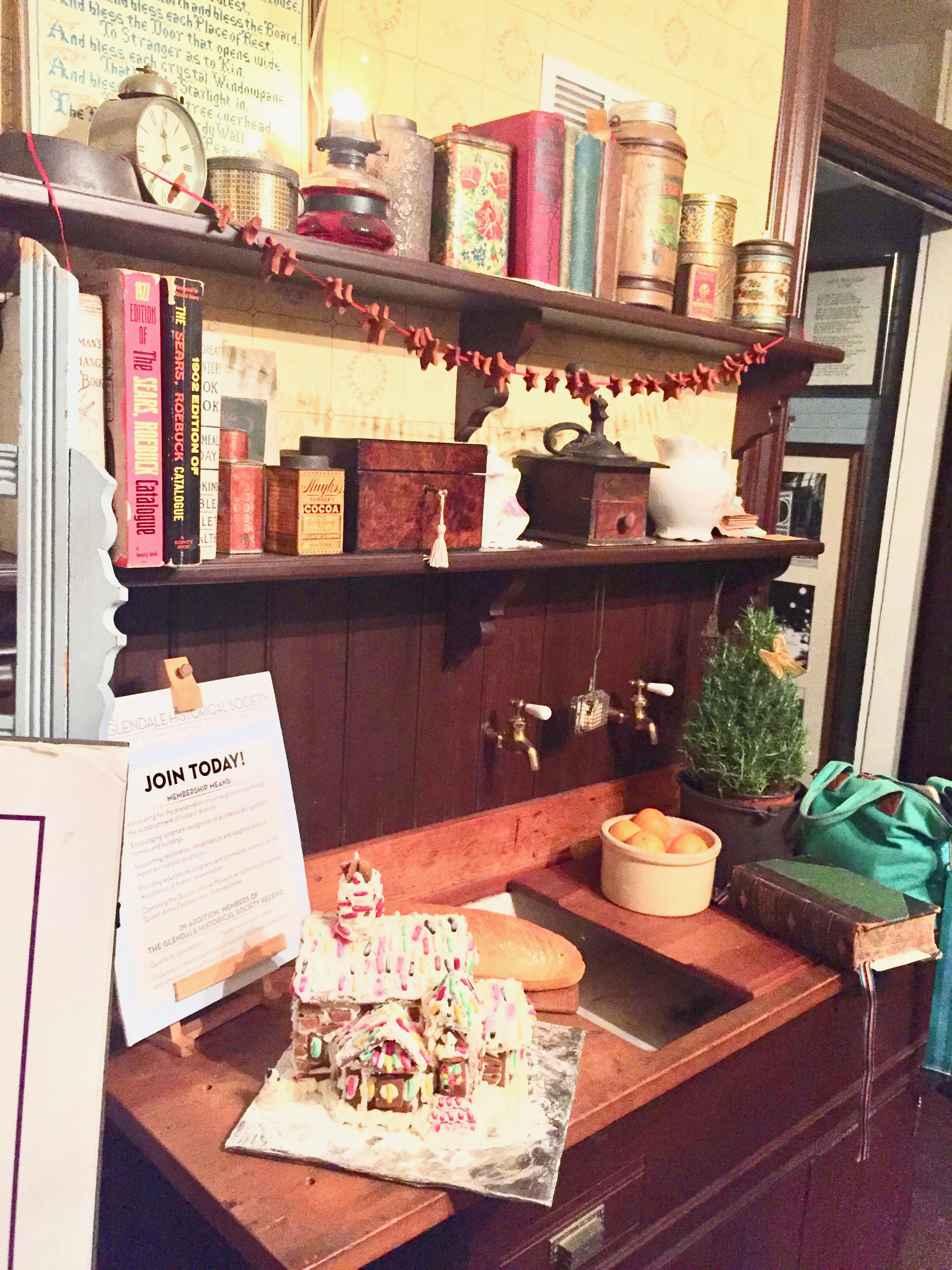
Inside the Doctor's House kitchen

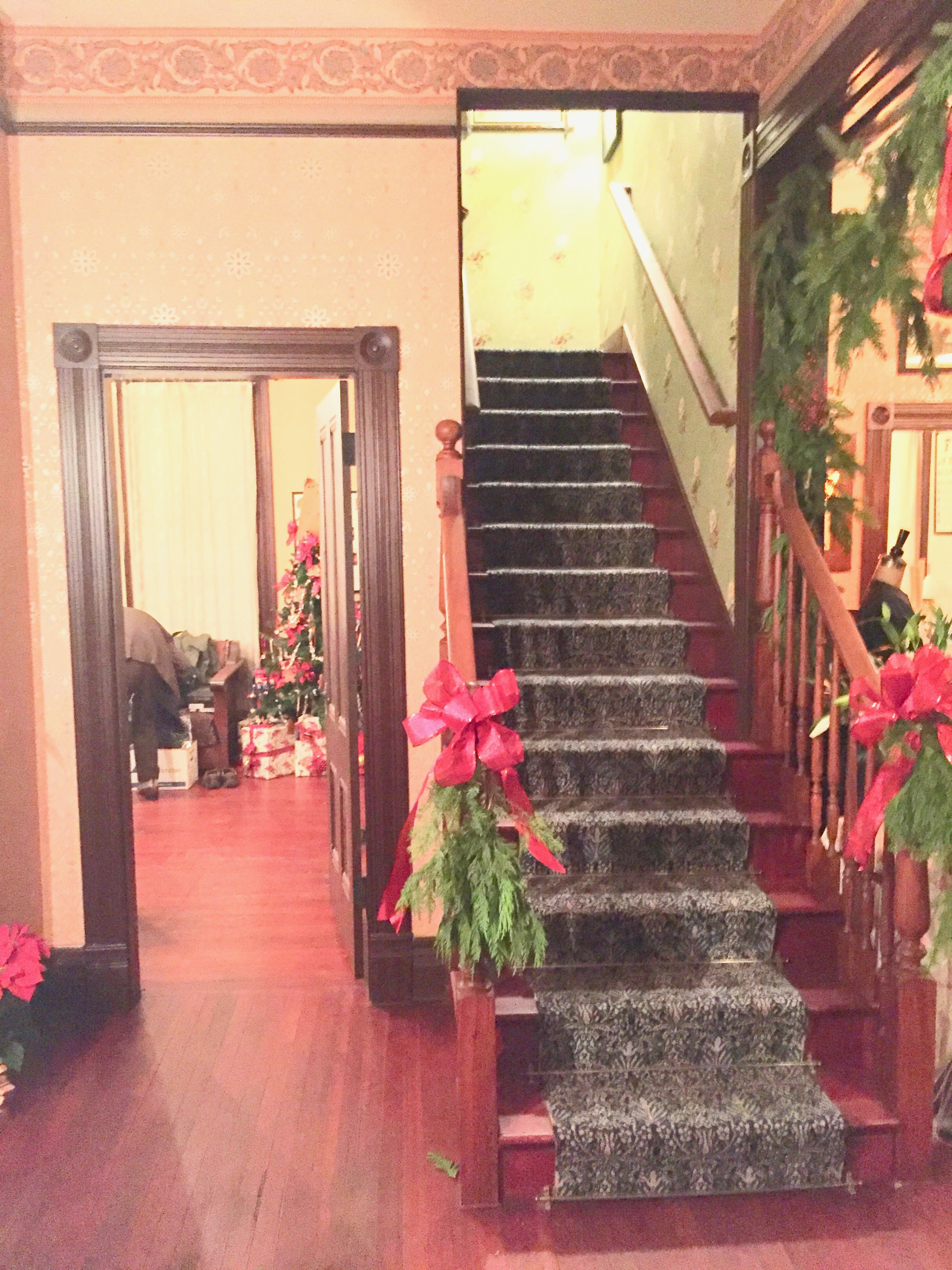
The main staircase

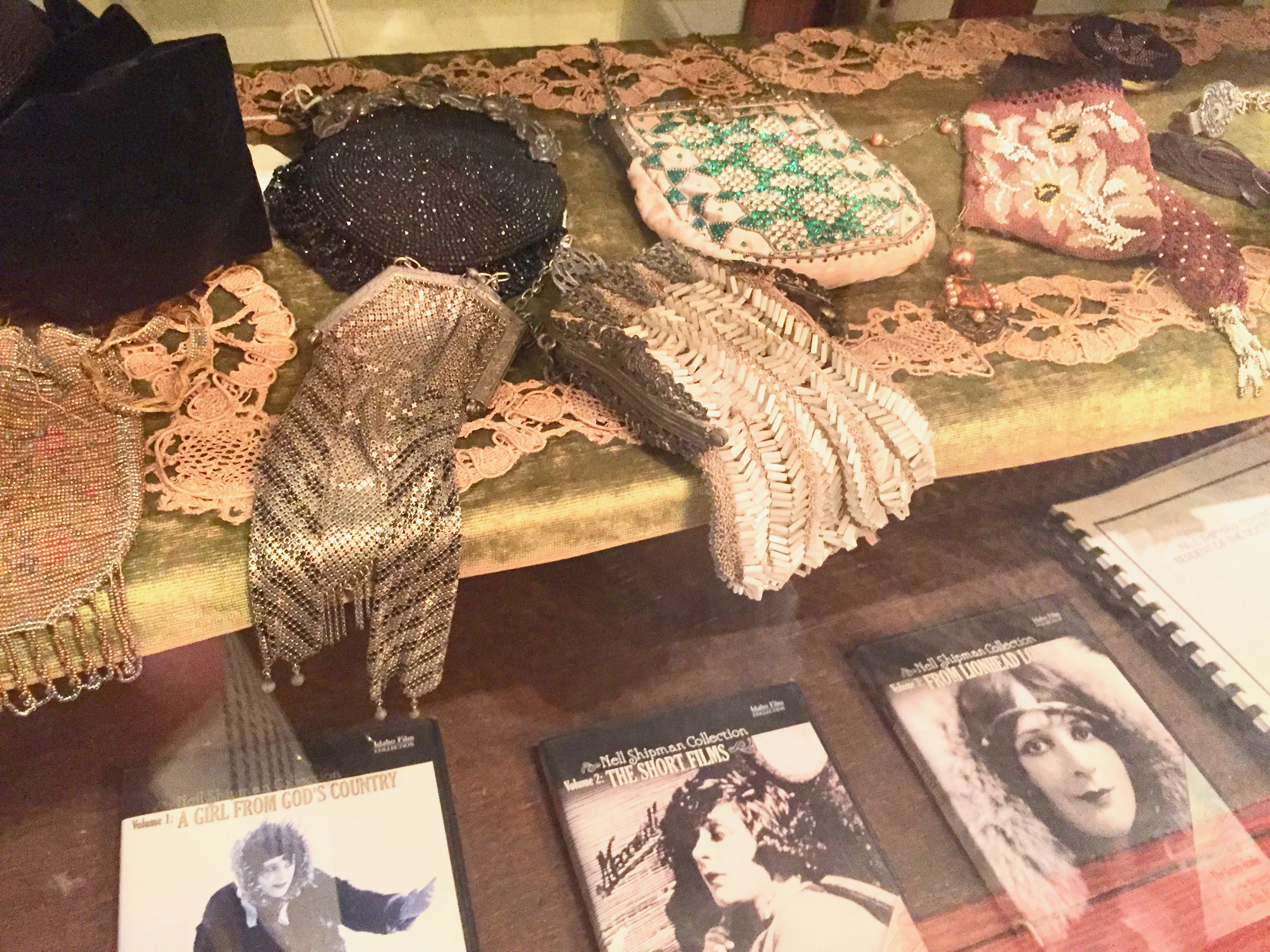
Nell Shipman handbags on display at the Doctors House

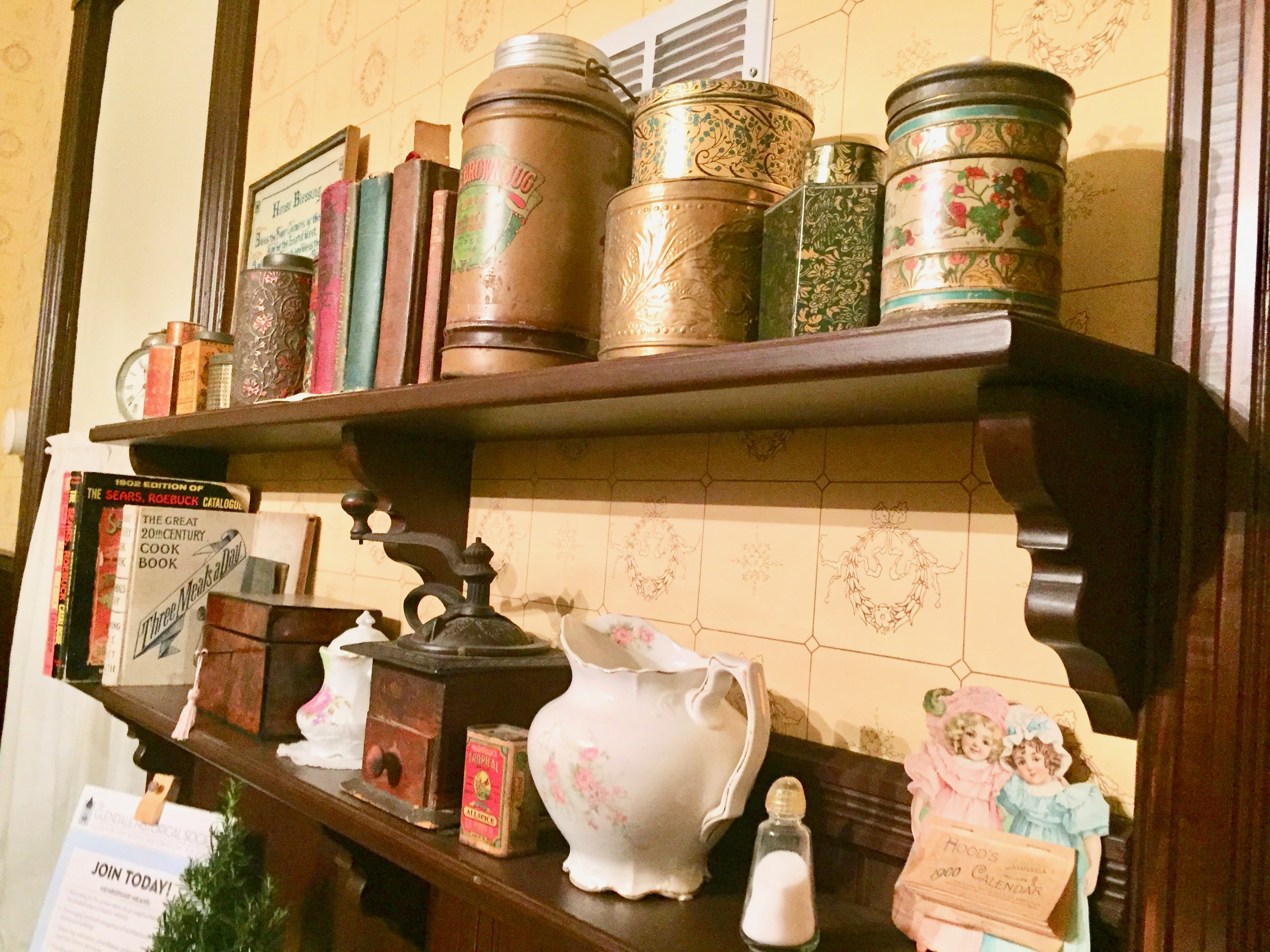
Doctors House kitchen accoutrements

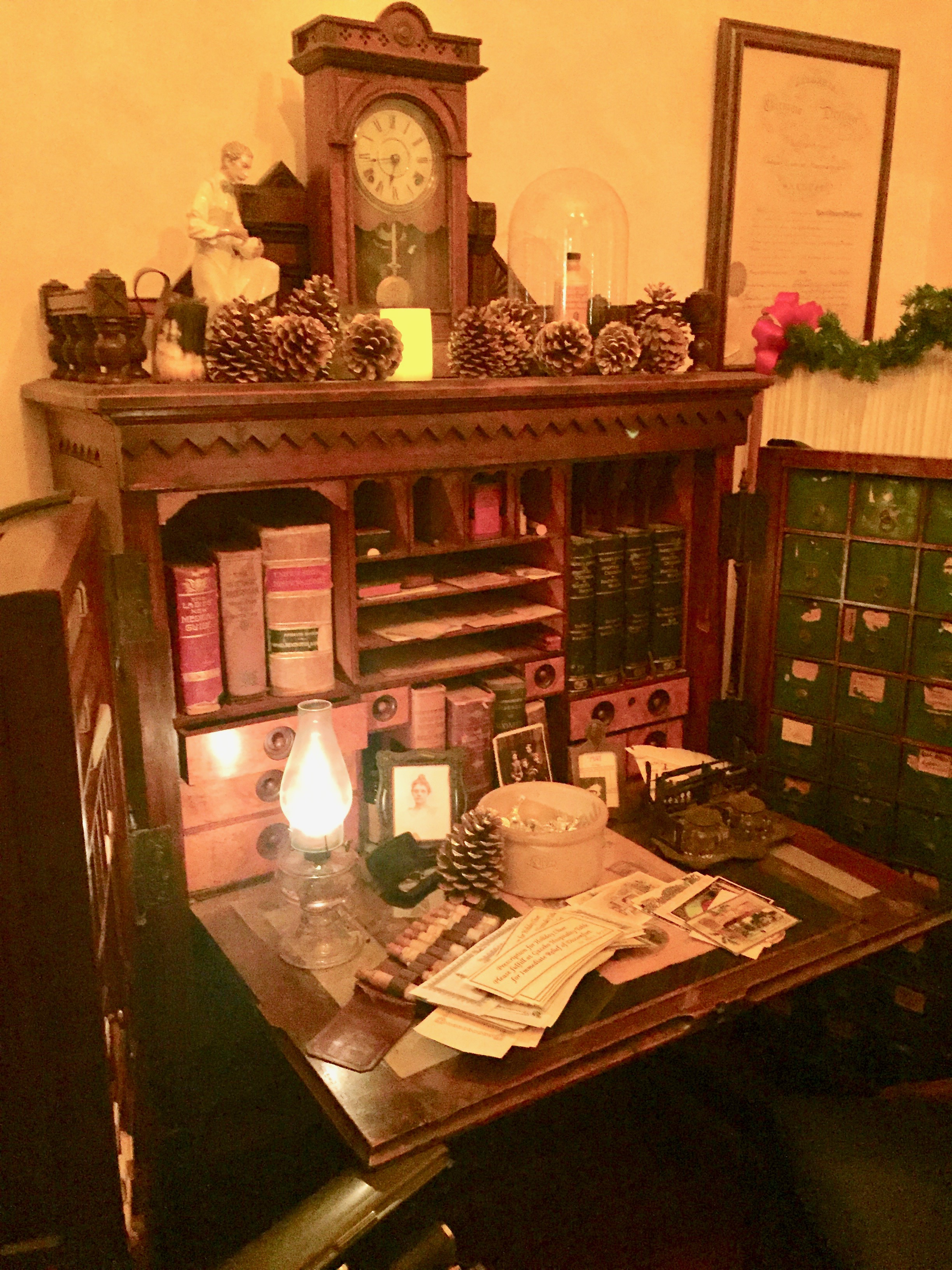
The doctors' pigeonhole desk

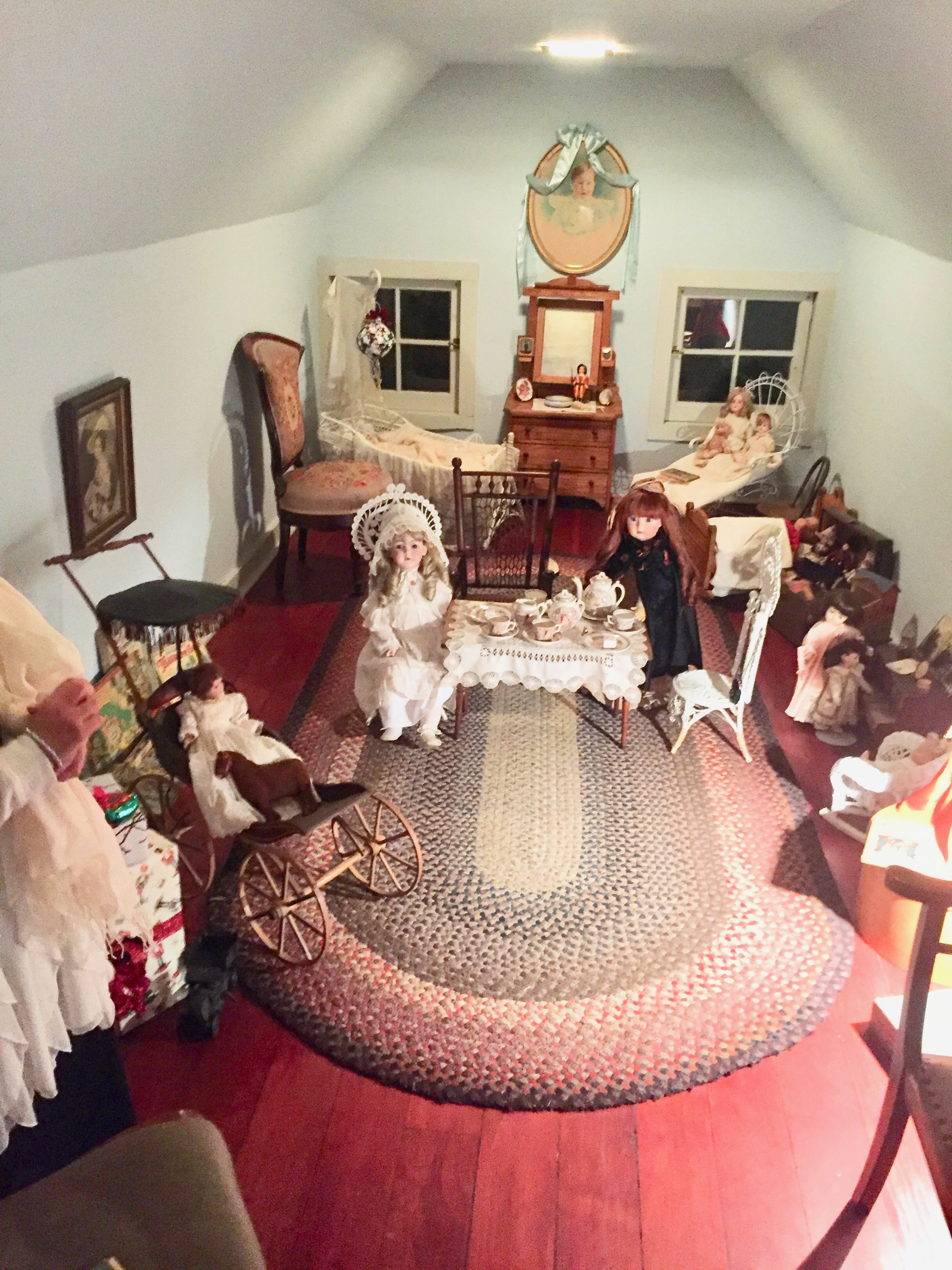
Part of the children's bedroom

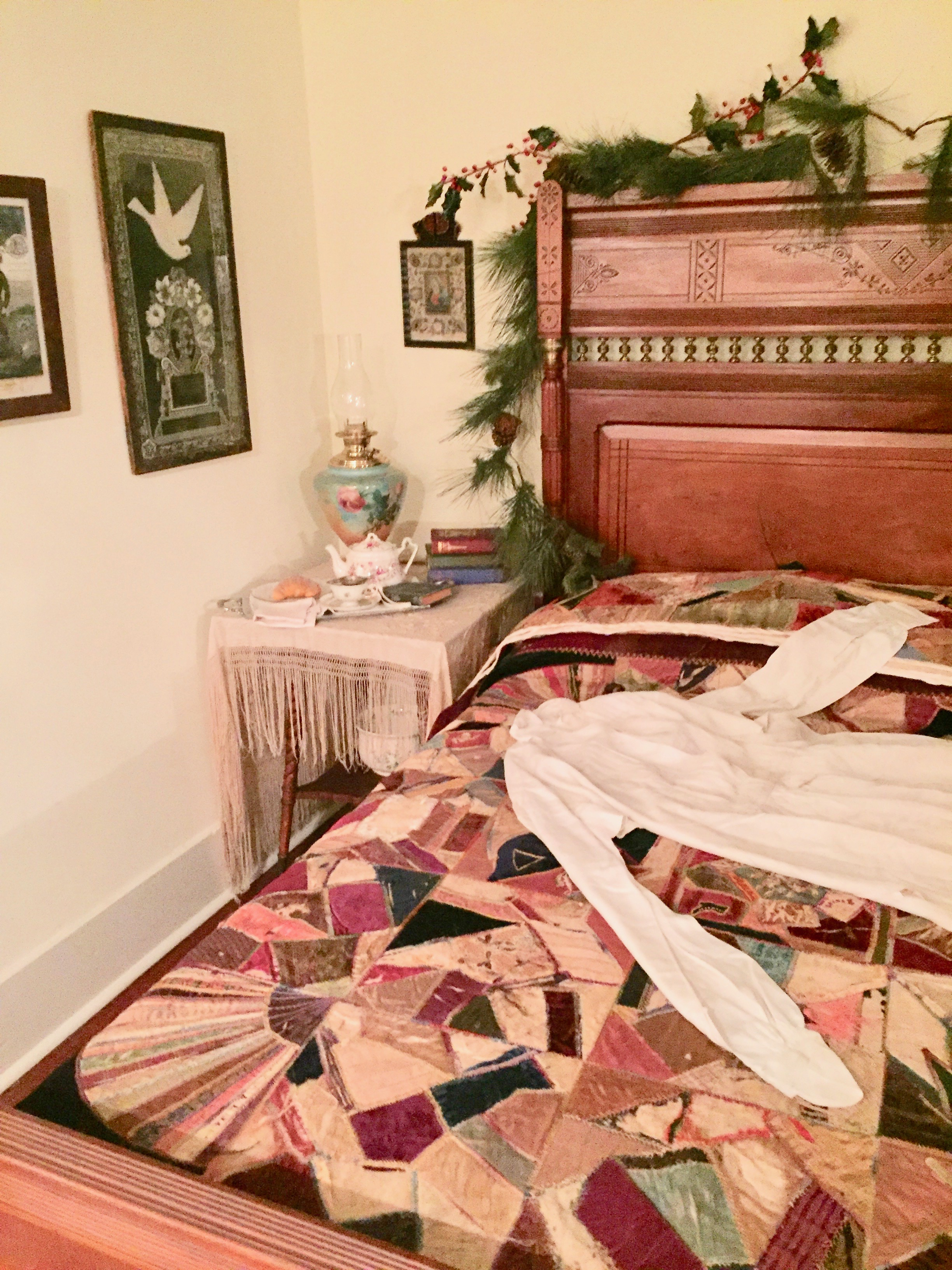
The Doctors House master bedroom.
