= Leslie Coombs Brand =

American real estate developer

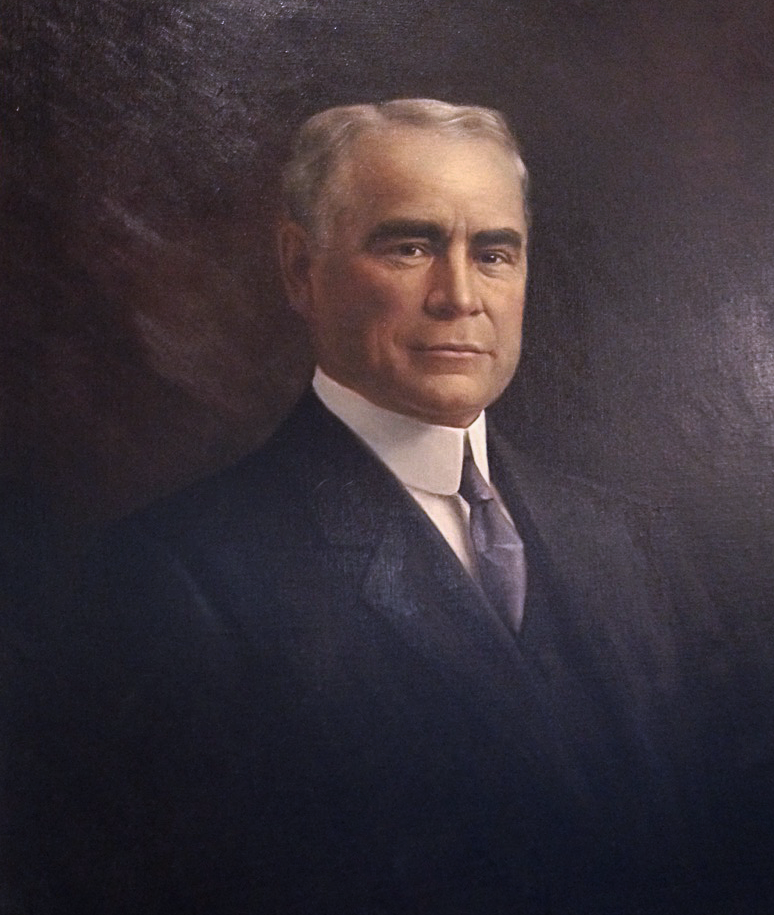
- Born: May 12, 1859; Florissant, Missouri, United States
- Died: April 10, 1925 (aged 65); Glendale, California, United States
- Occupation: Real estate
- Years active: 1879–1925
- Spouse(s): Lulu Broughton, Mary Louise Brand

Leslie Coombs Brand (1859–1925) was an American real estate developer. He is best known for developing Glendale, California.

== Biography ==
=== Early life ===
Brand was born on May 12, 1859, in Florissant, Missouri. He had two sisters, Helen Dryden (b. 1857) and Ada Stocker (b. 1863), and brothers Henry (b. 1853) and Joseph (b. 1868). Their father died when he was ten years old and the family resettled in St. Louis.

At twenty years old, Brand moved to Moberly, Missouri and became a recorder for Randolph County. He soon created a small real estate business with partners in Moberly.

=== Career ===
Brand moved to Los Angeles in 1886 as land development flourished, and formed the Los Angeles Abstract Company with Edwin Sargent on the corner of Franklin and New High Streets. At that time, the real estate business in the Los Angeles area was booming, but unfortunately for Brand and Sargent, financial panic struck in 1892, the market slumped, and the two men sold their business.

Brand spent the next several years outside the state. He met and married Mary Louis Dean in Galveston, Texas in 1891. He witnessed the growth of Galveston and its city center with grand, tree-lined boulevards. Shortly thereafter, the couple returned to Los Angeles, and in October 1895 Brand and Sargent joined forces again to establish the Los Angeles Title Guarantee and Trust Company. Henry E. Huntington of the Los Angeles Railroad Company was also a member of the board. Brand and his wife lived at 917 Douglas in Angelino Heights along with his brother Joe and friend Dan Campbell.

By 1901, the holdings of the Title Guarantee and Trust Company north of downtown Los Angeles became the community of Glendale. At the time it had a population of 550 and was dependent on the telephone and telegraph services of the adjacent town of Tropico. Brand saw the potential for the expansion of towns surrounding Los Angeles, and began to work determinedly on the development of the small community of Glendale. Together with Henry E. Huntington, he formed the San Fernando Valley Land and Development Company.

Brand is often called the father of Glendale due to the role he played in the development of the city in the early 1900s; he partnered with Henry Huntington and Edgar Goode to bring the electric rail to connect Glendale to Los Angeles. At the time the tracks ran up Brand Boulevard to Casa Verdugo between Stocker and Randolph where the company established a restaurant under the management of Mrs. Piedad Yorba de Sowl, which quickly became very popular. At one time he owned Glendale Light & Power Company, the Miradero Water Company and the Consolidated Water Company. He sold the power and water companies to the City of Glendale to provide municipal services to the community. He also established the San Fernando Valley Home Telephone Company providing phone services.

Brand explored the idea of building a residence in the foothills above Glendale where he had purchased land. He hired architect Nathaniel Dryden, his brother-in-law, to design and build a mansion based on the East Indian Pavilion he had seen at the World's Columbian Exposition in Chicago in 1893. Between 1903 and 1904 the house was built and named "El Miradero" by Brand, meaning a high place overlooking an extensive view.

Brand became an airplane enthusiast in part to reduce his commute to his property in Mono Lake. He purchased fifteen acres and built an airstrip below El Miradero for his special ordered army surplus Curtiss JN-6H (Hisso Jenny). The Brands hosted "fly-in" parties with local dignitaries and movie stars of the silent era. Brand and his wife enjoyed entertaining at their home and had pilots on staff to fly himself and his guests.

=== Personal life ===
Brand married Lulu Broughton in 1883, but she died a few months later. He later married Mary Louise Dean in 1891 (1871–1945). His sister married the architect Nathaniel Dryden (1849–1924). Since they had no children of their own, Mr. Brand and his wife enjoyed time with their family, including his sisters, nieces and nephews. They were also avid dog owners, several of the Brand dogs are buried in the Brand cemetery. On the grounds of El Miradero there were many facilities for recreation, including a swimming pool, tennis courts, horse stables, gardens and greenhouse.

Brand had an affair with Birdie Esther Carpenter (1891–1954), who he met on a train from Oregon to California. They married in Tijuana, Mexico when Birdie became pregnant with their first child. Birdie took the name Gordon for their marriage. They had 2 children, Lee Carl Muir Gordon (1922–2006) and Jack Gordon (1923–1979). Birdie lived at property at Rinaldi Street and Laurel Canyon Boulevard eventually selling and moving to a duplex on Brand Boulevard. She died on July 1, 1954.

In the summer of 1924, Leslie Brand was diagnosed with terminal cancer and he convalesced at home. He decided to donate his home and acreage to the city of Glendale to be used exclusively as a public library and park. He was reported to have been terminally ill in March 1925 and died on April 10, 1925. Upon the death of Mary Louise Brand in 1945, El Miradero, it's gardens and parkland became the property of the city of Glendale, designated as Brand Park. The home would be used for cultural purposes until the opening of the Brand Library and Art Center in 1956.

Actress Claire Dodd was married to Brand's grand-nephew, Harry Brand Cooper, and is buried in the Brand Family cemetery in Brand Park.

=== Legacy ===
- The Brand Library and Art Center branch of the Glendale Public Library is named in his honor.
- Brand Boulevard in Glendale is also named in his honor.
- Brand's interest in airplanes started a movement resulting in the Grand Central Airport in Glendale – a hub of aviation history.
- Brand Park (Mission Hills, Los Angeles)
