= Glendale Water and Power Department =

Glendale Water & Power (GWP) is a municipal utility that serves about 33,744 water and 85,358 electric customers of Glendale, California. It is owned by the City of Glendale, administered by the GWP Commission, and governed by the Glendale City Council.

Glendale Water & Power is designated as a Reliable Public Power Provider (RP3). The RP3 designation is awarded by the American Public Power Association to those public power utilities that help provide customers with safe electric service. For the second year in a row, the GWP has earned the RP3 designation. GWP is one of the 176 public power utilities from 2,000 utilities nationwide to earn this designation.

GWP is using new technology to modernize the facility. it aims to improve clean water and use less energy.

The improvements will also create less cost for GWP and try to help the environment.

== Renewable energy ==
GWP has a history of supporting renewable energy. In 1937, Glendale became one of the first California cities to contract with the Federal Government to purchase hydropower from the Hoover Dam, and has been generating electricity using landfill gas from Scholl Canyon since 1994. More recently, GWP has made long-term investments in wind, small hydroelectric and geothermal generation resources. In addition, GWP built a 261 KW solar photovoltaic generating system on top of the parking garage at Glendale Community College.

GWP adopted the Renewable Portfolio Standard (RPS) in 2004, which is being updated to comply with recent changes in California law. The GWP RPS tries to balance the intent of the Californian Legislature to encourage renewable resources, while taking into consideration the effect on rates, reliability, financial resources, and the goal of environmental improvement. The GWP RPS set an initial goal of 20% of its annual energy requirements from renewable energy sources through 2015, with a step-up to 25% in 2016 and another step-up to 33% by 2020. Today, GWP provides over 20% of its energy requirements from renewable resources.

== History ==
=== Electricity ===
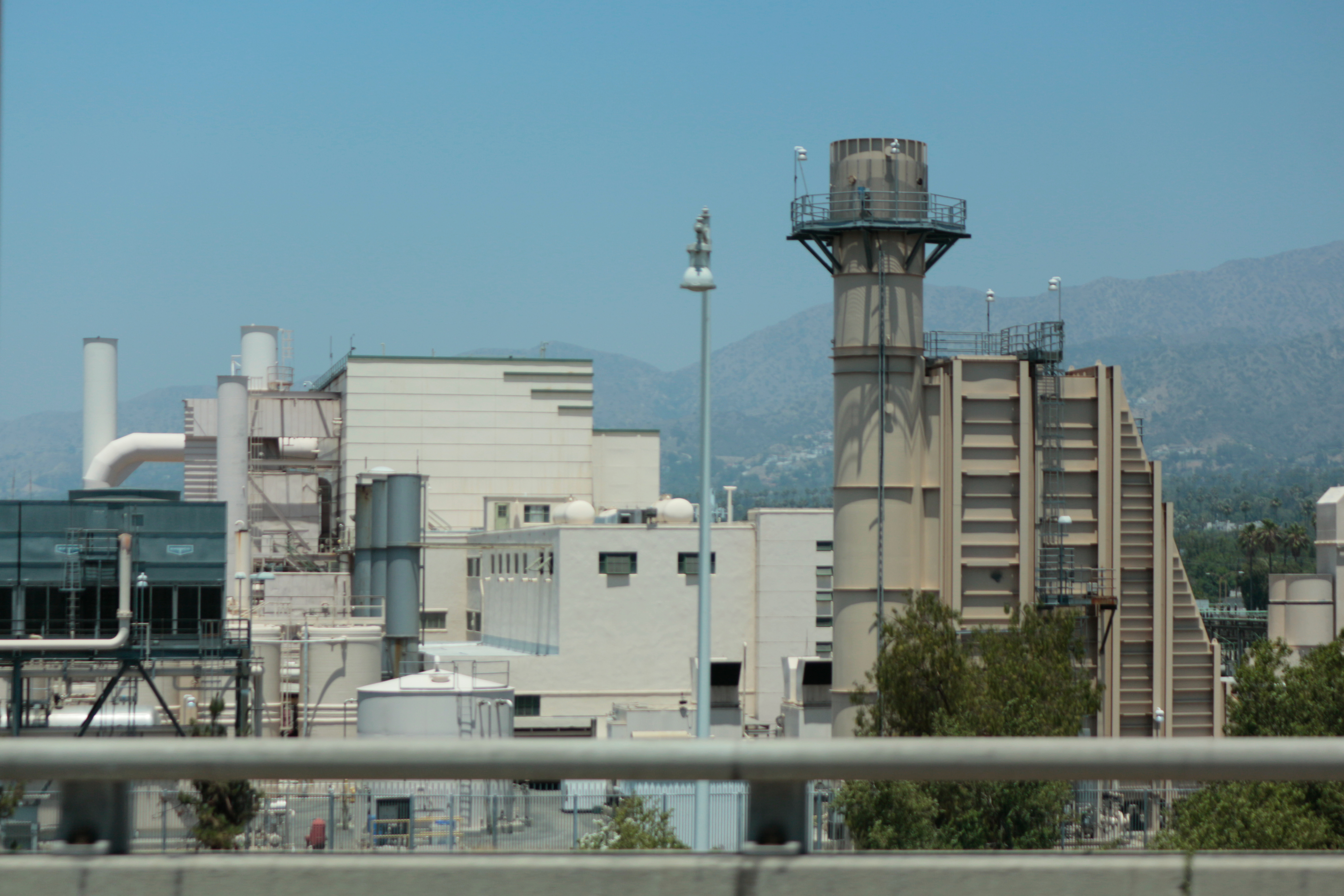
Grayson Power Plant, in Glendale, viewed from the Ventura Freeway, SR-134 in July 2021

Three years after Glendale was incorporated, the city took interest in municipal ownership of its own “light and power” system. In early 1909, Glendale needed street lighting and the cost quoted by electric service companies was expensive. Glendale held a $60,000 bond issue election to acquire and construct an electric works system for the city. It paid $23,000 for the privately owned Glendale Light and Power Company, located within corporate limits. The rest of the money was spent on improvement of the distribution system and expanded to provide power to residences not previously served by the system. Until 1937, the city purchased all of its power from the Southern California Edison Company, the successor to the Pacific Light and Power Company that initially sold the young Glendale utility its electricity. That year, the city entered into contracts to meet growing demand by receiving power from Hoover Dam. However, studies conducted in 1938 showed that this additional power would not be enough after 1942. So the city established its own steam-electric generating plant, Grayson Power Plant (GPP). It was named after the first Chief Engineer and General Manager, Loren Grayson, who received his appointment on April 1, 1951. The first unit, with a capacity of 20,000 kilowatts, entered service in 1941. Over the years, GWP added several units to its Grayson Power Plant, the latest being a 50-megawatt unit added in 2003 that provides enough electricity to serve 10,000 homes.

=== Water Supply ===
In 1906 there were at least 14 private water companies operating in Glendale. By 1913, Glendale placed a $248,000 bond issue before voters to provide funds to purchase and improve the water system to serve a city of 14,000 residents. In 1914 the bond measure passed and the municipal water system began its operation. As the city grew, other water companies were purchased and added to the system. During the first five years of operation, the municipal water system relied almost entirely upon water flowing by gravity from Verdugo Canyon; however, as the city expanded, the utility turned to local groundwater wells to meet additional needs.

In November 1928, the electorates of Glendale and 12 other Southern California cities voted to form the Metropolitan Water District of Southern California and build the Colorado River Aqueduct, due to the challenges of water supply. The aqueduct was completed in 1941, and in 1946 Glendale first tapped into its Metropolitan source. The amount of water purchased from Metropolitan increased over the years, and today accounts for almost two-thirds of the supply. Additional supplies come from local sources, including groundwater. Glendale also uses treated, recycled water for irrigation and street cleaning.
