= Mulholland Dam =

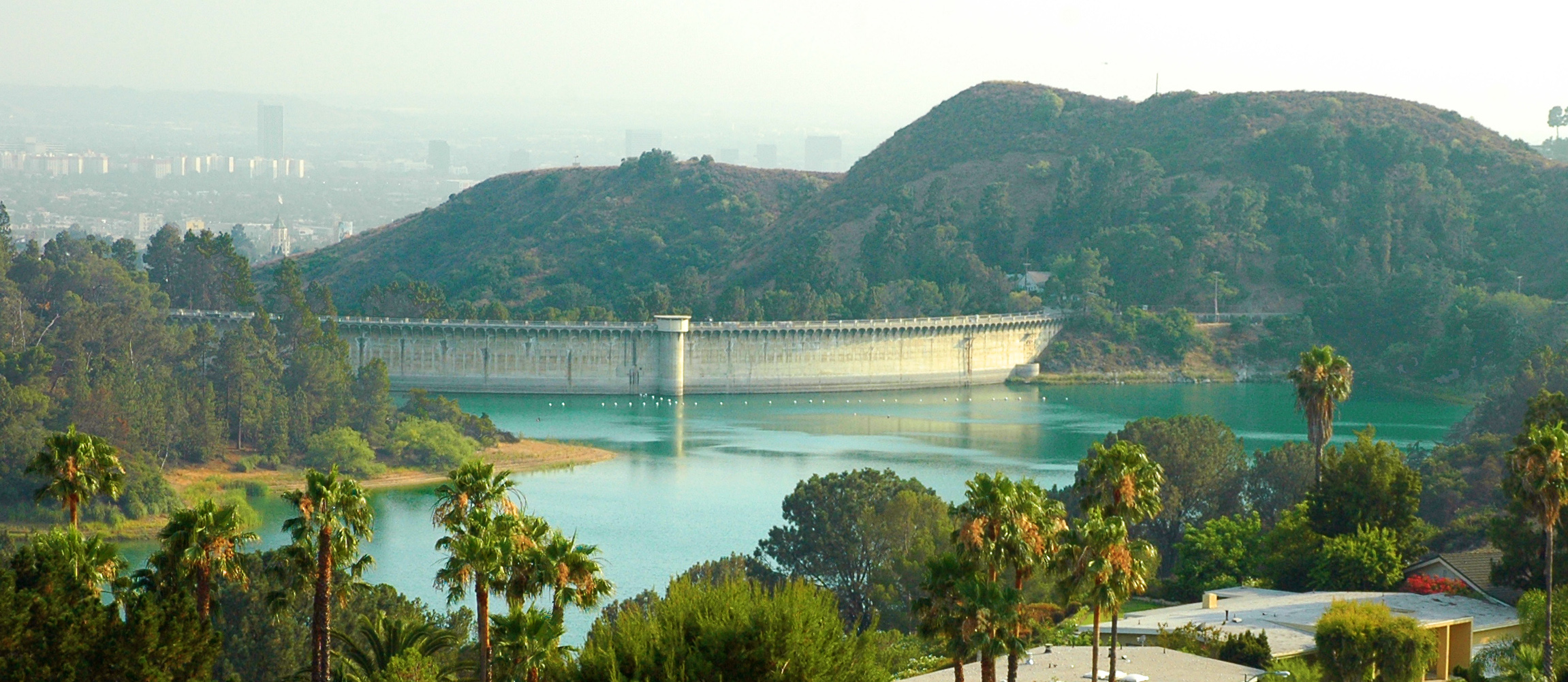
- A view of Hollywood Reservoir and the upstream side of Mulholland Dam
- Interactive map of Mulholland Dam
- Location: Hollywood Hills, Los Angeles, California
- Coordinates: 34°07′5″N 118°19′52″W
- Construction began: 1923; 103 years ago
- Opening date: 1924; 102 years ago
- Owner: Los Angeles Department of Water and Power

Dam and spillways
- Width (crest): 16 feet (4.9 m)

Reservoir
- Creates: Hollywood Reservoir
- Total capacity: 7,900 acre⋅ft (9,700,000 m^{3})
- Maximum water depth: 183 ft (56 m)

Los Angeles Historic-Cultural Monument
- Designated: 1989
- Reference no.: 421

The Mulholland Dam is a Los Angeles Department of Water and Power dam located in the Hollywood Hills of Los Angeles, California, east of the Hollywood Freeway. Designed with a storage capacity of 7,900 acre⋅ft (9,700,000 m^{3}) of water at a maximum depth of 183 feet (56 m), the dam forms the Hollywood Reservoir, which collects water from various aqueducts and impounds the creek of Weid Canyon.

== History ==
The dam was originally named Weid Canyon Dam, then Hollywood Dam. Finally, it was renamed Mulholland Dam after William Mulholland, at the time the General Manager and Chief Engineer of the Bureau of Water Works and Supply, a predecessor of today's Los Angeles Department of Water and Power. Mulholland was responsible for the design and construction of the Los Angeles Aqueduct and much of the city's water system, including many of the early earthen dams and storage reservoirs.

It is located in what was originally called Holly Canyon and then Weid Canyon, after an immigrant from Odense, Denmark, named Ivar Weid, who lived in the canyon after the Civil War and sold some of the land in the 1880s. Ivar Avenue in Hollywood was also named after him.

The area was first surveyed for use as a reservoir in 1912. In 1922, the area was again surveyed, and designs for a masonry dam begun. Construction of the dam began in August 1923. Upon completion in December 1924, the Mulholland Dam became the first curved concrete gravity dam designed and built by the Bureau of Water Works and Supply.

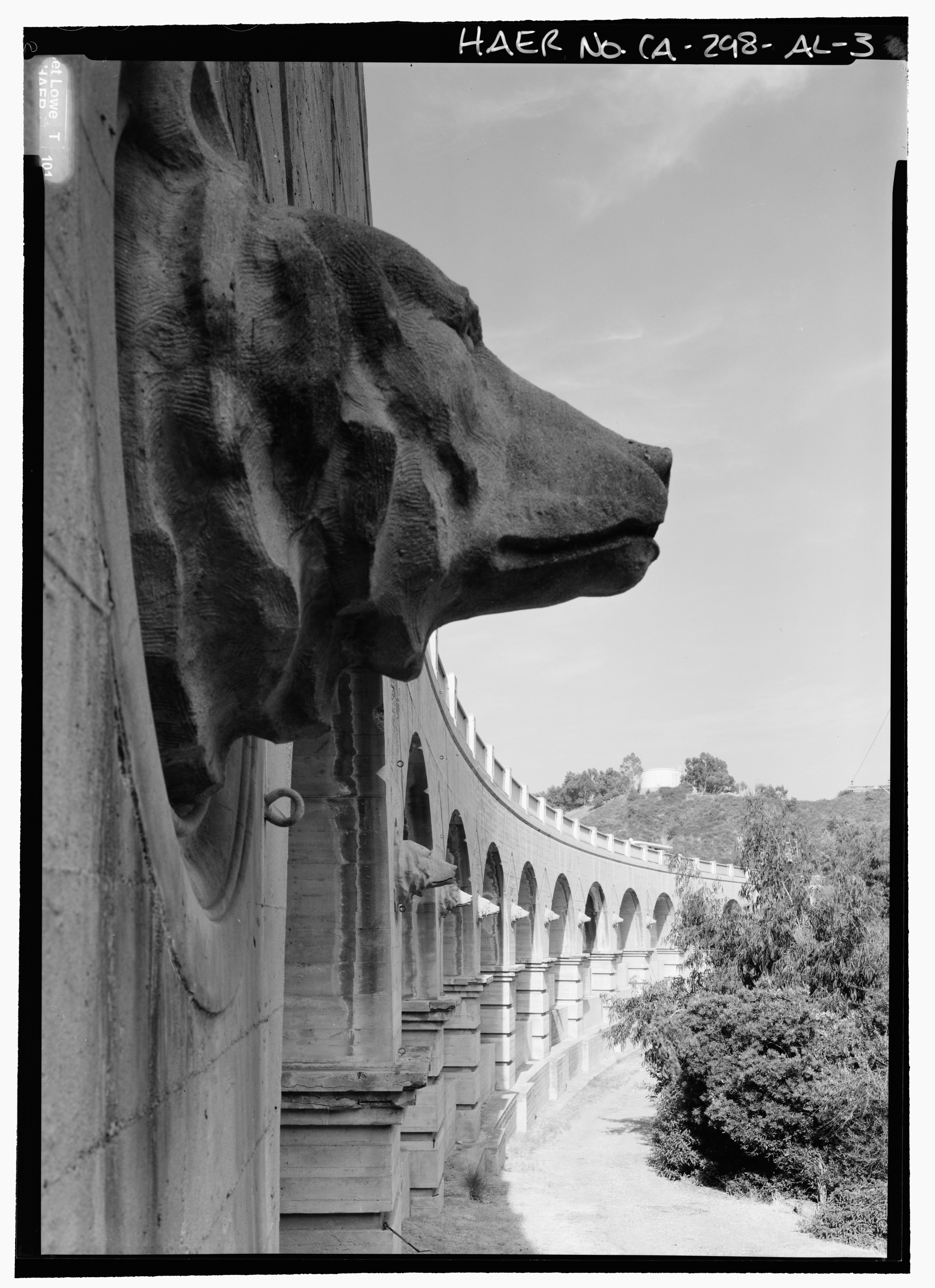
Bear ornaments on downstream side of dam

The St. Francis Dam was also designed and built by the Bureau of Water Works and Supply, and because its design was an adaptation of the Mulholland Dam, it was nearly similar in size and shape. In March 1928, the St. Francis Dam experienced a catastrophic failure, and the resulting flood devastated the Santa Clarita River Valley and took the lives of more than an estimated 430 people. William Mulholland ordered the Hollywood reservoir lowered shortly after the collapse of the St. Francis Dam as a precaution, as well as to help ease public fears of a repeat disaster.

Due to the St. Francis Dam disaster, the California legislature created an updated dam safety program, and, in 1929, the Department of Public Works, under the oversight of the State Engineer, was given authority to review all non-federal dams over 25 feet high or which would hold more than 50 acre-feet of water. The new legislation also allowed the State to employ consultants, as they deemed necessary. Additionally, the State was given full authority to supervise the maintenance and operation of all non-federal dams.

Soon after the failure of the St. Francis Dam, a Committee of Engineers & Geologists to Assess Mulholland Dam was appointed. This was followed in January 1930 by the External Review Panel to evaluate the structure, convened by the State of California. In March 1930, the City of Los Angeles Board of Water & Power Commissioners appointed their own Board of Review for the dam.

Although the state's panel did not recommend modification of the dam, both panels came to a similar conclusion: that the dam lacked what was at the time considered sufficient uplift relief, which might possibly lead to destabilization, and that this was unacceptable. A fourth panel, the Board of Engineers to evaluate Mulholland Dam, was appointed in 1931 to examine the feasibility of abandoning Mulholland Dam. An external Geological Report of the Suitability of Foundations followed this in late 1931, appointed by the Board of Water & Power Commissioners. These believed design deficiencies, made by the engineering department while planning, employed in both the Mulholland and the St. Francis Dam, were brought to light, though given little public notice in 1931.

The decision ultimately made was to keep the Hollywood Reservoir permanently drawn down, its capacity at no more than 4,000 acre⋅ft (4,900,000 m^{3})—the reservoir now is usually maintained at about 2,800 acre⋅ft (3,500,000 m^{3})—and to place an enormous amount of earth, 330,000 cu yd (250,000 m^{3}), on the dam's downstream face. In addition to bolstering its resistance to hydraulic uplift and earthquake forces, it also screened the dam from public view. This work was carried out in 1933–1934, after which the LADWP undertook a forceful program of re-vegetation on the new earth, which succeeded in screening the dam from most everyone's notice. More recent studies have revealed Mulholland Dam to be within the state guidelines for dam safety.

== In popular culture ==
The Mulholland Dam was prominently featured in the 1974 disaster film Earthquake, where, after a catastrophic earthquake destroys Los Angeles, and in the climax of the film, the dam collapses. It also appears in Roman Polanski's Chinatown, and is the location of the photograph "Man on Steps, Bowl (The Thinker)" by Hiromu Kira.

Mulholland Dam is featured in the opening scene of the 1983 film Valley Girl. As the scene continues, the camera pans over the Hollywood hills to a wide angle shot of the San Fernando Valley, cleverly setting up a compare and contrast theme for the rest of the movie between the San Fernando Valley culture of the eighties versus the grittier culture of Hollywood and central Los Angeles. It is also featured in the Season 4 opening of the TV Series 9-1-1.

== See also ==
- California Water Wars
- List of dams and reservoirs in California
- Los Angeles Historic-Cultural Monuments in Hollywood
