= St. Francis Dam =

Former dam in Los Angeles County, California, US

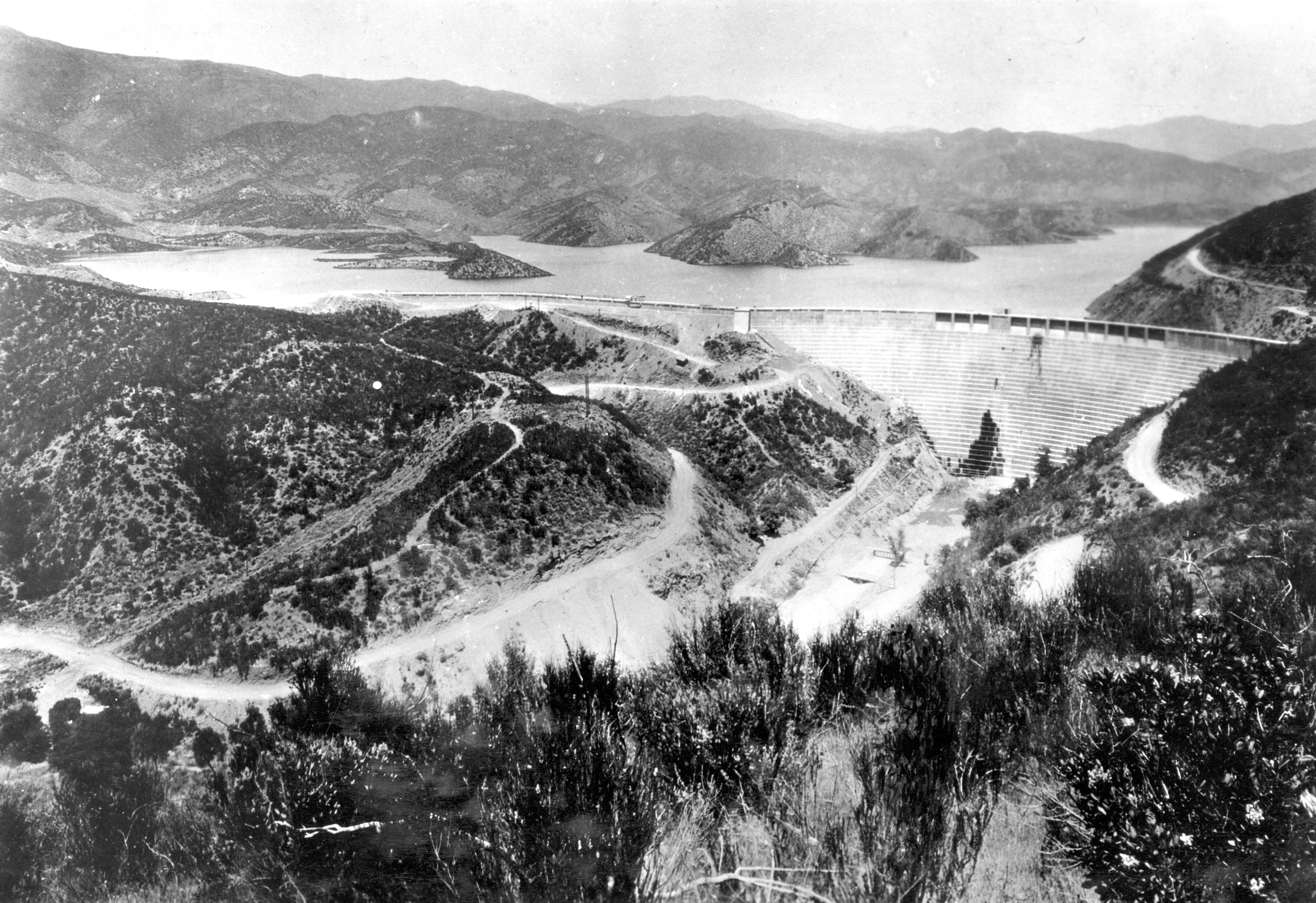
- View of the dam looking north, with water in its reservoir, in February 1927
- Interactive map of St. Francis Dam
- Location: Los Angeles County, California, U.S.
- Coordinates: 34°32′49″N 118°30′45″W
- Construction began: 1924; 102 years ago
- Opening date: 1926; 100 years ago
- Demolition date: 1929; 97 years ago

Dam and spillways
- Impounds: Los Angeles Aqueduct; San Francisquito Creek
- Height: 185 ft (56 m)
- Height (foundation): 205 ft (62 m)
- Length: main dam 700 ft (210 m) wing dike 588 ft (179 m)
- Elevation at crest: parapet 1,838 ft (560 m) spillway 1,835 ft (559 m)
- Width (crest): 16 ft (4.9 m)
- Width (base): 170 ft (52 m)
- Parapet width: 16 ft (4.9 m)
- Hydraulic head: 182 ft (55 m)
- Dam volume: main dam 130,446 cu yd (99,733 m^{3}) wing dike 3,826 cu yd (2,925 m^{3})
- Spillway type: uncontrolled overflow

Reservoir
- Total capacity: 38,168 acre⋅ft (47.080×10^{6} m^{3})
- Catchment area: 37.5 sq mi (97 km^{2})
- Maximum length: 3 mi (4.8 km)
- Maximum water depth: 182 ft (55 m)

California Historical Landmark
- Official name: St. Francis Dam Disaster Site
- Designated: April 26, 1978
- Reference no.: 919

U.S. National Memorial
- Official name: Saint Francis Dam Disaster
- Designated: March 12, 2019

U.S. National Monument
- Official name: Saint Francis Dam Disaster
- Designated: March 12, 2019

The St. Francis Dam, or the San Francisquito Dam, was a concrete gravity-arch dam located in San Francisquito Canyon in northern Los Angeles County, California, United States, that was built between 1924 and 1926. The dam failed catastrophically in 1928, killing at least 431 people in the subsequent flood, in what is considered to have been one of the worst American civil engineering disasters of the 20th century and the third-greatest loss of life in California history.

The dam was built to serve the growing water needs of the city of Los Angeles, creating a large regulating and storage reservoir that was an integral part of the Los Angeles Aqueduct. It was located in San Francisquito Canyon of the Sierra Pelona Mountains, about 40 miles (64 km) northwest of downtown Los Angeles, and approximately 10 miles (16 km) north of the present day city of Santa Clarita.

However, a defective soil foundation and design flaws led to the dam's collapse just two years after its completion. Its failure ended the career of William Mulholland, the general manager and chief engineer of the Bureau of Water Works and Supply (now the Los Angeles Department of Water and Power).

== Background ==
In the early years of Los Angeles, the city's water supply was obtained from the Los Angeles River. This was accomplished by diverting water from the river through a series of ditches called zanjas. At that time, a private water company, the Los Angeles City Water Company, leased the city's waterworks and provided water to the city. Hired in 1878 as a zanjero (ditch tender), William Mulholland proved to be a brilliant employee who, after doing his day's work, would study textbooks on mathematics, hydraulics and geology, thereby teaching himself geology and engineering. Mulholland quickly moved up the ranks of the water company and was promoted to superintendent in 1886.

In 1902, the City of Los Angeles ended its lease with the water company and took control over the city's water supply. The Los Angeles City Council established the Water Department – renamed the Bureau of Water Works and Supply in 1911 – with Mulholland as its superintendent. Mulholland was concurrently named as the Bureau's chief engineer following the organization's name change.

Mulholland achieved great recognition among members of the engineering community when he supervised the design and construction of the Los Angeles Aqueduct, which at the time was the longest aqueduct in the world. It used gravity alone to bring the water 233 miles (375 km) from the Owens Valley to Los Angeles. The project was completed in 1913, on time and under budget, despite several setbacks. Excluding incidents of sabotage by Owens Valley residents during the California Water Wars, the aqueduct has continued to operate well throughout its history and remains in operation today.

== Planning and design ==
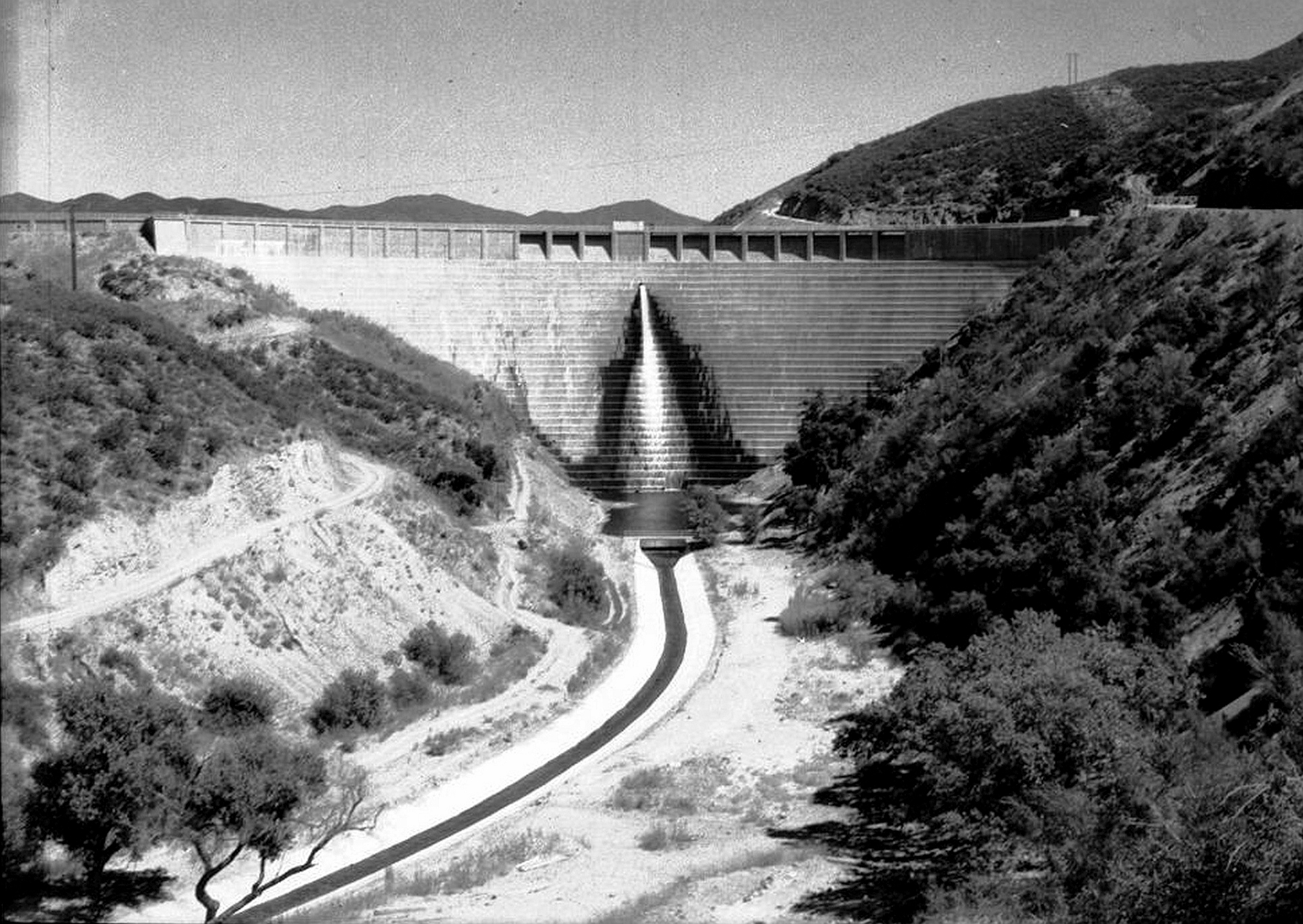
St. Francis Dam in early 1928

It was during the process of building the aqueduct that Mulholland first considered sections of San Francisquito Canyon as a potential dam site. He felt that there should be a reservoir of sufficient size to provide water for Los Angeles for an extended period in the event of a drought or if the aqueduct were damaged by an earthquake. In particular, he favored the area between where the hydroelectric power plants Powerhouses No. 1 and No. 2 were to be built, with what he perceived as favorable topography, a natural narrowing of the canyon downstream of a wide, upstream platform which would allow the creation of a large reservoir area with a minimum possible dam. A large camp had been set up to house the workers near this area, and Mulholland used his spare time becoming familiar with the area's geological features.

In the area where the dam would later be situated, Mulholland found the mid- and upper portion of the western hillside consisted mainly of a reddish-colored conglomerate and sandstone formation that had small veins of gypsum interspersed within it. Below the red conglomerate, down the remaining portion of the western hillside, crossing the canyon floor and up the eastern wall, a drastically different rock composition prevailed. These areas were made up of mica schist that was severely laminated, cross-faulted in many areas, and interspersed with talc. Later, although many geologists disagreed on the exact location of the area of contact between the two formations, a majority opinion placed it at the inactive San Francisquito Fault line. Mulholland ordered exploratory tunnels and shafts excavated into the red conglomerate hillside to determine its characteristics and had water percolation tests performed. The results convinced him that the hill would make a satisfactory abutment for a dam should the need ever arise.

A surprising aspect of the early geologic exploration came later, when the need for a dam arose. Although Mulholland wrote of the unstable nature of the face of schist on the eastern side of the canyon in his annual report to the Board of Public Works in 1911, this fact was either misjudged or ignored by Stanley Dunham, the construction supervisor of the St. Francis Dam. Dunham testified, at the coroner's inquest, that tests which he had ordered yielded results which showed the rock to be hard and of the same nature throughout the entire area which became the eastern abutment. His opinion was that this area was more than suitable for construction of the dam.

The population of Los Angeles had been increasing rapidly. In 1900, the population was slightly more than 100,000. By 1910, it had more than tripled to 320,000, and by 1920 it had reached 576,673. This unexpectedly rapid growth brought a demand for a larger water supply. Between 1920 and 1926, seven smaller reservoirs were built and modifications were made to raise the height of the water bureau's largest of the time, the Lower San Fernando reservoir, by seven feet, but the need for a still-larger reservoir was clear.

Originally, the planned site of this new large reservoir was to be in Big Tujunga Canyon, above the community now known as Sunland, in the northeast portion of the San Fernando Valley, but the high asking prices of the ranches and private land which had to be acquired were, in Mulholland's view, an attempted hold-up of the city. He ceased attempts at purchasing those lands and, either forgetful of or disregarding his earlier acknowledgement of geological problems at the site, renewed his interest in the area he had explored twelve years earlier, the federally owned and far less expensive private land in San Francisquito Canyon.

== Construction and modification ==
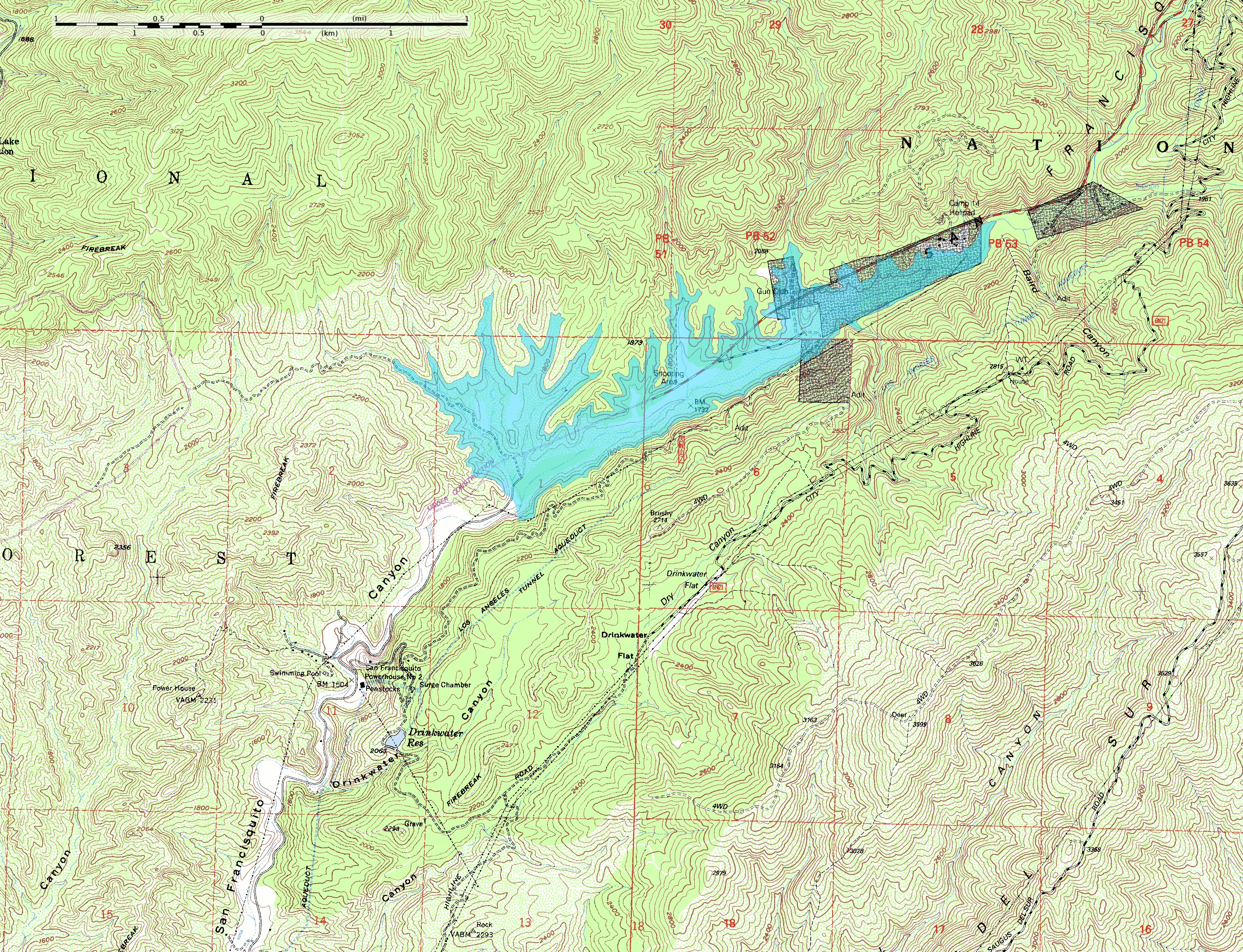
The approximate extent of the reservoir created by the dam

The process of surveying the area and determining the location for the St. Francis Dam began in December 1922. Clearing of the site and construction began without any of the usual fanfare for a municipal project of this nature. The Los Angeles Aqueduct had become the target of frequent sabotage by angry farmers and landowners in the Owens Valley and the city was eager to avoid any repeat of these expensive and time-consuming repairs.

The St. Francis Dam, sometimes referred to as the San Francisquito Dam, was only the second concrete dam to be designed and built by the Bureau of Water Works and Supply. The first was the nearly dimensionally-identical Mulholland Dam, on which construction had begun one year earlier. The design of the St. Francis Dam was in fact an adaptation of the Mulholland Dam, with modifications made so as to suit the site. Most of the design profiles and computation figures of stress factors for the St. Francis Dam came from this adaptation of the plans and formulas which had been used in the constructing of the Mulholland Dam. This work was done by the engineering department within the Bureau of Water Works and Supply.

In describing the shape and type of the St. Francis Dam, the word curved is used although, by today's standards, due to the amount of curve in its radius, the dam would be considered arched, therefore making it of the arch-gravity design. It was not so called because the science of arch-gravity dams was still in its infancy. Little was known in the engineering community about the arch effect, how it worked and how loads were transmitted, other than that it did help with stability and support. As such, the dam was designed without any of the additional benefits given by the arch action, which led to its profile being considered conservative, given its size.

Annually, as did most other city entities, the Bureau of Water Works and Supply and the ancillary departments reported to the Board of Public Service Commissioners on the prior fiscal year's activities. From these it is known that the preliminary studies of the area which became the site of the St. Francis Dam, and topographical surveys for the dam, were completed by June 1923. They called for a dam built to the elevation of 1,825 ft (556 m) above sea level, which is 175 ft (53 m) above the stream bed base. These early calculations for a reservoir created by the dam revealed it would have a capacity of approximately 30,000 acre⋅ft (37,000,000 m^{3}).

On July 1, 1924, the same day Mulholland was to submit his annual report to the Board of Public Service Commissioners, Office Engineer W. W. Hurlbut informed him that all of the preliminary work on the dam had been completed. In his report presented to the Board, Mulholland wrote that the capacity of the reservoir would be 32,000 acre-feet (39,000,000 m^{3}). Hurlbut, who also presented the board with his annual report, Report of the Office Engineer, gave a clarification for this change from the prior year's estimate. In his report he wrote that:

...at the St. Francis Reservoir the dam site has been cleared and the foundation trench started. All concrete placing equipment has been contracted for and it is expected actual work of pouring the concrete will start in approximately ninety days. Additional topographic surveys have been completed and disclose a storage capacity of 32,000 acre feet at elevation 1825 feet above sea level.

Construction of the dam itself began five weeks later, in early August, when the first concrete was poured.

In March 1925, prior to Mulholland's report to the Board of Public Service Commissioners, Hurlbut again reported to Mulholland on the progress of the St. Francis project. He stated the reservoir would now have a capacity of 38,000 acre-feet (47,000,000 m^{3}) and that the dam's height would be 185 feet (56 m) above stream bed level. Hurlbut wrote, in an explanation of these changes that was presented to the Board of Public Service Commissioners, that:

Additional surveys and changes in the plans for this reservoir have disclosed the fact that at crest elevation of 1835 feet above sea level the reservoir will have a capacity of 38,000 acre-feet.

This 10-foot (3.0 m) increase in the dam's height over the original plan of 1923 necessitated the construction of a 588-foot-long (179 m) wing dike along the top of the ridge adjacent to the western abutment in order to contain the enlarged reservoir.

A distinctive aspect of the St. Francis Dam was its stepped downstream face. While the height of each step was a constant 5 feet (1.5 m), the width of each step was unique to its respective elevation above sea level. This width varied between 5.5 feet (1.7 m) near the stream bed base at 1,650 feet (500 m) and decreased to 1.45 feet (0.44 m) at an elevation of 1,816 feet (554 m), the base of the spillways and upright panels.

When completed on May 4, 1926, the stairstep-faced dam rose to a height of 185 feet (56 m) above the canyon floor. Both faces leading up to the crest were vertical for the final 23 feet (7.0 m). On the downstream face, this vertical section was fashioned into 24-foot-wide (7.3 m) sections. A portion of these made up the spillway, which consisted of eleven panels in total divided into two groups. Each spillway section had an open area that was 18 inches (46 cm) high and 20 feet (6.1 m) wide for the overflow to pass. The dam also had five 30-inch-diameter (76 cm) outlet pipes through the center section which were controlled by slide gates attached to the upstream face.

== Dam instability ==
Water began to fill the reservoir on March 12, 1926. It rose steadily and rather uneventfully, although several temperature and contraction cracks did appear in the dam, and a minor amount of seepage began to flow from under the abutments. In accord with the protocol for design, which had been established by the Engineering department during construction of the Mulholland Dam, no contraction joints were incorporated. The most notable incidents were two vertical cracks that ran down through the dam from the top; one was approximately 58 feet (18 m) west of the outlet gates and another about the same distance to the east. Mulholland, along with his assistant chief engineer and general manager Harvey Van Norman, inspected the cracks and judged them to be within expectation for a concrete dam the size of the St. Francis.

At the beginning of April, the water level reached the area of the inactive San Francisquito Fault line in the western abutment. Some seepage began almost immediately as the water covered this area. Workers were ordered to seal off the leak, but they were not entirely successful, and water continued to permeate through the face of the dam. A two-inch (5.1 cm) pipe was used to collect this seepage and was laid from the fault line down to the home of the dam keeper, Tony Harnischfeger, which he used for domestic purposes. Water that collected in the drainage pipes under the dam to relieve the hydrostatic uplift pressure was carried off in this manner as well.

In April 1927 the reservoir level was brought to within 10 feet (3 m) of the spillway, and during most of May the water level was within 3 feet (0.91 m) of overflowing. There were no large changes in the amount of the seepage that was collected and, month after month, the pipe flowed about one-third full. This was an insignificant amount for a dam the size of the St. Francis, and on this subject Mulholland said, "Of all the dams I have built and of all the dams I have ever seen, it was the driest dam of its size I ever saw." The seepage data recorded during the 1926–1927 period shows that the dam was an exceptionally dry structure.

On May 27, 1927, the problems in the Owens Valley escalated once again with the dynamiting of a large section of the Los Angeles Aqueduct, part of the California water wars. A second incident took place a few days later, destroying another large section. In the days that followed, several more sections of the aqueduct were dynamited which caused a complete disruption of the flow. The near-full reservoir behind the St. Francis Dam was the only source of water from the north and withdrawals began immediately.

During this time, the Los Angeles County Sheriff's Department received an anonymous phone call that a carload of men were on their way from Inyo County with the intention of dynamiting the dam and "to get some officers on the way as quick as possible." Within minutes, all personnel of the Bureau of Power and Light and the Bureau of Water Works and Supply either working or residing within the canyon had been notified. Cars carrying dozens of officers from both the Los Angeles Police and Sheriff's Departments rushed to the area. Although no sign of the threat that brought all this about materialized, for many days after, the canyon resembled an armed encampment.

The Daily Record of High Water Elevations of the St. Francis Dam shows that between May 27 and June 30 alone, 7,000 to 8,000 acre-feet (8,600,000 to 9,900,000 m^{3}) of water was withdrawn. Through June and July the Owens Valley fight continued, as did interruptions in the flow from the aqueduct. This in turn caused continued withdrawals from the reservoir. In early August, opposition to Los Angeles's water projects collapsed after the indictment of its leaders for embezzlement. The city subsequently sponsored a series of repair and maintenance programs for aqueduct facilities that stimulated local employment.

The St. Francis reservoir level rose once again, although not without incident. Late in 1927, a fracture was noticed which began at the western abutment and ran diagonally upwards and toward the center section for a distance. As with others, Mulholland inspected the fracture, judged it to be another contraction crack and ordered it filled with oakum and grouted to seal off any seepage. At the same time, another fracture appeared in a corresponding position on the eastern portion of the dam, starting at the crest near the last spillway section and running downward at an angle for 65 feet (20 m) before ending at the hillside. It too was sealed in the same manner. Both of these fractures were noted to be wider at their junction with the hillside abutments and narrowed as they angled toward the top of the dam.

The reservoir continued to rise steadily until early February 1928, when the water level was brought to within one foot (0.3 m) of the spillway. During this time though, several new cracks appeared in the wing dike, and new areas of seepage began from under both abutments. Near the end of February, a notable leak began at the base of the wing dike approximately 150 feet (46 m) west of the main dam, discharging about 0.60 cubic feet (4.5 U.S. gallons, or 17 liters) per second. The fracture was inspected by Mulholland, who judged it to be another contraction or temperature crack and left it open to drain. During the first week of March, it was noticed that the leak had approximately doubled. Due in part to some erosion taking place, Mulholland ordered an eight-inch (20.3 cm) concrete drain pipe to be installed. The pipe led the water along the dike wall, discharging it at the west abutment contact with the main dam. This gave the hillside a very saturated appearance, and the water flowing down the steps of the dam where it abutted the hill caused alarm among the canyon residents and others traveling on the road 700 feet (213 m) to the east, as at that distance it appeared the water was coming from the abutment.

On March 7, 1928, the reservoir was three inches (7.6 cm) below the spillway crest and Mulholland ordered that no more water be turned into the St. Francis Dam. Five days later, while conducting his morning rounds, Harnischfeger discovered a new leak in the west abutment. Concerned not only because other leaks had appeared in this same area in the past but more so that the muddy color of the runoff he observed could indicate the water was eroding the foundation of the dam, he immediately alerted Mulholland. After arriving, both Mulholland and Van Norman began inspecting the area of the leak. Van Norman found the source and by following the runoff, determined that the muddy appearance of the water was not from the leak itself but came from where the water contacted loose soil from a newly cut access road. The leak was discharging 2 to 3 cubic feet (15 to 22 US gal; 57 to 85 L) per second of water by their approximation. Mulholland and Van Norman's concern was heightened not only by the leak's location but by the inconsistent volume of the discharge, according to their testimony at the coroner's inquest. On two occasions as they watched, an acceleration or surging of the flow was noticed by both men. Mulholland felt that some corrective measures were needed, although this could be done at some time in the future.

For the next two hours Mulholland, Van Norman and Harnischfeger inspected the dam and various leaks and seepages, finding nothing out of the ordinary or of concern for a large dam. With both Mulholland and Van Norman convinced that the new leak was not dangerous and that the dam was safe, they returned to Los Angeles.

== Collapse and flood wave ==
Another view of the St Francis Dam after collapse

Two and a half minutes before midnight on March 12, 1928, the St. Francis Dam catastrophically failed.

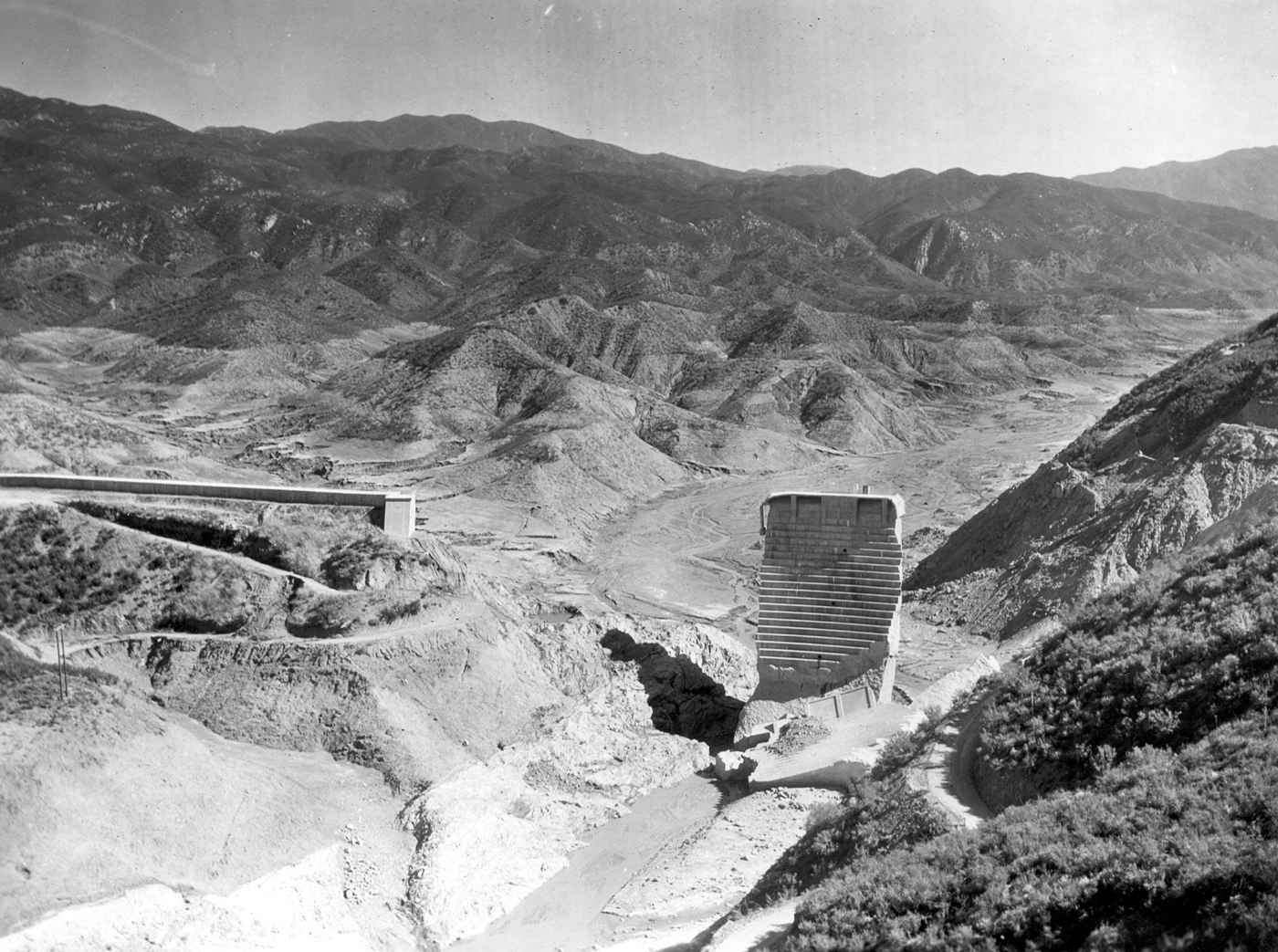
The same view of the "Tombstone" post-collapse. The west (left) abutment was entirely swept away. The inactive San Francisquito Fault is clearly visible, being located along the contact zone of schist and conglomerate.

There were no surviving eyewitnesses to the collapse, but at least five people passed the dam less than an hour before without noticing anything unusual. The last, Ace Hopewell, a carpenter at Powerhouse No. 1, rode his motorcycle past the dam about ten minutes before midnight. At the coroner's inquest, Hopewell testified he had passed Powerhouse No. 2 without seeing anything there or at the dam that caused him concern. He stated at approximately one and one-half miles (2.4 km) upstream he heard, above his motorcycle's engine noise, a rumbling much like the sound of "rocks rolling on the hill." Hopewell stopped, got off his motorcycle and smoked a cigarette while checking the hillsides. The rumbling had begun to fade, and Hopewell assumed the sound was a landslide common to the area. Hopewell finished his cigarette, got back on his motorcycle and left. He was the last person to see the St. Francis Dam intact and survive.

At both of the Bureau of Power and Light's receiving stations in Los Angeles and at the Bureau of Water Works and Supply at Powerhouse No. 1, there was a sharp voltage drop at 11:57:30 p.m. Simultaneously, a transformer at Southern California Edison's (SCE) Saugus substation exploded, a situation investigators later determined was caused by wires up the western hillside of San Francisquito Canyon about ninety feet above the dam's east abutment shorting.

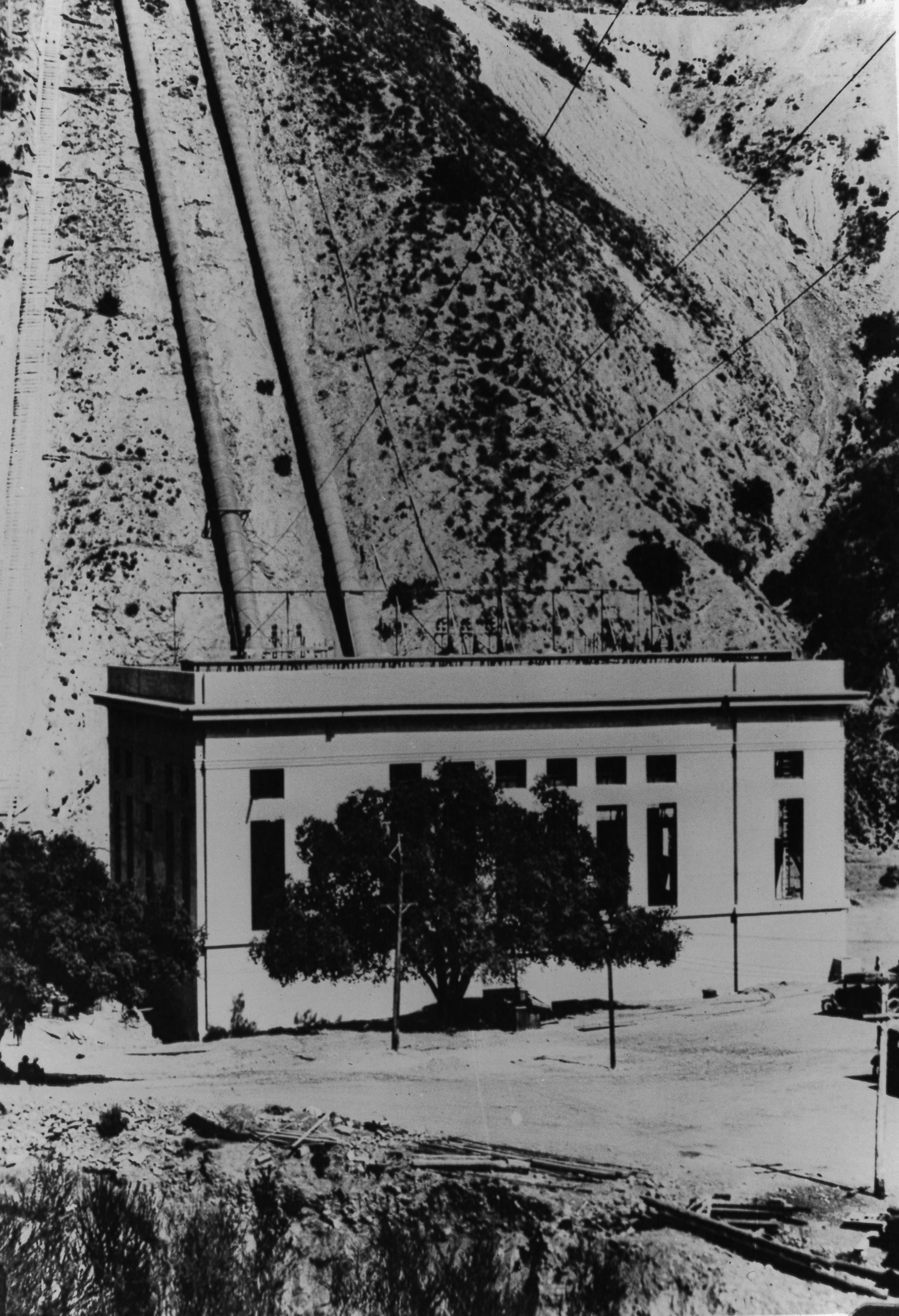
Power Plant 2 before dam collapse

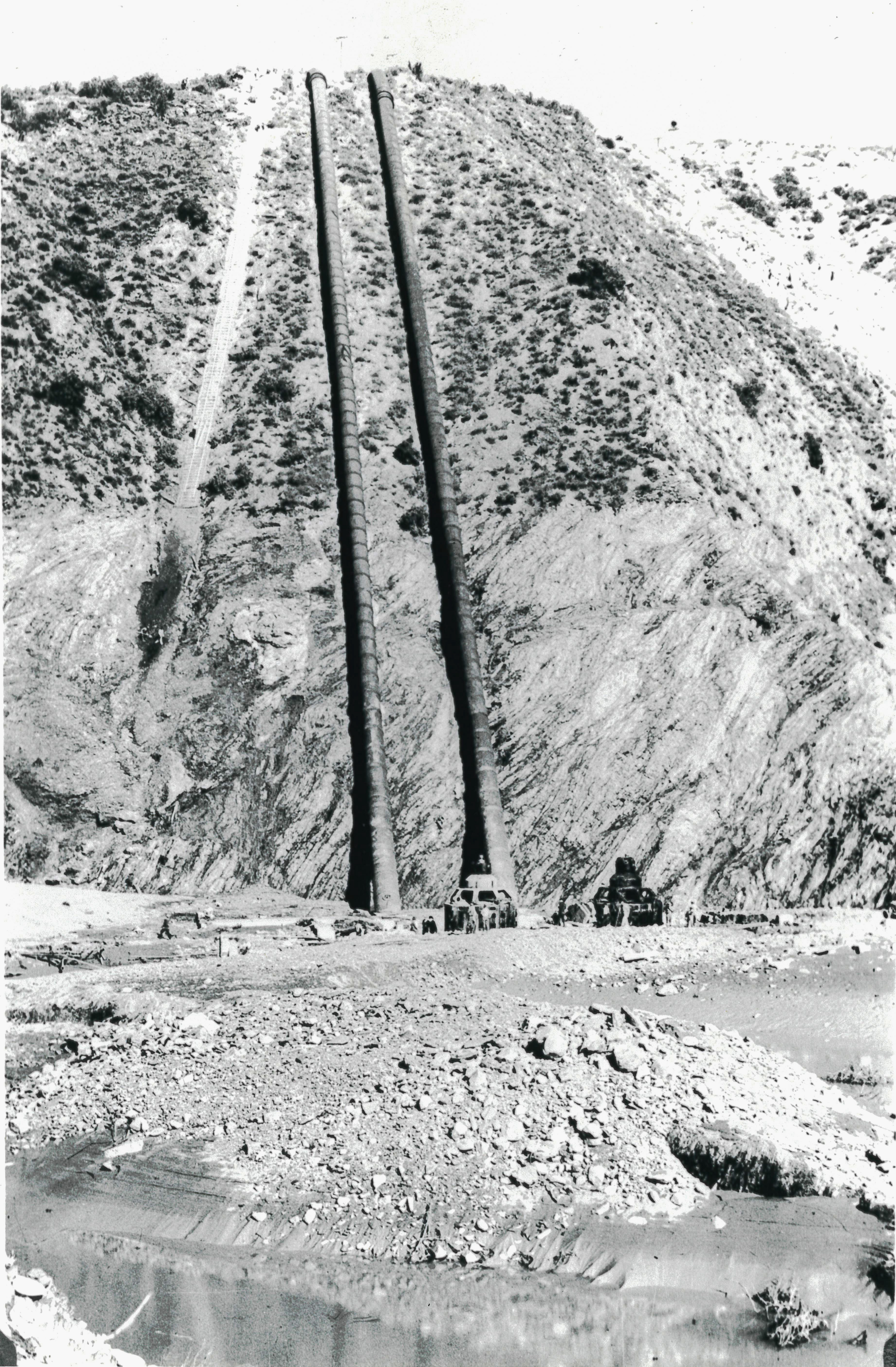
Power Plant 2 after dam collapse

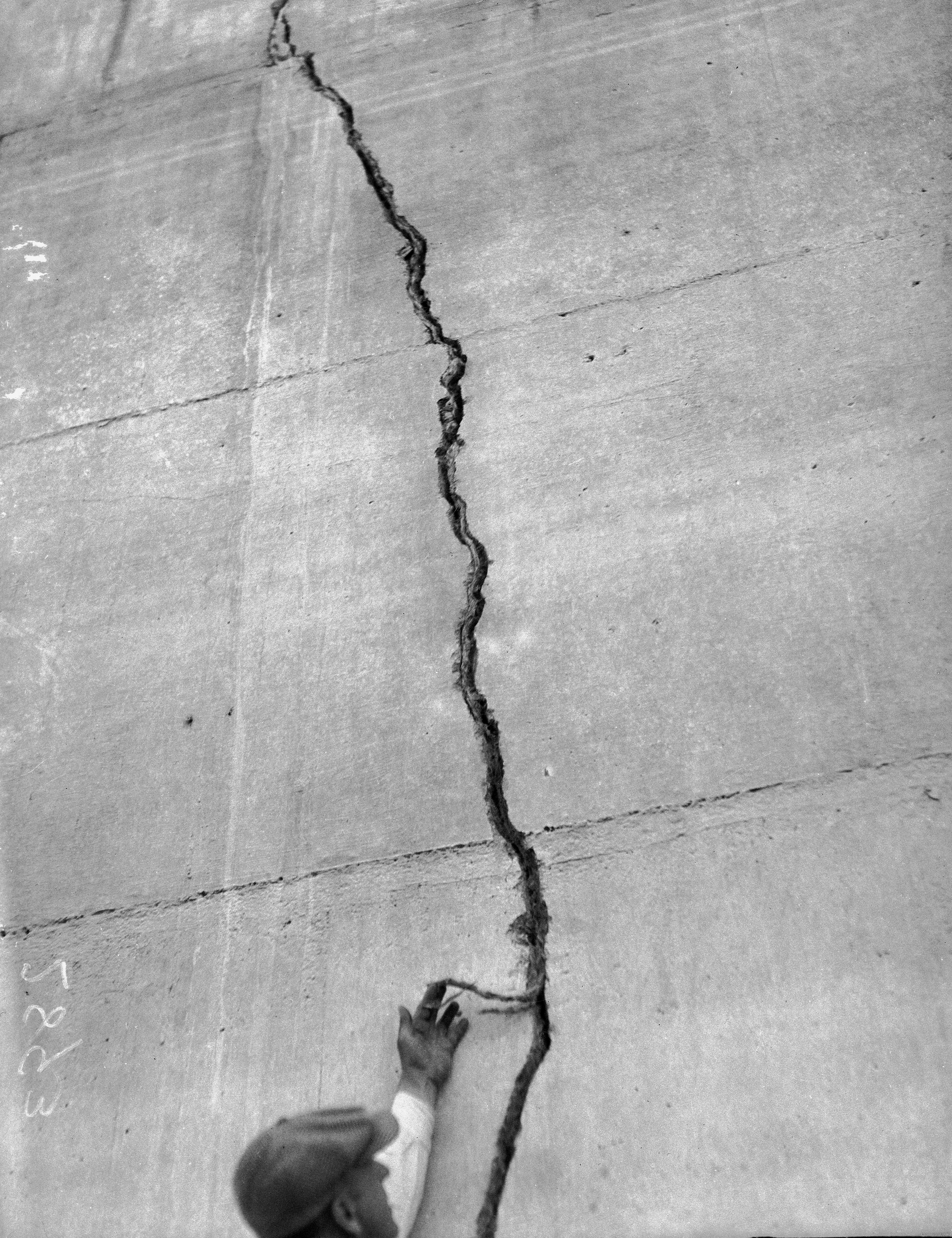
Man pointing at crack in Saint Francis Dam after its collapse

Given the known height of the flood wave, and the fact that within seventy minutes or less after the collapse the reservoir was virtually empty, the failure must have been sudden and complete. Seconds after it began, little of the dam remained standing, other than the center section and wing wall. The main dam, from west of the center section to the wing wall abutment atop the hillside, broke into several large pieces and numerous smaller pieces. All of these were washed downstream as 12.4 billion gallons (47 million m^{3}) of water began surging down San Francisquito Canyon. The largest piece, weighing approximately 10,000 tons (9,000 metric tons) was found about three-quarters of a mile (1.2 km) below the dam site.

Somewhat similarly, the dam portion east of the center section had also broken into several larger and smaller pieces. Unlike the western side, most of these came to rest near the base of the standing section. The largest fragments fell across the lower portion of the standing section, coming to rest partially on its upstream face. Initially, the two remaining sections of the dam remained upright. As the reservoir lowered, water undercut the already undermined eastern portion, which twisted and fell backwards toward the eastern hillside, breaking into three sections.

Harnischfeger and his family were most likely among the first casualties caught in the initial 140 feet (43 m) high flood wave, which swept over their cottage about one-quarter mile (400 m) downstream from the dam. The body of a woman who lived with the family was found fully clothed and wedged between two blocks of concrete near the base of the dam. This led to the suggestion she and Harnischfeger may have been inspecting the structure immediately before its failure. Neither Harnischfeger's body nor that of his six-year-old son were found.

Five minutes after the collapse, the then 120-foot-high (37 m) flood wave had traveled one and one-half miles (2.4 km) at an average speed of 18 miles per hour (29 km/h), destroying Powerhouse No. 2 and taking the lives of 64 of the 67 workmen and their families who lived nearby. This cut power to much of Los Angeles and the San Fernando Valley. Power was quickly restored via tie-lines with SCE, but as the floodwater entered the Santa Clara riverbed it overflowed the river's banks, flooding parts of present-day Valencia and Newhall. At about 12:40 a.m. SCE's two main lines into the city were destroyed by the flooding, re-darkening the areas that had earlier lost power and spreading the outage to other areas served by SCE. Nonetheless, power to most of the areas not flooded was restored with power from SCE's Long Beach steam–electric generating plant.

Near 1:00 a.m. the mass of water, then 55 ft (17 m) high, followed the river bed west and demolished SCE's Saugus substation, cutting power to the entire Santa Clara River Valley and parts of Ventura and Oxnard. At least four miles of the state's main north–south highway was under water and the town of Castaic Junction was being washed away.

The flood entered the Santa Clarita River Valley at 12 mph (19 km/h). Approximately five miles downstream, near the Ventura–Los Angeles county line, a temporary construction camp SCE had set up for its 150-man crew on the flats of the riverbank was hit. In the confusion, SCE personnel had been unable to issue a warning and 84 workers perished. Shortly before 1:30 a.m., a Santa Clara River Valley telephone operator learned from the Pacific Long Distance Telephone Company that the St. Francis Dam had failed. She called a motorcycle officer with the State Motor Division, then began calling the homes of those in danger. The officer went door-to-door warning residents about the imminent flood. At the same time, a deputy sheriff drove up the valley, toward the flood, with his siren blaring, until he had to stop at Fillmore.

The flood heavily damaged the towns of Fillmore, Bardsdale and Santa Paula before emptying both victims and debris into the Pacific Ocean 54 miles (87 km) downstream south of Ventura, at what is now the West Montalvo Oil Field, around 5:30 a.m., at which point the wave was almost two miles (3 km) wide and still traveling at 6 mph (9.7 km/h).

Newspapers across the country carried accounts of the disaster. The front page of the Los Angeles Times ran four stories, including aerial photos of the collapsed dam and the ruins of Santa Paula. In a statement, Mulholland said, "I would not venture at this time to express a positive opinion as to the cause of the St. Francis Dam disaster... Mr. Van Norman and I arrived at the scene of the break around 2:30 a.m. this morning. We saw at once that the dam was completely out and that the torrential flood of water from the reservoir had left an appalling record of death and destruction in the valley below." Mulholland stated that it appeared that there had been major movement in the hills forming the western buttress of the dam, adding that three eminent geologists, Robert T. Hill, C. F. Tolman and D.W. Murphy, had been hired by the Board of Water and Power Commissioners to determine if this was the cause.

== Investigation ==
There were at least a dozen investigations into the disaster. With unprecedented speed, eight of these had begun by the weekend following the collapse. Almost all involved investigative panels of prominent engineers and geologists. The more notable of these groups and committees were those sponsored by Governor C. C. Young, headed by A. J. Wiley, the renowned dam engineer and consultant to the U.S. Bureau of Reclamation's Boulder (Hoover) Dam Board; the Los Angeles City Council, which was chaired by the chief of the Reclamation Service, Elwood Mead; Los Angeles County coroner Frank Nance, and Los Angeles County District Attorney Asa Keyes. Others were convened: the Water and Power Commissioners started their own inquiry, as did the Los Angeles County Board of Supervisors, who hired J. B. Lippincott. The Santa Clara River Protective Association employed the geologist and Stanford University professor emeritus, Dr. Bailey Willis, and eminent San Francisco civil engineer and past president of the American Society of Civil Engineers, Carl E. Grunsky. There were still others, such as the state railroad commission and several political entities who only sent investigators or representatives.

Although they were not unanimous on all points, most commissions quickly reached their conclusions. The governor's commission met on March 19 and submitted their 79-page report to the governor on March 24, only eleven days after the collapse. Although this may have been sufficient time to answer what they had been directed to determine, they had been deprived of the sworn testimony at the coroner's inquest, which was scheduled to be convened March 21, the only inquiry that took into consideration factors other than geology and engineering.

The need for immediate answers was understandable, having its roots in the Swing–Johnson Bill in Congress. This bill, which had first been filed in 1922, and failed to be voted on in three successive Congresses, was again before Congress at the time. This bill ultimately provided the funding for constructing the Hoover Dam. Supporters and responsible leaders alike realized the jeopardy in which the bill stood. Although the water and electricity from the project were needed, the idea of the construction of such a massive dam of similar design, which would create a reservoir seven hundred times larger than the St. Francis, did not sit well with many in light of the recent disaster and the devastation. The bill was passed by Congress and signed into law by U.S. President Calvin Coolidge on December 21, 1928.

The governor's commission was the first to release its findings, titled Report of the Commission appointed by Governor C. C. Young to investigate the causes leading to the failure of the St. Francis dam near Saugus, California. The report became the most widely distributed analysis. Along with most of the other investigators, they perceived the new leak as the key to understanding the collapse, although the commission believed that "the foundation under the entire dam left very much to be desired." The report stated, "With such a formation, the ultimate failure of this dam was inevitable, unless water could have been kept from reaching the foundation. Inspection galleries, pressure grouting, drainage wells and deep cut-off walls are commonly used to prevent or remove percolation, but it is improbable that any or all of these devices would have been adequately effective, though they would have ameliorated the conditions and postponed the final failure." They placed the cause of the failure on the western hillside. "The west end," the commission stated, "was founded upon a reddish conglomerate which, even when dry, was of decidedly inferior strength and which, when wet, became so soft that most of it lost almost all rock characteristics." The softening of the "reddish conglomerate" undermined the west side. "The rush of water released by failure of the west end caused a heavy scour against the easterly canyon wall ... and caused the failure of that part of the structure." There then "quickly followed ... the collapse of large sections of the dam."

The committee appointed by the Los Angeles City Council for the most part concurred in attributing the collapse to "defective foundations", and wrote, "The manner of failure was that the first leak, however started, began under the concrete at that part of the dam which stood on the red conglomerate; this leak increased in volume as it scoured away the foundation material already greatly softened by infiltrated water from the reservoir which removed the support of the dam at this point and since no arch action could occur by reason of the yielding conglomerate abutment, made failure of the dam inevitable." Likewise, they concluded the failure most likely followed a pattern similar to that which was proposed by the governor's commission, although they did acknowledge that "the sequence of failure is uncertain."

The committee ended their report with, "...having examined all the evidence which it has been able to obtain to date reports its conclusions as follows:

1. The type and dimensions of the dam were amply sufficient if based on suitable foundation.
2. The concrete of which the dam was built was of ample strength to resist the stresses to which it would normally be subjected.
3. The failure cannot be laid to movement of the earth's crust.
4. The dam failed as a result of defective foundations.
5. This failure reflects in no way the stability of a well designed gravity dam properly founded on suitable bedrock."

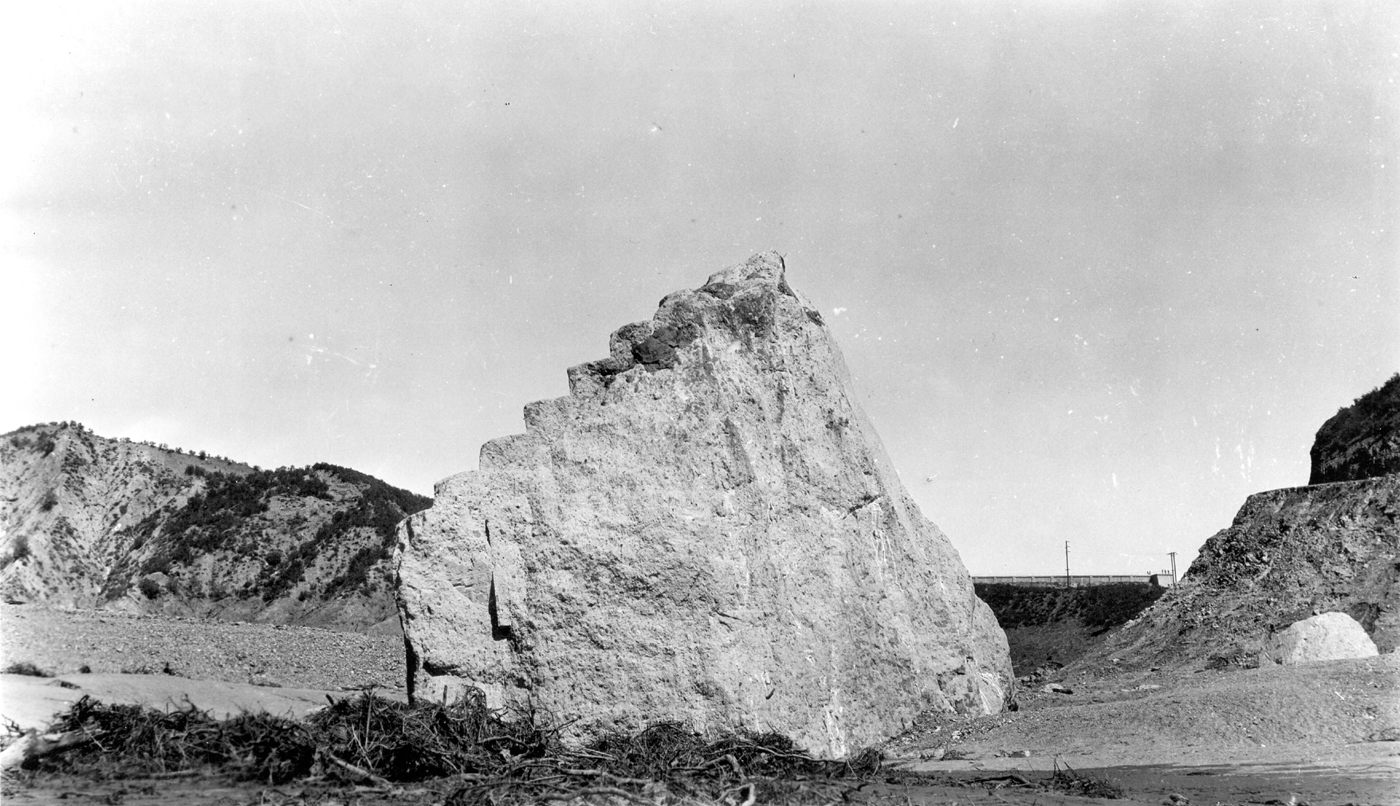
Concrete block from the west abutment of the dam about half a mile (0.8 km) below the dam site. Approximately 63 ft. long, 30 ft. high and 54 ft. wide (19.2 m × 9.1 m × 16.5 m). The wing wall is in the distance.

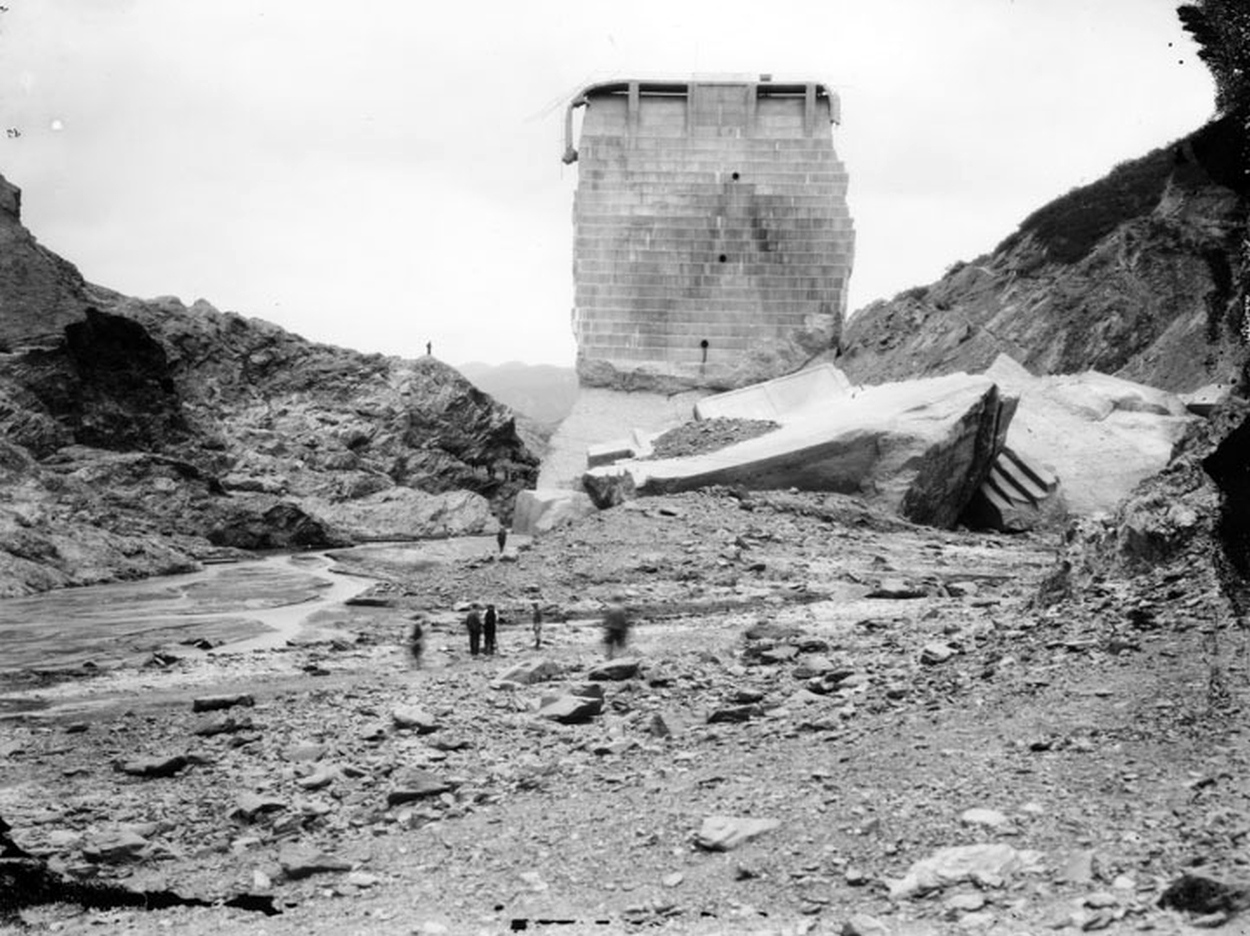
Standing section (the "Tombstone") with fragments from east side of dam.

The consensus of most of the investigating commissions was that the initial break had taken place at or near the fault line on the western abutment, which had been a problem area since water first covered the area. The prevailing thought was that increasing water percolation through the fault line had either undermined or weakened the foundation to a point that a portion of the structure blew out or the dam collapsed from its own immense weight. This was supported by a chart made by the automatic water level recorder located on the dam's center section. This chart clearly showed that there had been no significant change in the reservoir level until forty minutes before the dam's failure, at which time a small though gradually increasing loss was recorded.

The only theory to vary greatly from the others was that of Willis, Grunsky and his son. They believed that the portion of the east abutment below the dam was the first to give way, clearing the way for the collapse to take place. Their investigations, while somewhat collaborative, culminated in two separate reports (one by the Grunskys and the other by Willis) which were completed in April 1928. These reports, according to Grunsky, "were reached independently" and "are in substantial agreement."

Willis and the Grunskys agreed with the other engineers and investigators about the poor quality and deteriorating conditions of the entire foundation, although they maintained that a critical situation developed on the east abutment. Willis, the geologist of the investigative team, was most likely the first to discover the "old landslide" within the mountains which had made the eastern abutment for the dam. In his report, he discussed it at great length and the Grunskys drew substantially on it, as they did his analysis of the schist, for their own report. The Grunskys, as civil engineers, took the lead in that area of the investigation, and in describing the role played by "hydrostatic uplift".

Uplift takes its name from its tendency to lift a dam upward. Although many designers and builders of dams had become aware of this phenomenon by the late 1890s to early 1900s, it was still not generally well understood or appreciated. Nevertheless, it was becoming a matter of debate and a concern to dam builders of this era that water from a reservoir could seep under a dam and exert pressure upward. Due for the most part to inadequate drainage of the base and side abutments, the phenomenon of uplift destabilizes gravity dams by reducing the structure's "effective weight", making it less able to resist horizontal water pressure. Uplift can act through the bedrock foundation: the condition most commonly develops where the bedrock foundation is strong enough to bear the weight of the dam, but is fractured or fissured and therefore susceptible to seepage and water saturation.

According to their theories, water from the reservoir had permeated far back into the schist formation of the eastern abutment. This lubricated the rock and it slowly began to move, exerting a tremendous amount of weight against the dam, which according to the Grunskys was already becoming less stable due to "uplift". Making the situation worse, Willis established, was that the conglomerate, on which the western abutment of the dam rested, reacted upon becoming wet by swelling. In fact, the amount of swelling was such that it would raise any structure built upon it. This hypothesis was reinforced when surveys taken of the wing wall after the failure were compared with those taken at the time it was built. They reveal that in some areas the wall was two to six inches higher than when built. Therefore, the dam was caught between forces that were acting on it much like a vise, as the red conglomerate swelled on one side, and the moving mountain pressed in on it from the other.

In his report, Grunsky concluded:

As soon as the dam was loosened on its base the toe of the structure spalled off. This was probably the beginning of its breaking up, and probably occurred sometime after 11:30 PM during the 23 minutes in which the water in the reservoir apparently fell 3/10 of a foot [9.1 cm]. Thereupon, quite likely, a part of the east end of the dam, meanwhile undermined, went out and the dam at this end lost its hillside support. Hydrostatic uplift at the already loose west and the weight of the remaining portion of the undermined east end caused a temporary tilting of the dam towards the east, accompanied by a rapid washing away of the hillside under the dam at its west end which then also began to break up. The reservoir water was now rushing with tremendous force against both ends and against the upstream face of all that was standing of the dam. This rush of water carried away huge blocks of concrete from both ends of the dam...

There was and remains a difference of professional opinions on the amount of time that elapsed, shown by the chart made by the Stevens automatic water level recorder, from when the line indicating the reservoir level broke sharply downward until it became perpendicular. Most investigating engineers feel the amount of time indicated on the chart is thirty to forty minutes, not the twenty-three minutes that Grunsky stated.

In support of his theory of the dam tilting, Grunsky pointed to an odd clue near the western lower edge of the standing section. Here a ladder had become wedged in a crack that had opened apparently during this rocking or tilting process and then had become tightly pinched in place as the section settled back on its foundation. Measurements taken proved the crack must have been much wider at the time that the ladder entered it. Further, surveys indeed showed the center section had been subjected to severe tilting or twisting. These surveys established that the center section had moved 5.5 inches (14 cm) downstream and 6 inches (15 cm) toward the eastern abutment.

Although this investigation was insightful and informative, the theory, along with others which hypothesized an appreciably increasing amount of seepage just prior to the failure, becomes less likely when it is compared against the eyewitness accounts of the conditions in the canyon and near the dam during the last thirty minutes before its collapse. Grunsky hypothesized, though failed to explain, the action of the dam tilting as he described. This action would have the dam in motion as a single unit while conversely, testimony given at the coroner's inquest indicates that the dam was fractured transversely in at least four places. Furthermore, the two cracks, which bordered each side of the standing center section, would have served as hinges to prevent this.

== Aftermath ==
Map showing the location of the former St. Francis Dam and reservoir north of Santa Clarita between two later, still extant reservoirs – Castaic and Bouquet.

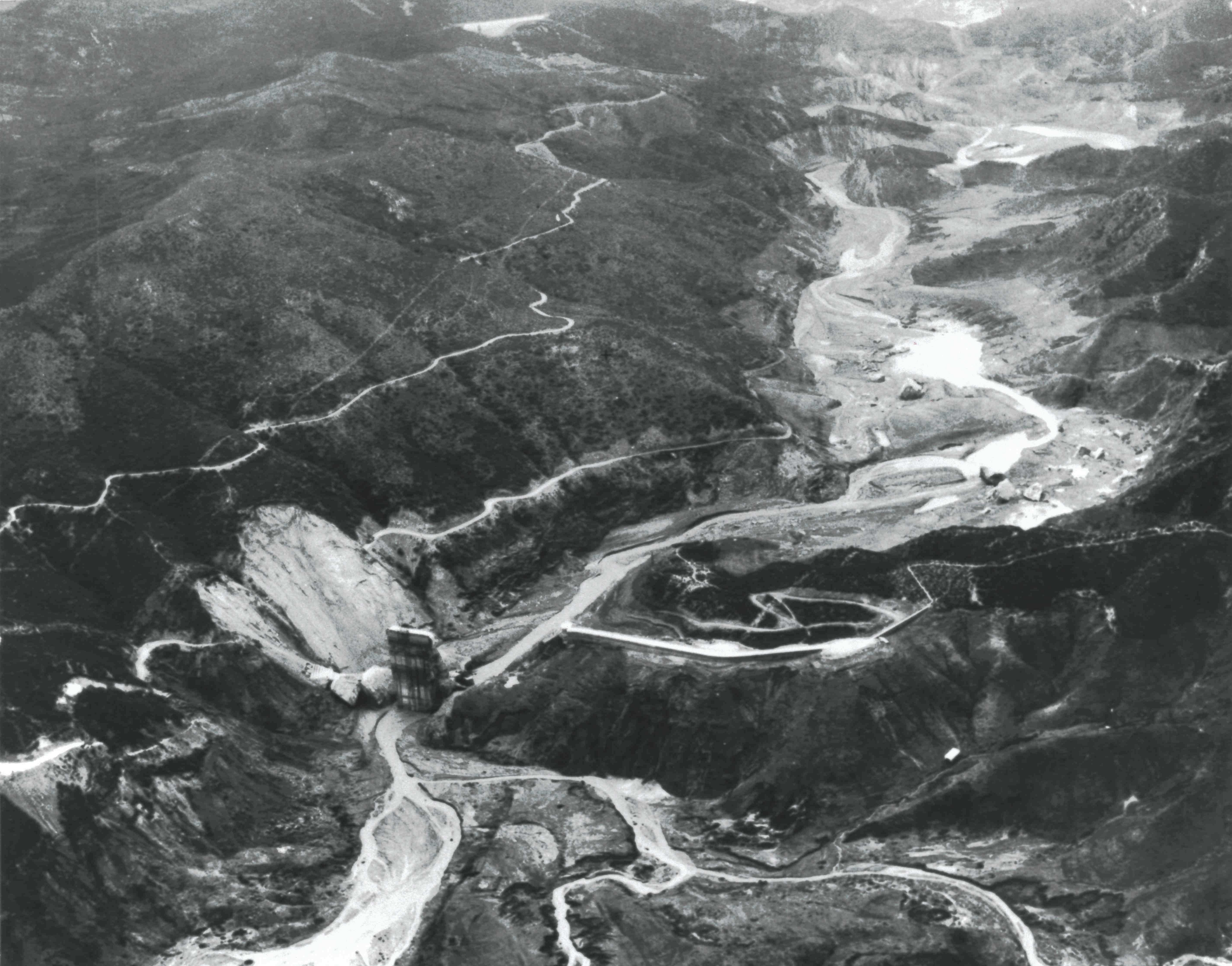
Looking downstream in San Francisquito canyon after dam collapse

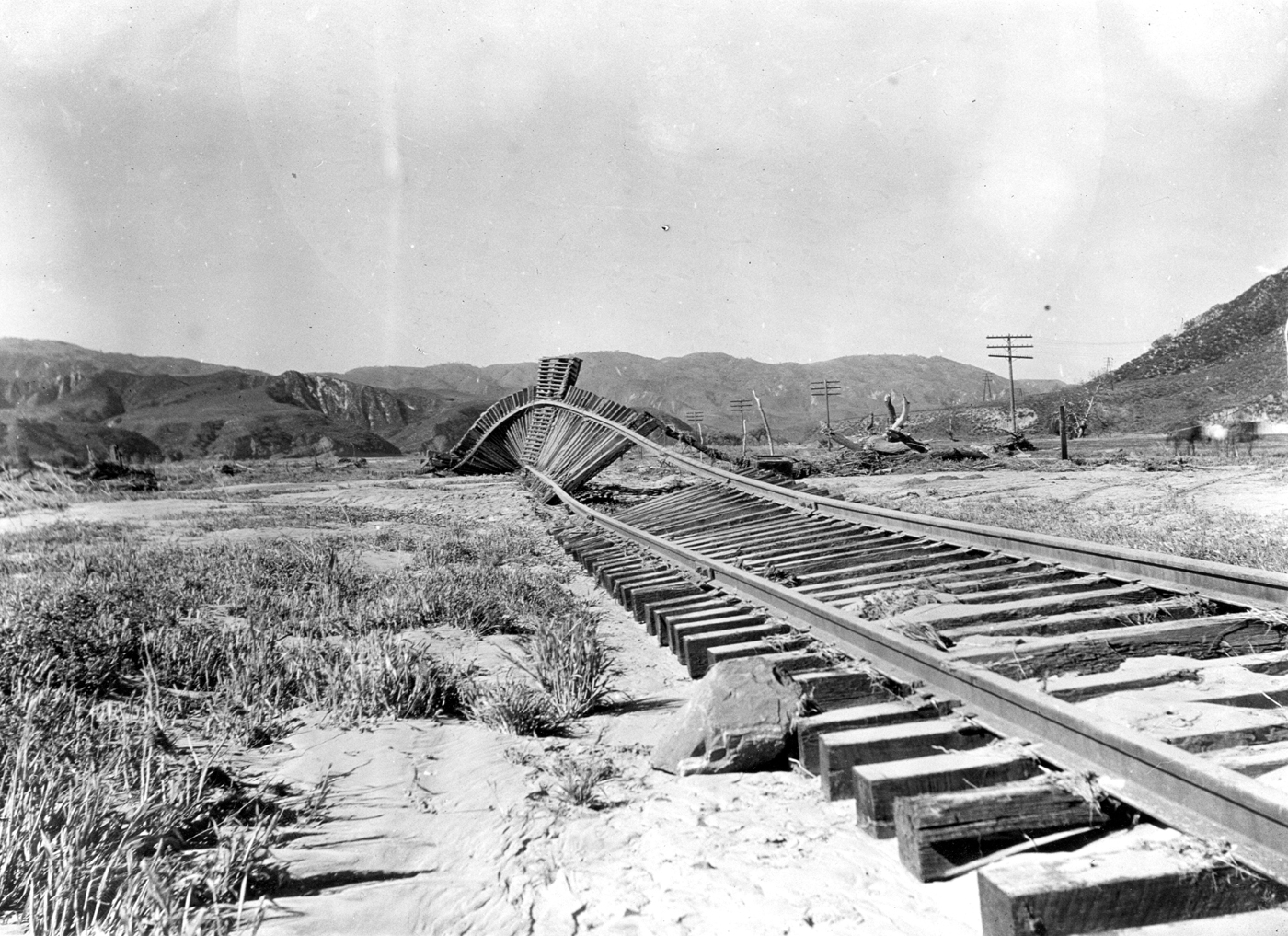
Gnarled railroad tracks of the Santa Paula Branch Line near Piru

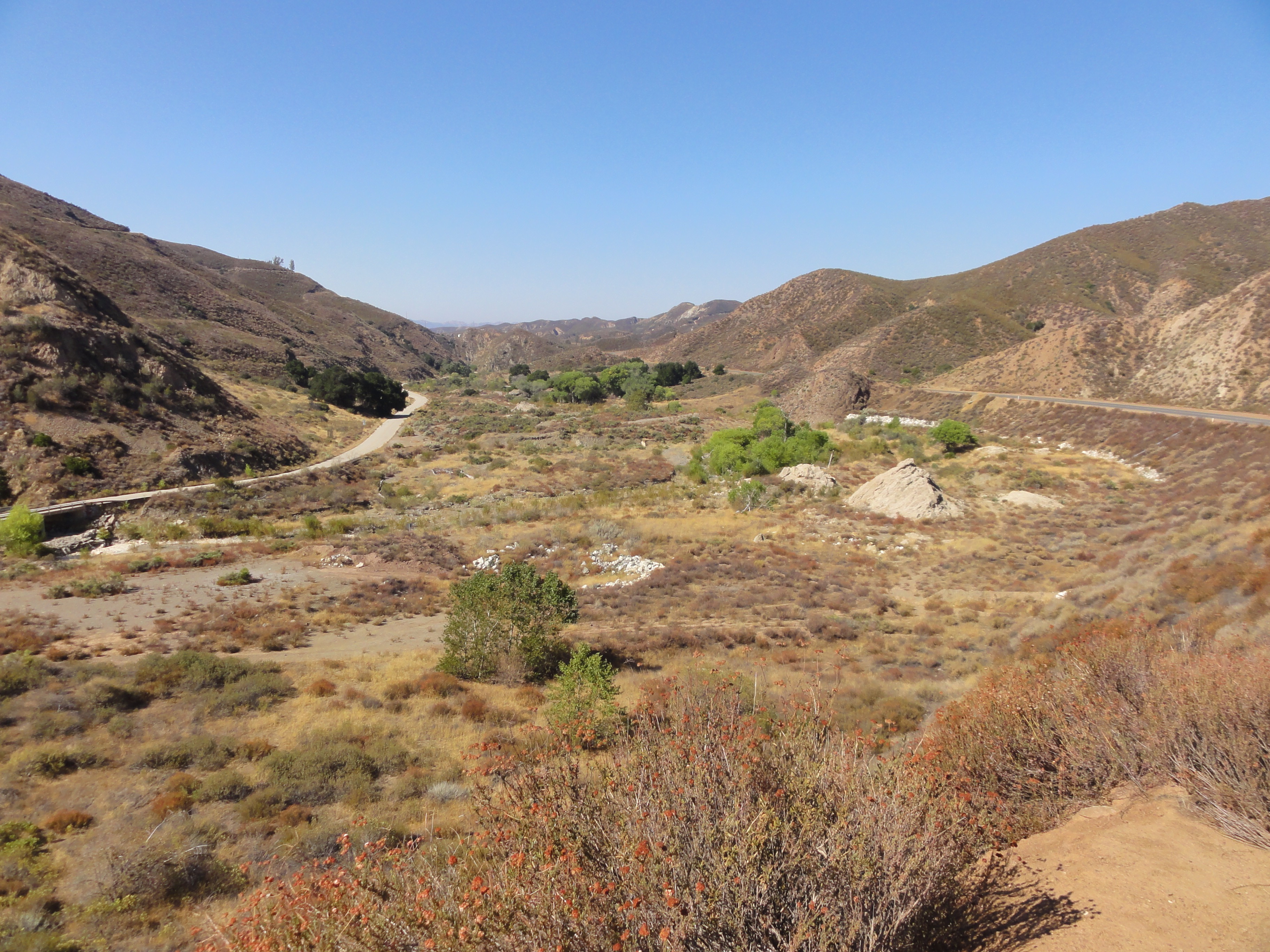
Concrete ruins of the St. Francis Dam remain strewn about San Francisquito Canyon in 2012

The center section of the St. Francis Dam, which had become known as "The Tombstone" due to a newspaper reporter's description of it as such, became an attraction for tourists and souvenir hunters. It was toppled with dynamite in May 1929 after the death of a sightseer there who fell from the block, and the remaining blocks were demolished with bulldozers and jackhammers to discourage exploration of the ruins by the public. The wing dike was used by Los Angeles firemen to gain experience in using explosives on building structures.

The dam was not rebuilt, though Bouquet Reservoir in nearby Bouquet Canyon was built in 1934 as a lower-capacity early replacement, with additional capacity added upon the completion of the Castaic Dam decades later in 1973, which holds nine times the capacity impounded by the St. Francis Dam.

The exact number of victims remains unknown. The official death toll in August 1928 was 385, but the remains of victims continued to be discovered every few years until the mid-1950s. Many victims were swept out to sea when the flood reached the Pacific Ocean and were never recovered, while others were washed ashore, some as far south as the Mexican border. The remains of one victim were found deep underground near Newhall in 1992, and other bodies, believed to be victims of the disaster, were found in the late 1970s and 1994. The death toll is currently estimated to be at least 431.

At the coroner's inquest, the leak that Harnischfeger had spotted was cited as evidence that the dam was leaking on the day of the break, and that both Mulholland and the Bureau of Water Works and Supply were aware of it. Mulholland told the jury he had been at the dam the day of the break due to the dam keeper's call, but neither he nor Van Norman had observed anything of concern, nor found any dangerous conditions. Mulholland further testified that leaks in dams, especially of the type and size of the St. Francis, were common. During the inquest Mulholland said, "This inquest is a very painful thing for me to have to attend but it is the occasion of it that is painful. The only ones I envy about this thing are the ones who are dead." In subsequent testimony, after answering a question he added, "Whether it is good or bad, don't blame anyone else, you just fasten it on me. If there was an error in human judgment, I was the human, I won't try to fasten it on anyone else."

The coroner's inquest jury determined that one of the causative factors for the disaster lay in what they had termed as "an error in engineering judgment in determining the foundation at the St. Francis Dam site and deciding on the best type of dam to build there" and that "the responsibility for the error in engineering judgment rests upon the Bureau of Water Works and Supply, and the Chief Engineer thereof." They cleared Mulholland as well as others of the Bureau of Water Works and Supply of any criminal culpability, since neither he nor anyone else at the time could have known of the instability of the rock formations on which the dam was built. The hearings also recommended that "the construction and operation of a great dam should never be left to the sole judgment of one man, no matter how eminent."

Mulholland retired from the Bureau of Water Works and Supply on December 1, 1928. His assistant, Harvey Van Norman, succeeded him as chief engineer and general manager. Mulholland was retained as chief consulting engineer, with an office, and received a salary of $500 a month (equivalent to $9,400 in 2025). In later years, he retreated into a life of semi-isolation. Mulholland died in 1935 at age 79.

=== Dam safety legislation ===
In response to the St. Francis Dam disaster, the California legislature created an updated dam safety program and eliminated the municipal exemption. Before this was added, a municipality having its own engineering department was completely exempt from regulation.

On August 14, 1929, the Department of Public Works, under the administrative oversight of the state engineer, which was later assumed by the Division of Safety of Dams, was given authority to review all non-federal dams over 25 feet (7.6 m) high or which could hold more than 50 acre-feet (62,000 m^{3}) of water. The new legislation also allowed the state to employ consultants, as they deemed necessary. Additionally, the state was given full authority to supervise the maintenance and operation of all non-federal dams.

=== Licensing of civil engineers ===
Having determined that the unregulated design of construction projects constituted a hazard to the public, the California legislature passed laws to regulate civil engineering and, in 1929, created the state Board of Registration for Civil Engineers (now the Board for Professional Engineers, Land Surveyors, and Geologists).

== Analysis ==
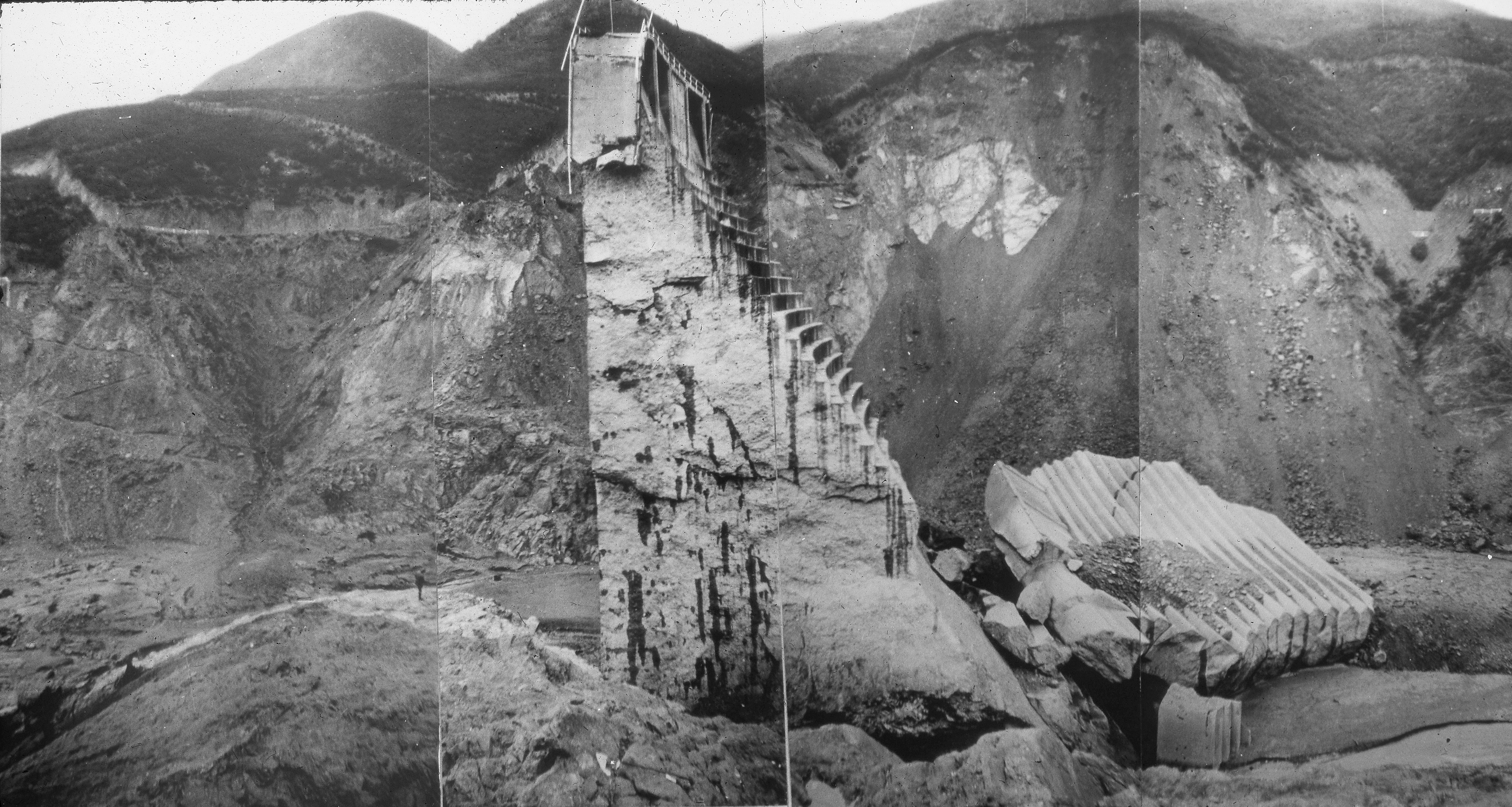
A cross section view of the St Francis Dam after collapse

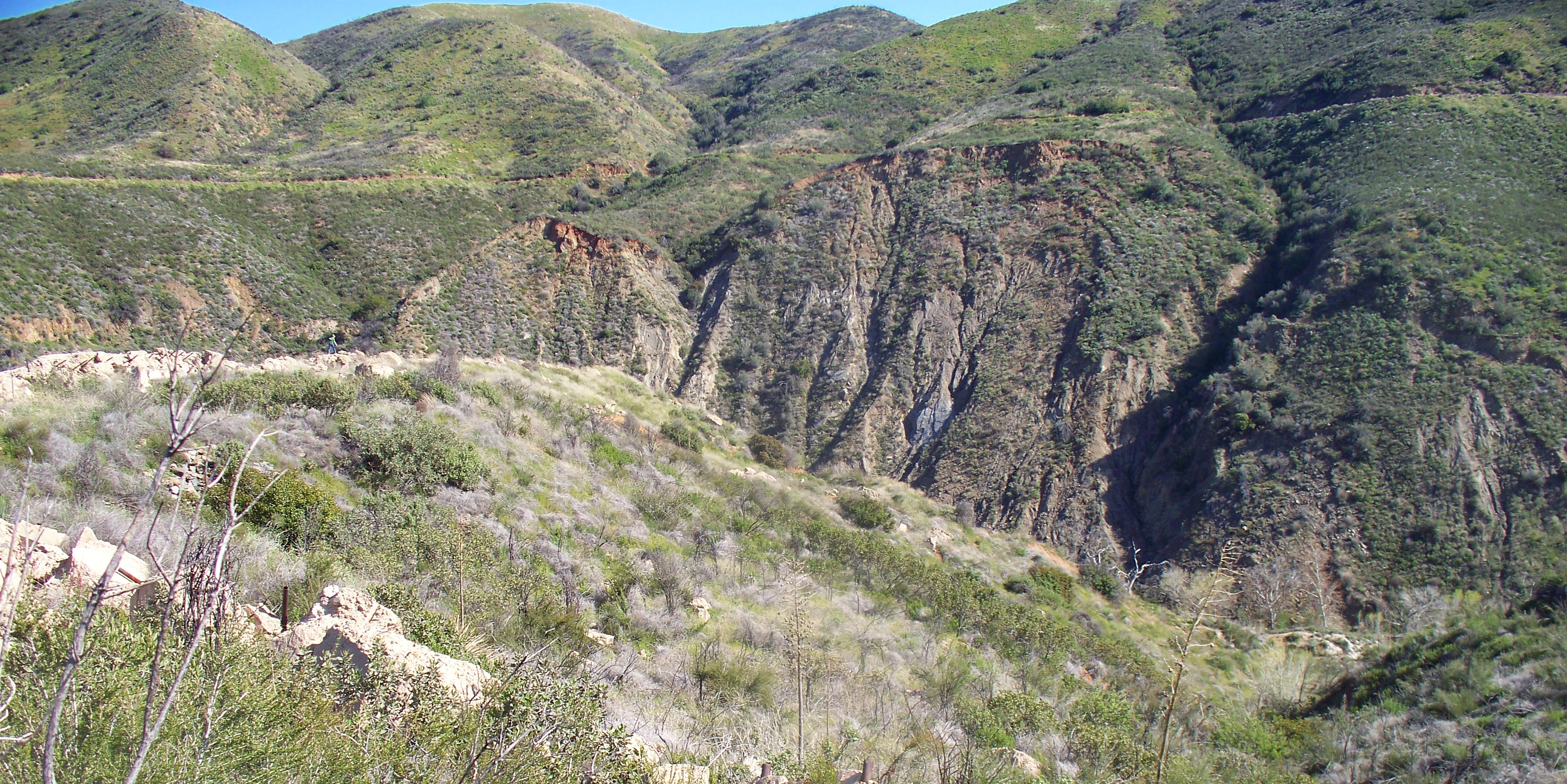
Looking across the canyon at the former dam site in 2009, with outlines of recent and post-collapse landslides visible on the far banks

At present, the popular hypothesis is that collapse may have begun with the eastern abutment of the dam giving way, possibly due to a landslide. This scenario, having its roots in the works of Willis and Grunsky, was expanded upon by the author Charles Outland in his 1963 book Man‑Made Disaster: The Story of St. Francis Dam. The material on which the eastern abutment of the dam had been built may itself have been part of an ancient landslide, but this would have been impossible for almost any geologists of the 1920s to detect. Indeed, the site had been inspected twice, at different times, by two of the leading geologists and civil engineers of the day, Grunsky and John C. Branner of Stanford University; neither found fault with the San Francisquito rock.

J. David Rogers, inspired by the work of Outland, investigated the failure and published an extensive scenario, albeit somewhat controversial, of the possible geological and rock mechanic actions which may have led to the dam's failure. He attributed the failure to three major factors: the instability of the ancient landslide material on which the dam was built, the failure to compensate for the additional height added to the dam's design, and the design and construction being overseen by only one person.

A critique of Rogers' historical analysis of the dam's collapse was published in the journal California History in 2004 by historians Norris Hundley Jr. (Professor Emeritus, UCLA) and Donald C. Jackson (Professor, Lafayette College). While accepting most of his geological analysis of the failure, the article makes clearer the differences and deficiencies of the structure built in San Francisquito Canyon and how it fell short of the standards for large-scale concrete gravity dams as practiced by other prominent dam engineers in the 1920s.

== Mulholland Dam reinforcement ==
Shortly after the disaster, many living below Mulholland Dam, which creates the Hollywood Reservoir, feared a similar disaster and began to protest, petitioning the City of Los Angeles to drain the reservoir and remove the dam. A Committee of Engineers & Geologists to Assess Mulholland Dam was appointed to evaluate the dam's safety. An external review panel to evaluate the structure, convened by the State of California, followed in 1930. The same year, the City of Los Angeles Board of Water & Power Commissioners appointed their own Board of Review for the dam. Although the state's panel did not recommend modification of the dam, both panels came to similar conclusions: that the dam lacked what was then considered sufficient uplift relief, which could lead to destabilization, and was unacceptable. Again in 1931, a fourth panel, the Board of Engineers to Evaluate Mulholland Dam, was appointed to assess the structure. As well, an external study group appointed by the Board of Water & Power Commissioners produced a "Geological Report of the Suitability of Foundations". Certain design deficiencies were uncovered in the plans made by the engineering department during the planning phase of the dam. These had to do with the dam's base width in conjunction to its ability to resist uplift and sliding and to withstand earthquake loading.

The decision was made to permanently keep the Hollywood Reservoir drawn down. It was also decided to keep the amount stored in the reservoir to no more than 4,000 acre⋅ft (4,900,000 m^{3}) and to place an enormous amount of earth, 330,000 cu yd (250,000 m^{3}), on the dam's downstream face to increase its resistance against hydraulic uplift and earthquake forces, and to screen it from public view. This work was carried out in 1933 and 1934.

== Legacy ==
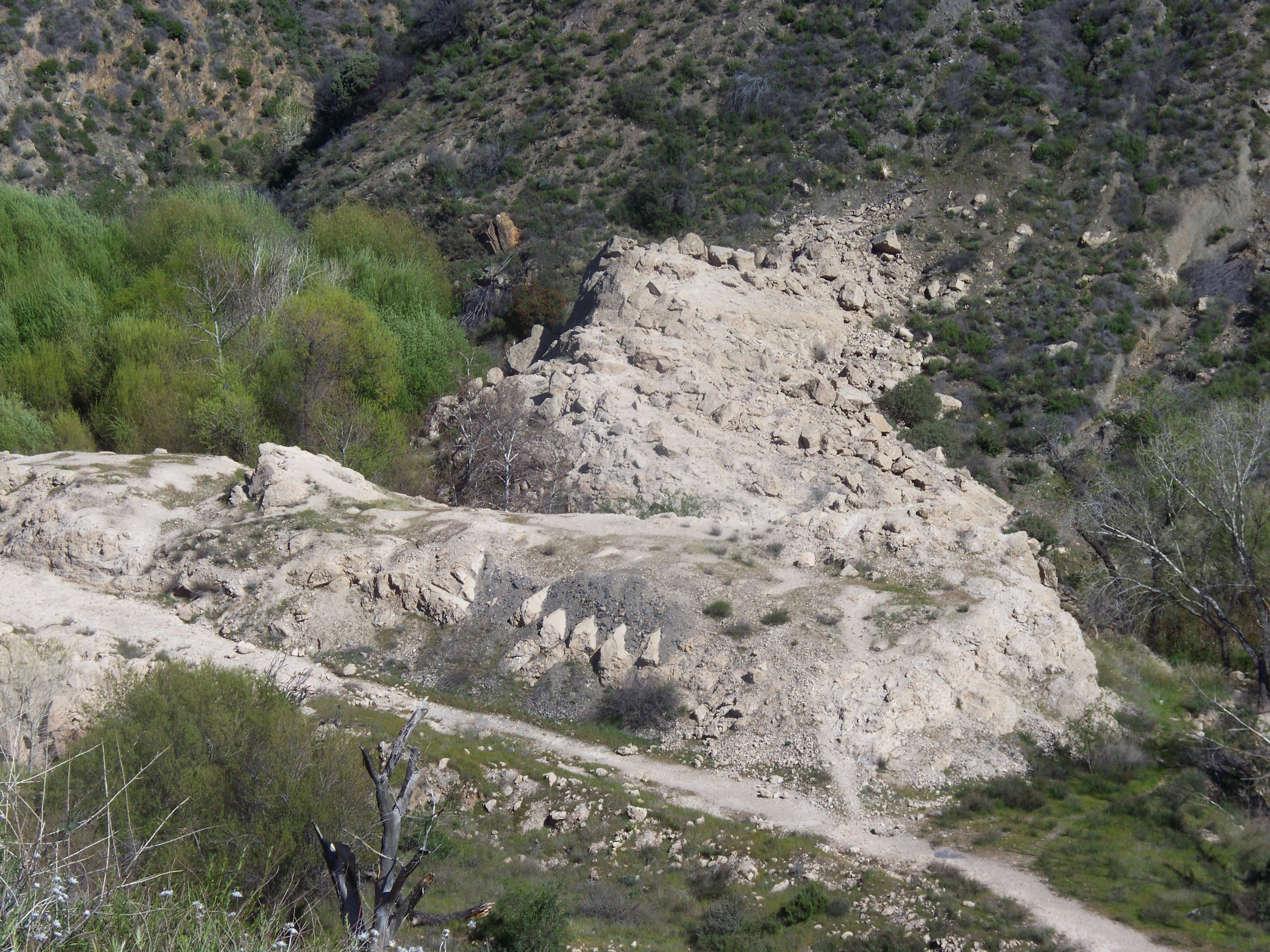
Remains of the "Tombstone" section of the dam in 2009. The partially buried edges of the stair-stepped face of the dam are visible.

The only visible remains of the St. Francis Dam are weathered, broken chunks of gray concrete and the rusted remnants of the handrails that lined the top of the dam and the wing dike. The ruins and the scar from the ancient landslide can be seen from San Francisquito Canyon Road. Large chunks of debris can still be found scattered about the creek bed south of the dam's original site.

The site of the disaster is registered as California Historical Landmark #919. The landmark is located on the grounds of Powerhouse No. 2 and is near San Francisquito Canyon Road. The marker reads:

NO. 919 ST. FRANCIS DAM DISASTER SITE – The 185-foot concrete St. Francis Dam, part of the Los Angeles aqueduct system, stood a mile and a half north of this spot. On March 12, 1928, just before midnight, it collapsed and sent over twelve billion gallons of water roaring down the valley of the Santa Clara River. Over 450 lives were lost in this, one of California's greatest disasters.

San Francisquito Canyon Road sustained heavy storm damage in 2005, and when rebuilt in 2009 it was re-routed away from the original roadbed and the remains of the main section of the dam. The new road is routed through a cut which was made in the hillside on the western edge of the wing dike.

=== National Monument and National Memorial ===
The John D. Dingell Jr. Conservation, Management, and Recreation Act, signed March 12, 2019, established the Saint Francis Dam Disaster National Monument and authorized the establishment of the Saint Francis Dam Disaster National Memorial. The sites will be administered by the United States Forest Service within Angeles National Forest to commemorate the collapse of the dam and preserve 353 acres (143 ha) of land for recreation and protection of resources. Access to the Monument will be by foot via Old San Francisquito Canyon Road.

The St. Francis Dam National Memorial Foundation is a non-profit organization, established in 2019, with the goal of raising funds to support the United States Forest Service in building and maintaining the St. Francis Dam Disaster National Memorial and Monument, including the construction of a visitor center and a memorial wall with the names of all the identified victims. A winning memorial design was announced in April 2023.

== Documentaries ==
The rise of Mulholland, Los Angeles' water issues, and the collapse of the dam are dealt with in the 2018 documentary film, Forgotten Tragedy: The Story of The St Francis Dam, by Jesse Cash.

The story of the dam's construction and catastrophic failure is also the subject of the documentary Flood in the Desert, which was first broadcast in May 2022 as part of the American Experience series on PBS.

== In popular culture ==
- Numerous fictionalized references are made to Mulholland, the California water wars, the aqueduct and the St. Francis Dam disaster in the 1974 movie Chinatown.
- Rock musician Frank Black makes several references to the St. Francis Dam disaster in his songs "St. Francis Dam Disaster" and "Olé Mulholland."
- The 2014 young adult novel 100 Sideways Miles by Andrew A. Smith features the current site of the dam disaster as well as some discussion of the historical event.
- The 2015 folk song "Lucy on the Line" by Tim Griffin and Maya Bohnhoff commemorates the brave "Hello Girl" telephone operators who, at risk to their lives, kept calling residents down the flood path, warning them to evacuate.

== See also ==
- List of national memorials of the United States
- List of national monuments of the United States
- List of dams and reservoirs in California
- Baldwin Hills Reservoir
- Malpasset Dam
- Johnstown Flood
