= Hollywood Reservoir =

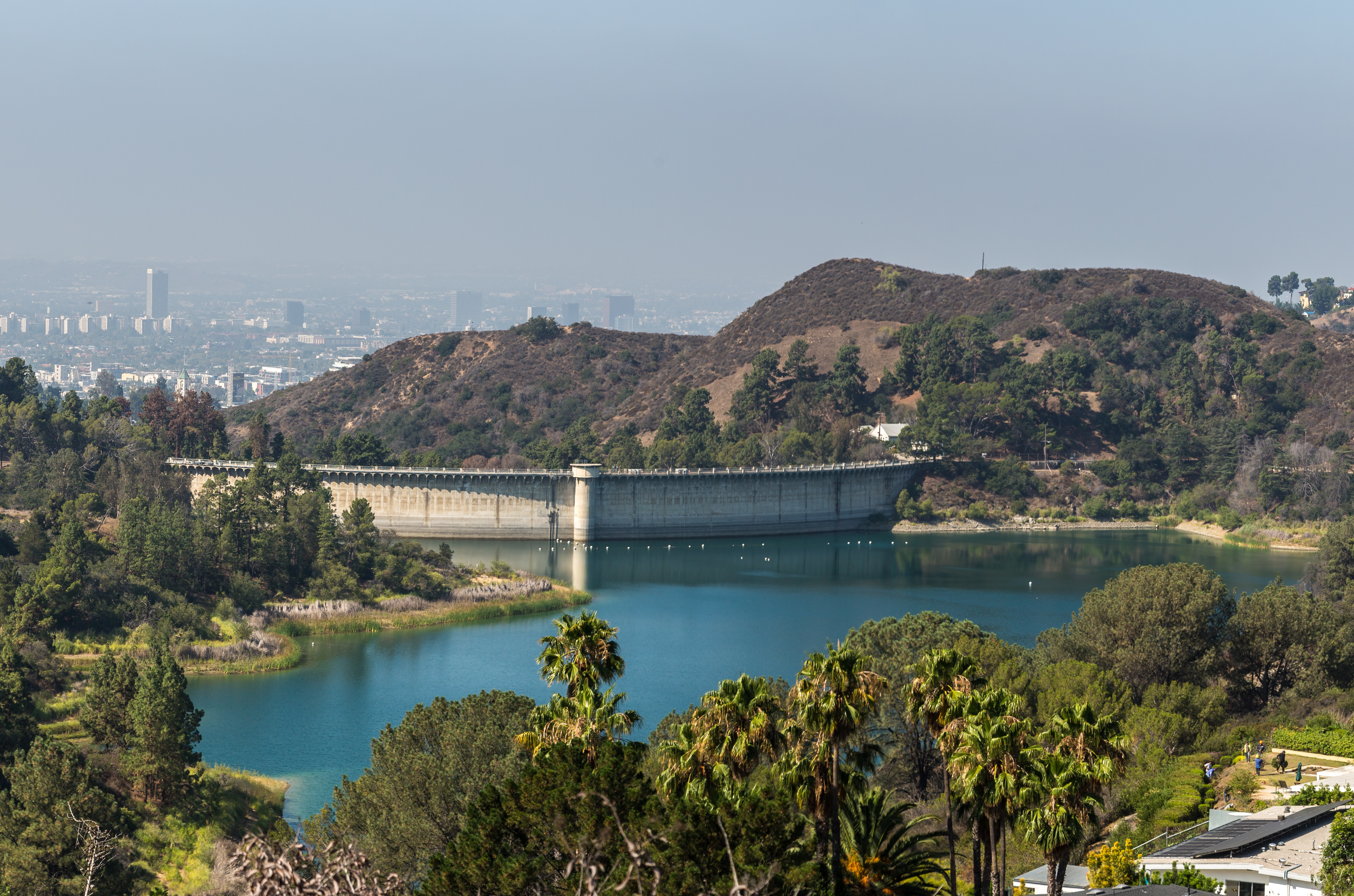
- Hollywood Reservoir behind Mulholland Dam (2015)

- Location within the Los Angeles metropolitan area Location within California Location within the United States
- Location: Hollywood Hills, Santa Monica Mountains, California, United States
- Coordinates: 34°07′04″N 118°19′52″W
- Type: Reservoir
- Max. depth: 183 feet (56 m)
- Water volume: 2.5 billion US gallons (9,500,000 m^{3})

Hollywood Reservoir (also known as Lake Hollywood) is a reservoir located in the Hollywood Hills, situated in the Santa Monica Mountains and north of the Hollywood neighborhood of Los Angeles, California. It is maintained by the Los Angeles Department of Water and Power (LADWP). The reservoir and surrounding neighborhood lie east of the Hollywood Freeway and are overlooked, from a distance, by the Hollywood Sign.

The reservoir was created by the Mulholland Dam (built in 1924), designed by the LADWP – then named the Bureau of Water Works and Supply – as part of the city's water storage and supply system. Visitors will notice the dam features decorative bear-head medallions, attached to the spandrel walls along the downstream side of the structure. The bear heads, in addition to representing the California state symbol, demonstrate the city's 1920s emphasis on making this urban waterworks both functional and civic in appearance.

The Hollywood Reservoir has appeared in films such as Earthquake (1974). The gated entrance to the reservoir is briefly seen in the opening scene of John Carpenter's Halloween (1978). The reservoir is featured in Visiting... with Huell Howser Episode 915. and the Season 4 opening of the TV Series 9-1-1.

== Geography ==
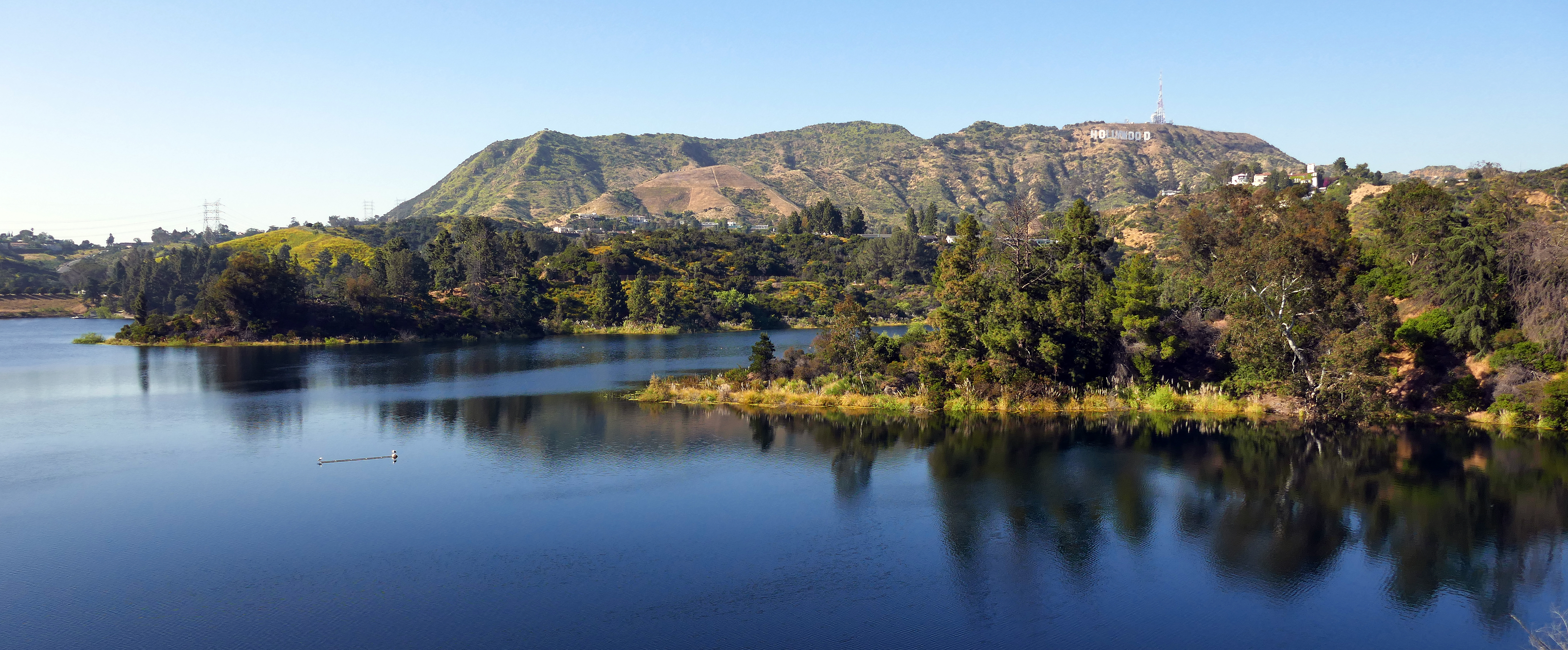
Hollywood Reservoir, a source of drinking water for the city of Los Angeles, California.

The reservoir has a capacity of 7,900 acre-feet, which is 2.5 billion US gallons (9,500,000 m^{3}) and a maximum water depth of 183 feet (56 m). During its first years in service the reservoir level varied, though for most of the time it was kept at a high level and was filled on several occasions.

Within days after the collapse of the St. Francis Dam in March 1928, William Mulholland ordered the Hollywood Reservoir lowered due, in part, to public fears of a repeat disaster. Shortly after the disaster and in the years following, several engineering panels met to discuss the safety of the dam. These panels of engineers, from both the state and the LADWP came to differing conclusions. In 1931, the LADWP made the decision to permanently keep the Hollywood Reservoir lowered, and keep it to no more than 4,000 acre-feet (4,900,000 m^{3}). The reservoir now is usually maintained at about 2,800 acre-feet (3,500,000 m^{3}).

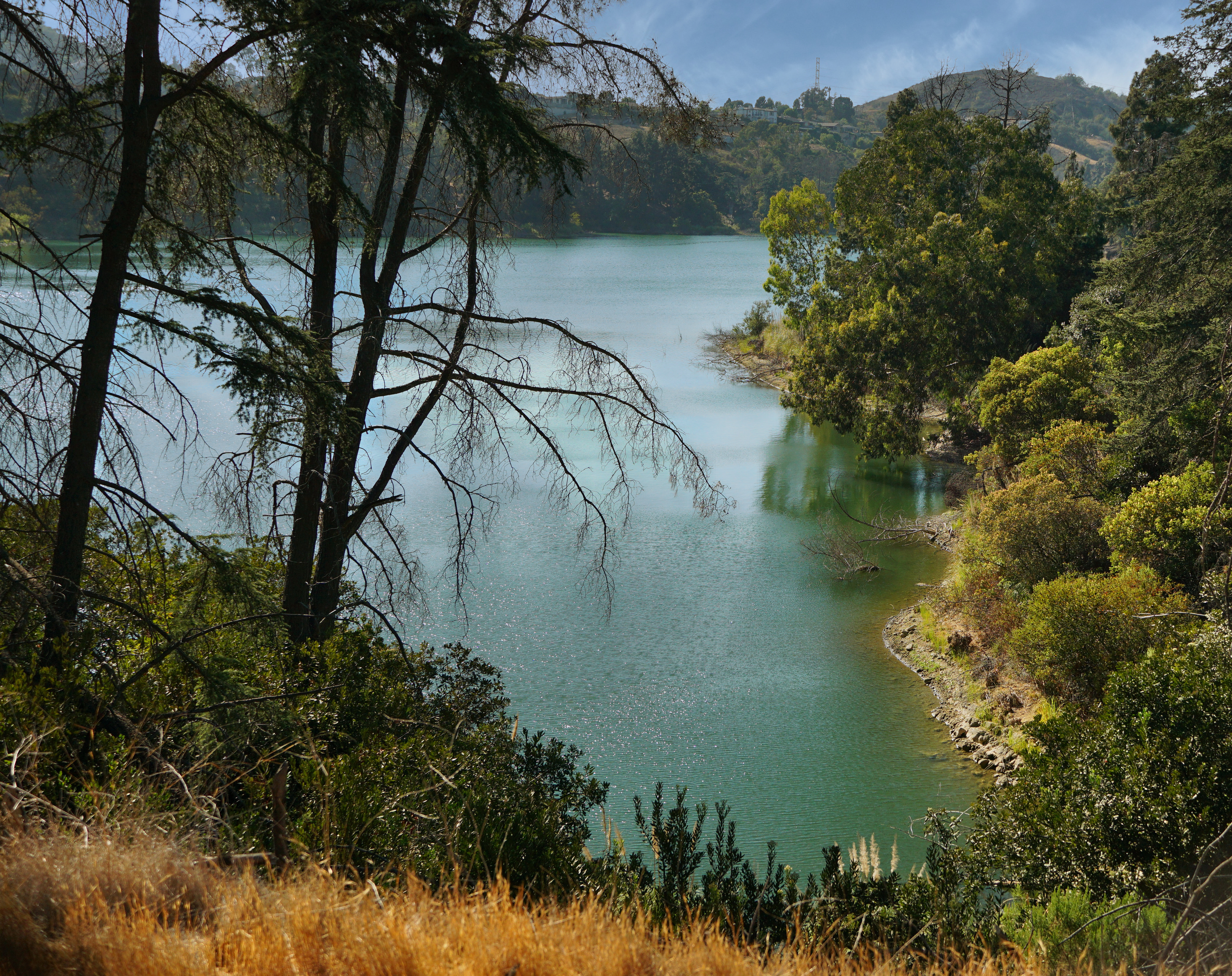
View from hiking road

The surrounding recreational area is known as Lake Hollywood Park, and is open for walking, hiking, and jogging. The reservoir is encircled by a flat, paved road that is suitable for walking and bicycling. The loop on Lake Hollywood Walking Trail is 3.5 miles (5.6 km) long and crosses Mulholland Dam.

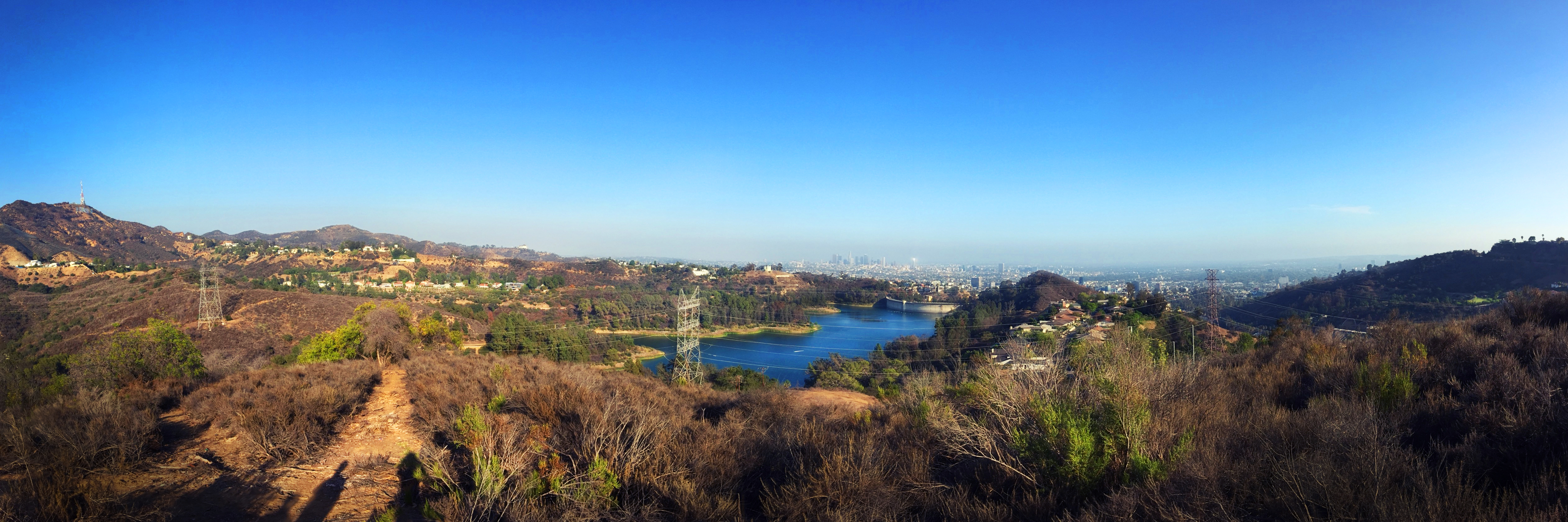
The Hollywood Reservoir and the Mulholland Dam, with the Hollywood Sign in the distance to the left (2015)

== See also ==
- List of lakes in California
