= Beverly Hills Register of Historic Properties =

Properties register in California, US

The Beverly Hills Register of Historic Properties consists of properties designated as historic landmarks by the Cultural Heritage Commission of City of Beverly Hills, California, United States. To date, 45 buildings, parks, and public art installations have been designated. The designated landmarks include works of master architects (including Frank Lloyd Wright, Richard Neutra, Greene and Greene, and Paul R. Williams), homes of major figures in the motion picture business (including Samuel Goldwyn, David O. Selznick, and Harry Cohn), a storybook witch's cottage originally built as a movie set, and a space-age gas station.

== Adoption of historic preservation program ==
In 2011, the owner of the Richard Neutra-designed Kronish House, regarded as a "Modern masterpiece," began demolition proceedings. The proposed demolition sparked a public outcry.

In 2012, following the threat to the Kronish House, the Beverly Hills city council adopted a historic preservation ordinance. The ordinance seeks "to honor, protect, and preserve the most exceptional properties in Beverly Hills."

== Properties designated ==
As of 2025, a total of 45 properties have received local landmark status pursuant to the ordinance. The first property to receive the designation was the Beverly Hills Hotel, designed by Elmer Grey and completed in 1912 before Beverly Hills was incorporated as a city. The most recent addition to the registry was the Mission Revival Church of the Good Shepherd that has been the site of numerous celebrity weddings (Elizabeth Taylor, Carmen Miranda, Mark Wahlberg) and funerals (Rudolph Valentino, Gary Cooper, Alfred Hitchcock, Frank Sinatra).

The register includes works by several master architects, including Frank Lloyd Wright (Anderton Court), Richard Neutra (Kronish House), Greene and Greene (Anthony-Kerry House), Paul R. Williams (MCA/Litton Headquarters Complex), Gordon Kaufmann (Greystone Mansion, The Helms Estate), S. Charles Lee (Saban Theatre), and Lloyd Wright (Karasik House).

The register also includes homes of several individuals notable for their contributions to the motion picture business, including producers and studio executives Samuel Goldwyn and David O. Selznick, Columbia Pictures co-founder Harry Cohn, and comedian/actor Joe E. Brown.

Other entries on the register include a storybook witch's cottage originally built as a movie set in Culver City and moved to Beverly Hills in 1924; a space-age gas station built in 1965; and a statue depicting unraveled celluloid.

== Downgrading of the program ==
In 2014, the Los Angeles Conservancy gave the city an A+ rating for its nascent historic preservation program. However, the program drew ire from developers and property owners, and in 2015, the city council amended the ordinance, significantly weakening its protections. In response to the changes, the Los Angeles Conservancy changed the city's preservation report card from a grade of A+ to C−.

While 42 properties were designated in the first seven years of the program from 2012 to 2018, only three were designated in the following seven years from 2019 to 2025.

== List of landmarks ==
Numbers shaded in blue indicate properties also listed on the National Register of Historic Places.

No.	Name	Image	Address	Architect	Year	Report
1	Beverly Hills Hotel		9641 Sunset Blvd	Elmer Grey; Paul R. Williams	1912	
2	Virginia Robinson Estate and Garden		1008 Elden Way	Nathaniel Dryden	1910	
3	Beverly Hills Women's Club		1700 Chevy Chase Dr	Gable and Wyant	1925	
4	Greystone Mansion		905 Loma Vista Dr	Gordon Kaufmann	1927	
5	Beverly Hills Post Office		469 N. Crescent Dr	Ralph Carlin Flewelling	1933	
6	Anderton Court Shops		332 N. Rodeo Dr	Frank Lloyd Wright	1954	
7	Karasik House		436 Spalding Dr	Lloyd Wright	1960	
8	The Witch's House		516 N. Walden Dr	Harry Oliver	1920	
9	Waverly Mansion		9401 Sunset Blvd	Leland F. Fuller	1925	
10	Hilton Office Building		9990 Santa Monica Blvd	William Pereira and Associates	1955	
11	Locke House		801 N. Rodeo Drive	Frank M. Tyler	1914	
12	Beverly Hills City Hall		450 N. Crescent Dr	Koerner and Gage	1932	
13	Saban Theatre		8440 Wilshire Blvd	S. Charles Lee	1930	
14	Anthony-Kerry House		910 N. Bedford Dr	Greene and Greene	1909, 1923	
15	Millard Sheets Artwork Installation		450 N. Rexford Dr	Millard Sheets	1974	
16	McGilvray House		801 N. Alpine Dr	Wallace Neff	1927	
17	Harry Cohn Estate		1000 N. Crescent Dr	Robert Farquhar	1927	
18	Beverly Wilshire Hotel		9528 Wilshire Blvd	Walker and Eisen	1928	
19	Slavin House		620 N. Sierra Dr	Marshall P. Wilkinson	1936	
20	Beverly Gardens Park		Santa Monica Blvd & Wilshire Blvd	Wilbur Cook Jr. and Ralph Cornell	1906, 1930	
21	Beverly Hills Water Treatment Number 1		325-333 S. La Cienega Blvd	Arthur Taylor	1920	
22	The Helms Estate		135 Copley Place	Gordon Kaufmann	1928	
23	Beverly Gardens Apartments		9379-9383 W. Olympic Blvd	C.W. Raymond	1930	
24	Writers and Artists Building		9507 Santa Monica Blvd	Roy Seldon Price	1924	
25	Joe E. Brown Residence		707 Walden Dr	Rene Riverre	1930	
26	Ahmanson Bank and Trust Building		9145 Wilshire Blvd	Millard Sheets	1959	
27	Will Rogers Memorial Park		9650 Sunset Blvd	Wilbur Cook	1915	
28	Kronish House		9439 Sunset Blvd	Richard Neutra	1954	
29	Celluloid Monument		Triangular median at intersection of Olympic, Beverly, Beverwil Drives	Merell Gage	1960	
30	Gibraltar Square - Kate Mantilini Building		9101-9111 Wilshire Blvd	William Pereira and Associates	1959, 1986	
31	Clock Drive-In Market		8423 Wilshire Blvd	na	1929	
32	Rosenstiel Residence		1210 Coldwater Canyon	Victor Gruen	1950	
33	Salkin Apartment Building No. 2		328 S. Rexford Dr	Jules G. Salkin	1956	
34	Samuel Goldwyn Estate		1200 Laurel Lane	Douglas Honnold	1934	
35	Fine Arts Ahrya Theatre		8554 Wilshire Blvd	B. Marcus Priteca	1937	
36	Vance Residence		805 Hillcrest Rd.	John Elgin Woolf	1954	
37	Union 76 Service Station		427 N. Crescent Dr.	Gin Dan Wong	1965	
38	Weller-Schreiber Apartment Building		157 S. Crescent Dr.	A. Markowitz and Son	1935	
39	Gindi-Birnkrant House		604 Alpine Dr	Buff and Hensman	1979	
40	J.B. Hurd Residence		626 N. Camden Dr	Ray P. Stahmann	1941	
41	Wilshire-Rexford Office Building		9300 Wilshire Blvd	Sidney Eisenshtat	1963	
42	David O. Selznick Residence		1050 Summit Dr	Roland Coate	1935	
43	Pendleton-Evans Residence		1033 Woodland Dr	John Elgin Woolf	1941	
44	MCA/Litton Headquarters Complex		360-375 N. Crescent Dr	Paul R. Williams	1938 - 1969	
45	Church of the Good Shepherd		501-505 N. Bedford Dr	James Donnellan	1924	
