= Storybook architecture =

Residential building style popular 1920s and 1930s

Harry Oliver's Spadena House (1921), also known as the Witch's House, Beverly Hills, California.

Storybook architecture or fairytale architecture is a style popularized in the 1920s in England and the United States. Houses built in this style are often referred to as storybook houses.

== Description ==
The storybook style is a nod toward Hollywood design technically called Provincial Revivalism and more commonly called Fairy Tale or Hansel and Gretel. While there is no specific definition of what makes a house storybook style, the main factor may be a sense of playfulness and whimsy. Most seemed snapped out of a craggy old-world village with intentionally uneven roofs, many cobblestone, doors and windows which may look mismatched and odd-shaped. The steep roofs of such buildings often have uneven shingles designed to evoke straw thatch, with multiple gables, turrets and dovecotes.

The style took a foothold in California, particularly in Los Angeles, during the 1920s and 1930s. A primary example can be found in the 1927 Montclair, Oakland, firehouse, and in a more traditional English cottage-style in the 1930 Montclair branch library. Idora Park in north Oakland, California, is a four-square-block storybook architecture development begun in 1927 on the grounds of the old amusement park. Other examples in Los Angeles are the Snow White Cottages, designed in 1931 by architect Ben Sherwood; Charlie Chaplin Studios, built in 1919 by architects Meyer & Holler; the Charlie Chaplin Cottages, built in 1923 by Arthur and Nina Zwebell, a husband-and-wife architectural team; and the "Hobbit House" built between 1940 and 1970 by Disney artist Lawrence Joseph.

The term storybook style was coined by photographer Douglas Keister and writer Arrol Gellner when they published their book Storybook Style in 2001 then did a major revision in 2017.

== Architects and examples ==
The primary architects that worked in this style are Harry Oliver, Ben Sherwood, William R. Yelland, Walter W. Dixon, Hugh W. Comstock, and Carr Jones among many other local architects.

=== Los Angeles area ===
A dovecote is a small, decorative shelter for pigeons often built on top of a house. It looks like a receptacle for secret messages from a fairy-tale world, and this whimsy makes up for the fact that no one actually wants pigeons roosting on their house. Dovecotes are especially common in certain parts of the Los Angeles suburbs, on ‘‘storybook ranch’’ homes — houses recast on the exterior to resemble a cottage that one of the Seven Dwarves might live in... as an intern at a historic preservation firm in Sherman Oaks, I was assigned the task of documenting every dovecote within 10 blocks of the office.

Oliver is noted for his Spadena House in Beverly Hills, and the Tam O'Shanter Inn in Atwater Village, Los Angeles. Harry Oliver worked on more than 30 Hollywood films as an art director or set decorator between 1919 and 1938. The Spadena House, also known as the Witch's House, was originally built to function as offices and dressing rooms for Willat Studios, a silent film studio in Culver City. It was moved to Beverly Hills in either 1926 or 1934 (accounts vary) and has served as a private residence since that time. The Tam O'Shanter Inn, also a Storybook building, was designed by Oliver and built in 1922. Harry Oliver was also responsible for Van de Kamp bakery's trademark windmill buildings which were designed during the same time period.

Sherwood is noted for the Snow White Cottages built in 1931 in Los Angeles. Beachwood Canyon is also known for its storybook styled homes, including Castillo del Lago and Wolf's Lair.

Another example are cupola-topped storybook homes in a lot in Culver City constructed between 1946 and 1970. They are collectively known as the Hobbit Houses.

=== San Francisco Bay area ===
William Yelland is noted for his (Thornburg) Normandy Village and Tupper & Reed Music Store, both located in Berkeley. Yelland designed homes in Oakland, Piedmont, Berkeley, San Leandro, Hayward, Woodland, Modesto, Clarksburg, Sacramento, Kensington and San Francisco.

W. W. Dixon is noted for his work with developer R. C. Hillen in creating the Dixon & Hillen catalog of home plans. Dixon is noted for Stonehenge & Stoneleigh villages in Alameda as well as Picardy Drive in Oakland.

Carr Jones is noted for the post office (now Postino Restaurant) in Lafayette. He also designed and built one-of-a-kind homes in Oakland, Berkeley and Piedmont such as the impressive Houvenin House at 85 Wildwood Gardens in Piedmont. He also built the Steve Jobs home in Palo Alto.

=== Iowa ===
In Iowa City, Iowa, builder Howard Moffitt constructed more than 100 vernacular houses, known locally as Moffitt houses, in the 1930s. These houses are strongly influenced by Storybook styling, often faced with whimsical faux Medieval flourishes.

=== Illinois ===
In Streator, Illinois, the Weber House and Garden is a 1937 Tudor-style house that has been described as a “storybook” home, set within an English-style garden developed by owner Ted Weber. A regional travel feature notes Weber began renovating the childhood home in 1983.

=== Arizona ===
In Tucson, Arizona, self taught Storybook style disabled architect and builder George Phar Legler along with local friends and railroad hobos began in 1923 constructing on 3 acres numerous storybook themed rock, wire, and cement structures, features, and water features based on their near to the ground view of being seen from the eyes of children. Known locally and at times nationally as Valley of the Moon (Tucson, Arizona). Building at the Valley of the Moon continued until 1963. The original magical features that remain include the Wizard's Tower, Cathedral Church Complex, Enchanted Garden, along with a few others. The facility is on the National Register of Historic Places and remains open to the public operated and conserved by the George Phar Legler Society, Inc.

== Gallery ==
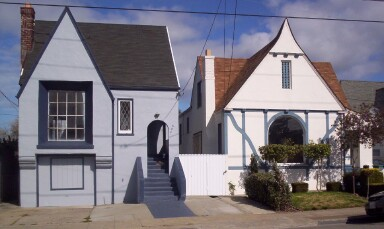
Storybook houses in Oakland, California

Hugh W. Comstock's The Tuck Box storybook house in Carmel-by-the-Sea, Monterey, California

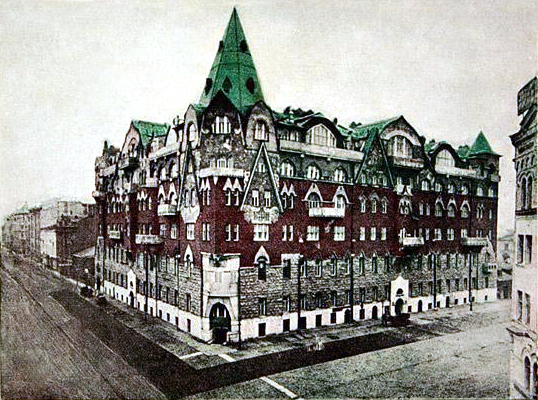
Fairy-Tale House (1906–1942), St Petersburg, Russia

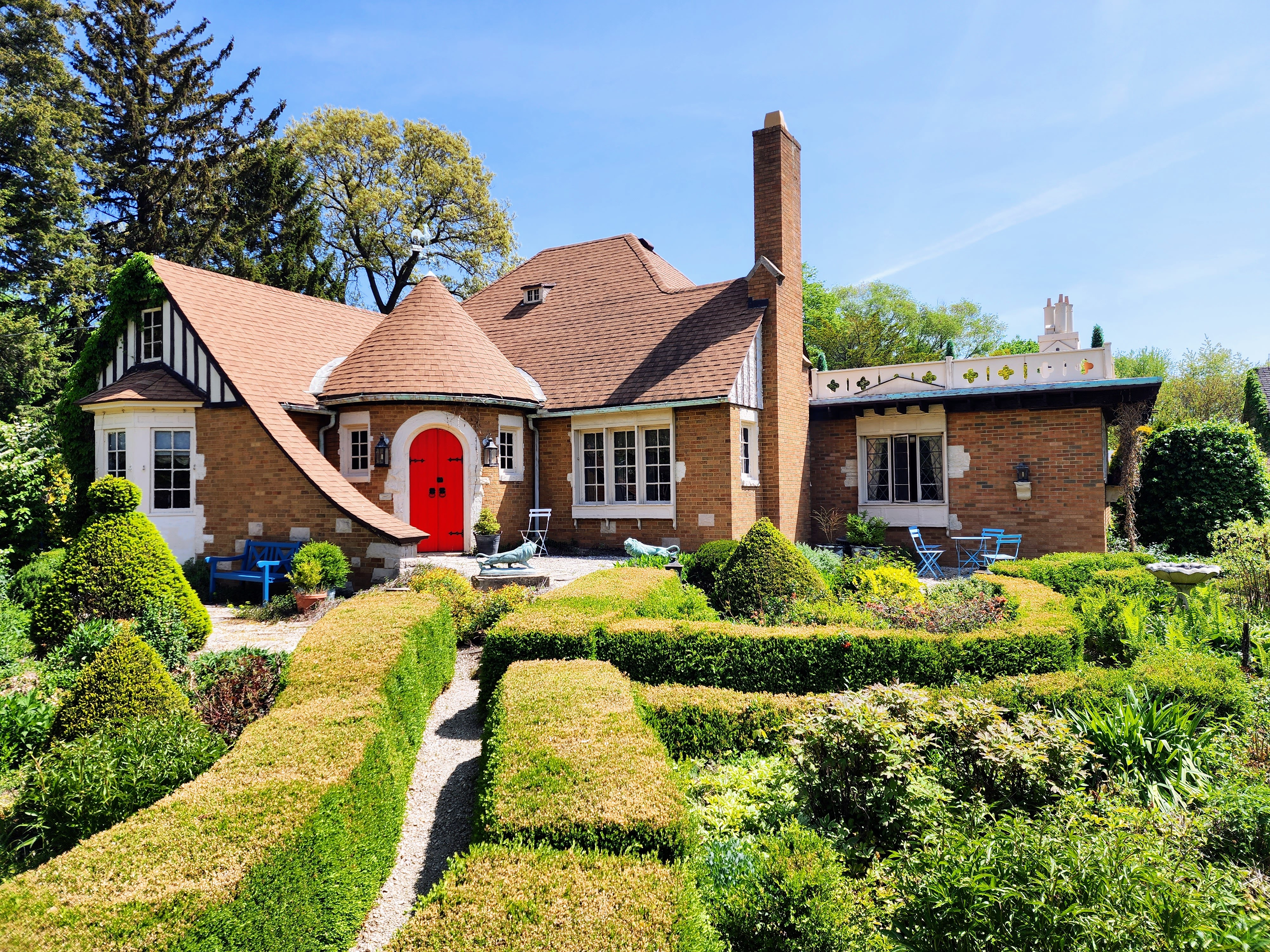
Storybook house example located in Streator, IL - Known as Weber House and Garden

== See also ==
- Blaise Hamlet
- Earl Young (architect)
- Harold G. Stoner
