= Witch house (disambiguation) =

Witch house is an electronic music subgenre.

Witch house may also refer to:

== Arts and entertainment ==
- Witch House, a 1945 novel by Evangeline Walton
- Witch House, an EP by Acid Witch
- The Witch House (film), or The House of Ghosts, a 1906 French film
- The Witch's House, a 2012 video game

== Buildings ==
- The Witch House, a historic house in Salem, Massachusetts, associated with the 1692 witch trials
- Spadena House, a storybook house in Beverly Hills, California, also known as the "Witch's House"
