= Harold G. Stoner =

English-born American architect (1890–1971)

- Born: 1890; Brighton, England
- Died: 1971 (aged 80–81)
- Occupation: Architect

Harold G. Stoner (1890–1971) was an English-born American architect who worked Art Deco and revival styles in San Francisco's west of Twin Peaks district.

== Biography ==
Born in Brighton, England, he left for Regina, Canada, to pursue a career in architecture. After working for the provincial government and completing his advanced education, he obtained an apprenticeship in 1913 with the notable architectural firm led by F. Chapman Clemesha and Frank H. Portnall. Two years later, Stoner arrived in the San Francisco Bay area and began working for architect Charles McCall in Oakland. As Stoner's career progressed, he worked as the chief architect for Lang Brothers Realty.

Stoner worked in a variety of Revival and fantasy styles, such as Storybook architecture, as well as Art Deco. He also collaborated with landscape architect Thomas Church. In addition to many homes west of Twin Peaks and elsewhere in the Bay Area, Stoner designed the Carolands Gatehouse, the "Tropic Beach" façade of the Sutro Baths and the building that housed Sally Rand's Nude Ranch at the 1939 Golden Gate International Exhibition on Treasure Island. Stoner designed four San Francisco Chronicle model homes in the 1920s. His designs were featured on the covers of Walter Dixon's Home Designer and Garden Beautiful Magazine and the Golden Gate International Exposition Model Home Tour in 1939.
