= Valley of the Moon (Tucson, Arizona) =

Children's fantasy park in Tucson, Arizona

Coordinates: 32°05′40″N 110°30′39″W

The Valley of the Moon is a Fantasy park in Tucson, Arizona built in the 1920s Storybook architecture. It is listed on the National Register of Historic Places listings for Pima County, Arizona. Tucson's city council has zoned it as a historic landmark.

The 3 acre Valley of the Moon park was originally constructed by self taught disabled builder and architect George Phar Legler along with friends and railroad hobo's beginning in 1923 then continuing to 1963 over that span of 40 years. The Valley of the Moon is located at 2544 E. Allen Rd, Tucson. Most historic information is spread by word of mouth and almost no history was written down.
