= Fairy-Tale House =

Building in St. Petersburg, Russia (1906–1942)

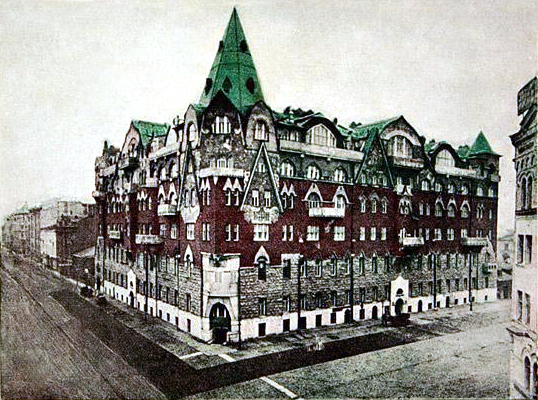

General information
- Status: Destroyed
- Architectural style: Northern Art Nouveau with Neo-Russian elements
- Location: Saint Petersburg, Russia
- Construction started: 1906
- Completed: 1909
- Demolished: 1942
- Owner: A goldsmith with the last name Koltsov

Height
- Height: 45 m (148 ft) roof

Technical details
- Floor count: 7

Design and construction
- Architect: Alexandre Bernardazzi

The Fairy-Tale House (Russian: Дом-сказка) is the popular name given to House No. 21–23 on St Petersburg's English Avenue for its striking, unusual façade.

== Building ==
In 1909, the architect Alexander Bernardazzi commissioned by Koltsov, a goldsmith, to build an apartment building at the corner of Offitserskaya Street (now Dekabristov Street) and English Avenue, which was immediately nicknamed the "Fairy Tale House" by the citizens of St Petersburg for its appearance.

The whimsical mixture of various romantic styles - Northern Art Nouveau and Neo-Russian, the whimsically shaped windows and balconies, the corner tower, the cladding of the walls with natural stone, and the colourful majolica panels, some experts believe to have been designed by Mikhail Vrubel, allowed the author to set against the background of the old Kolomna buildings a sight like a theatre set. On the façade, the sculptor Konstantin Rausch von Traubenberg carved the Phoenix bird from stone, which seemed to support on its wings the corner bay window of the Tale House.

The proximity to the Mariinsky Theatre largely determined the make-up of the first inhabitants of the house. They were mainly theatre workers and actors. The Russian ballet dancer Anna Pavlova lived there, so among St. Petersburg citizens this house was still known as "Anna Pavlova's House". Ballet master Mikhail Fokin and poet Samuil Marshak, professors of the St. Petersburg Conservatory, composers, actors and directors visited it. One of the flats was occupied by Academician Ignaty Krachkovsky, founder of the Russian school of Arabic studies and author of the book "Above Arabian Manuscripts"; the other was occupied by the singer and professor of the Conservatory Eugenia Bronskaya. In the 1930s, the sculptor Matvei Manizer moved into the house.

== Fire ==
In the winter of 1942 a fire broke out in the house. For several days the inhabitants, exhausted by hunger, fought the fire together with the firefighters by extending hoses to the ice hole in the Pryazhka River. The inhabitants managed to save only the yard part of the building and the façade, decorated with mosaics, collapsed. After the war, the building was disassembled and only the yard wings were preserved. The building was rebuilt on the old foundations, without restoration of the exterior.

The austere and modest architecture of the restored house no longer resembled a fairy-tale composition born in the architect's imagination. However, the memories of the "Fairy Tale House" are so persistent that even today the residents of Kolomna call the unremarkable house on Dekabristov Street by that name.

The famous St Petersburg sculptor and creator of decorative dolls, Roman Shustrov, lived in the new building for a considerable part of his life.

== See also ==
- Art Nouveau architecture in Russia
- Storybook architecture
