= Harry Oliver =

American film director (1888-1973)

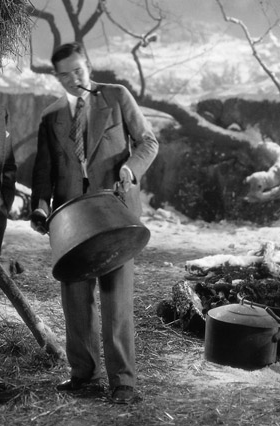
- Harry Oliver on the battlefield set of 7th Heaven in 1927
- Born: April 4, 1888; Hastings, Minnesota, U.S.
- Died: July 4, 1973 (aged 85); Woodland Hills, Los Angeles, California, U.S.
- Occupations: Art director, artist, humorist
- Writing career
- Period: 1914–1965
- Genres: early naturalistic cinema; early expressionist cinema; Western humor
- Website: phantomranch.net/hofc

Harry Oliver (April 4, 1888 – July 4, 1973) was an American humorist, artist, and Academy Award nominated art director of films from the 1920s and 1930s. Besides his outstanding work in Hollywood, he is now best remembered for his humorous writings about the American Southwest, and his publication (1946–1964) of the Desert Rat Scrap Book, an irregular broadsheet devoted to the Southwest. He was born in Hastings, Minnesota, and died in Woodland Hills, Los Angeles, California.

He is known for his Hollywood work as art director on the films 7th Heaven (1927) and Street Angel (1928), for which he was nominated for the very first Academy Awards, as well as set design or art direction on the films Ben-Hur: A Tale of the Christ (1925), Sparrows (1926), Scarface (1932), Viva Villa! (1934), Mark of the Vampire (1935), and The Good Earth (1937).

== Life and works ==
=== Early years ===
Harold Griffith Oliver was born in Hastings, Minnesota, April 4, 1888, to Mary Simmons (born in Minnesota) and Frederick William Oliver (born in England). Raised in a Tom Sawyer environment, he associated with trappers, timbermen and steamboat men, and became an expert canoesman, guide, and muskrat hunter while a very young man. His father, Frederick Oliver, ran a general store in pioneer conditions.

Oliver's formal education was scanty. He said, "I attended public school in Eau Claire, Wisconsin, until the fourth grade, that's when dad put me to work in a small town print shop in hopes that I would learn to spell."

After working as a bill-poster for the Ringling Brothers circus, Oliver moved with his family to Puget Sound, Washington, in 1909. He worked as a scenic painter for the first Seattle world's fair where he met famous hat-maker John B. Stetson, who gave Oliver his trademark black Stetson hat.

Harry's parents soon settled down on a chicken ranch in Santa Cruz, California, where Oliver worked as a burro-driver for the U.S. Forest Service. In 1910 Oliver returned to Minnesota to wed Alice Elizabeth Fernlund, "a pretty little Minnesota bear trapper" who later bore him two daughters, Amy Fern and Mary Alice. Oliver and Alice returned to the chicken ranch in Santa Cruz. Oliver worked odd jobs, including scenic artist with small theaters. "One day a movie company came to town with an opening, and I got the job."

=== Hollywood years ===
Harry Oliver ... was noted for his atmospheric settings and controlled environments. In fact the German expressionists learned a bit from Harry Oliver (and not the other way around). One of Oliver's specialties was recreating really believable exterior locations on the back lot ...

— Robert Birchard, 1999,

Oliver worked on various Hollywood productions from around 1911 to 1941, rising from set painter to set dresser to art director. A complete record of all his films is probably not available, but here is a partial list:

- 1914: The Sparrow
- 1919: Behind the Door; The Grim Game
- 1920: Down Home; Below the Surface
- 1921: The Face of the World
- 1924: The Hill Billy aka The Hillbilly
- 1925: Little Annie Rooney; Ben-Hur: A Tale of the Christ
- 1926: The Black Pirate; Sparrows
- 1927: The Gaucho; 7th Heaven
- 1928: Street Angel
- 1929: Sunny Side Up; The River; Lucky Star; They Had to See Paris
- 1930: Liliom; Lightnin'; Song o' My Heart; City Girl
- 1932: Movie Crazy; Scarface
- 1933: White Woman; Tillie and Gus; Dancing Lady
- 1934: The Band Plays On; Peck's Bad Boy; The Cat's-Paw; David Harum; Viva Villa!
- 1935: Vanessa: Her Love Story; Mark of the Vampire
- 1937: Make a Wish; The Good Earth; The Californian
- 1938: Of Human Hearts; Little Orphan Annie
- 1941: The Outlaw

Leo Carrillo told me that M.G.M.'s European offices rent their copies of Viva Villa to all the countries of the world. They rent the film when the people of a country get "REVOLUTION HUNGRY."

— Harry Oliver, 1962,

=== Architecture ===
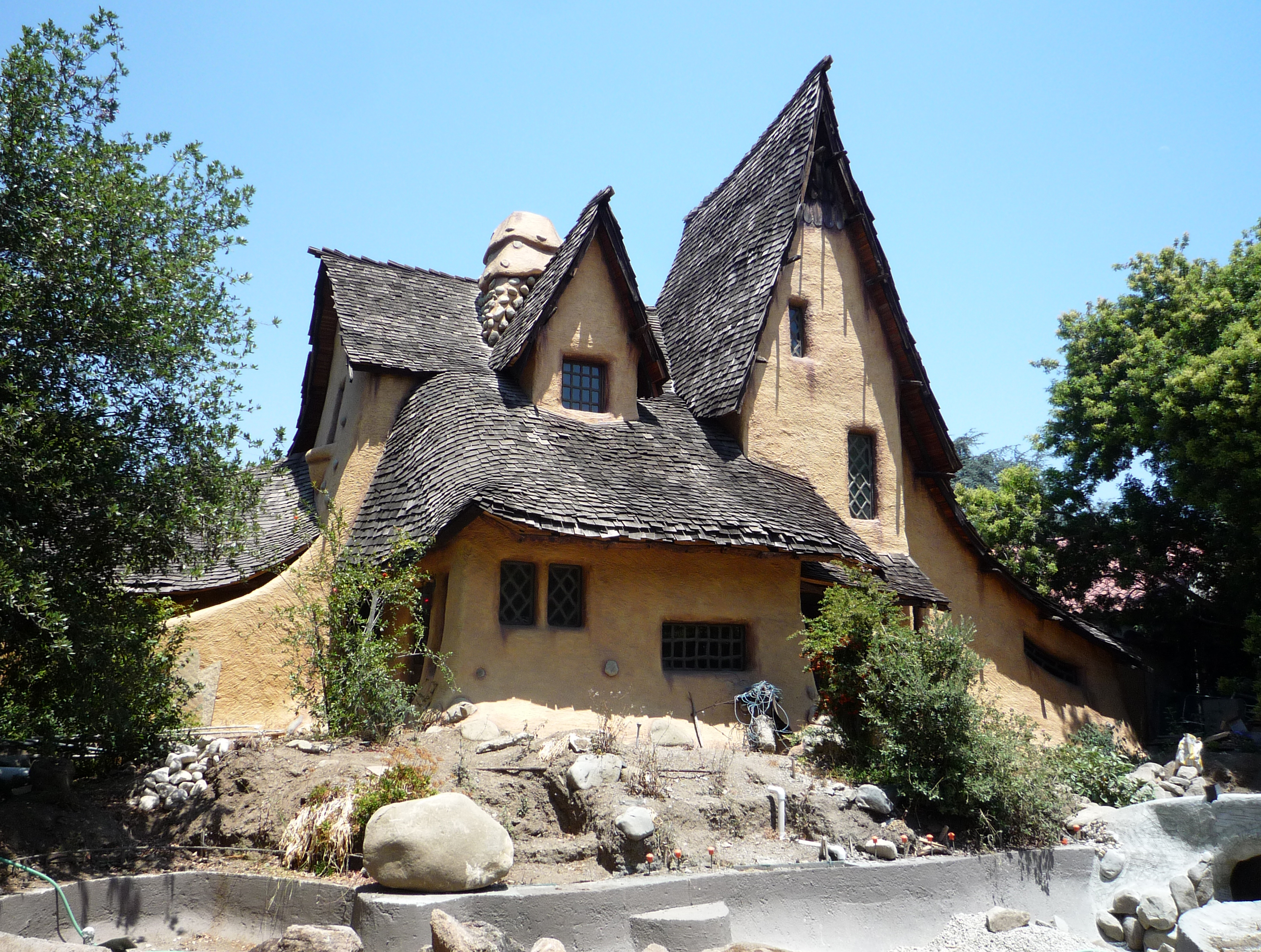
Oliver's Spadena House, also known as The Witch's House (1921).

Designing and building structures occupied portions of both the professional and personal life of Oliver. For illustrations of some of these, see the Harry Oliver architecture page.

Oliver built a number of adobe houses for himself and his family, both because he liked the esthetic effect, and because the building materials were extremely inexpensive. The first of these was La Ballona Rancho (named after nearby Ballona Creek), built beginning in 1917 near the old Palms film studios. In 1980 it was still standing at the corner of National and Exposition Blvd. in Los Angeles.

Homesteading at Borrego Springs (see below), Oliver built his Rancho Borego house from 1930 – "a real first class, old time Spanish residence" and "surely a credit to the valley" according to the local newspaper. It was still standing in 2002, "not far from the Pegleg Monument. But I will warn you right now, the current owner does not take to trespassers, and does not want anybody poking around the old place. Seriously."

Moving to San Juan Capistrano in the late 1930s, where he managed a general store–trading post after retiring from Hollywood, he may have built another adobe house for himself, but documentation on this is sparse. And when he finally moved to Thousand Palms, California he built his famous Old Fort Oliver, "as old as the hills, 'cause that's where I got the adobe."

A 'dobe house is fireproof, if built right, and one story high; earthquake proof, dust proof, sound proof, heat and cold proof, rat and termite proof, oh, and yes, bullet proof and almost proof against bad design, due to the thickness of its walls and damned if they don't take on more character with age.

— Harry Oliver, 1946,

Besides his work on film sets, Oliver's known professional designs date from the 1920s onward. The elaborate gingerbread Willat-Spadena Witch House (1921), "perhaps the ultimate example of Storybook Style" , with no two windows or angles alike, was originally built on the set of the Irvin Willat Film Studio in Culver City, then moved to Beverly Hills in 1934 and converted to a private residence.

Another of Oliver's designs was the original Van de Kamp Bakery windmill, the corporate symbol of that firm. It was built at the Willat Studio film lot around 1921, then moved about 200 feet (61 m) south of Beverly Drive on Western Blvd. The design was reproduced in the widely-spread bakery cottages around Southern California. Very few of these now survive.

Members of the Lawry's Foods and Van de Kamp Bakery families decided to build a restaurant at the corner of Boyce and Los Feliz in Hollywood. They commissioned a design from Oliver, who constructed the Storybook Style building aided by movie studio carpenters. This Tam O'Shanter Inn opened in June 1922 and was a great success. The owner said, "Every piece of wood which was used in this structure was thrown into fire first with the result that we never had to paint it and it got more beautiful as the years went by." ^{(L.L.Frank to B.Stohler)} It was since remodeled and renamed the Great Scot.

In 1935, Oliver was engaged to design, direct and produce Gold Gulch, the largest concession at the San Diego World's Fair (California Pacific International Exposition). Gold Gulch was a 21-acre (85,000 m^{2}) old west mining camp and ghost town replica which undoubtedly inspired the Knotts Berry Farm Ghost Town, which Oliver was consulted upon but was not formally involved with.

In 1946–1947, Oliver designed and supervised the construction of the Arabian Nights Stage at the National Date Festival fairgrounds in Indio, California. Gaudy productions have been staged in this faux–Baghdad fantasyland from 1948 to the present.

=== Family life ===
Of his family, Oliver said, "My sister Amy Silver died giving birth to twins. My other sister Francis was a bright little brown-eyed newspaper woman in the good old days {circa World War I}. My (older) brother Fred was a Western Auto sales buyer for years."

In 1910 Oliver traveled from California to Minnesota to wed Alice Elizabeth Fernlund (1896?–1935) who bore him two daughters, Amy Fern and Mary Alice. When Oliver homesteaded in the desert in 1929 (see below) he spent much time there, as well as at remote locations for his movie work. This removal from his Los Angeles home put great strains on the marriage, which seems to have ended around 1929.

Oliver moved back to the Palms house after the death of Alice Oliver from tuberculosis (age 39) on 9 January 1935, and raised his two daughters with a succession of housekeepers. He soon met Ruth Dayton whilst engaged in his San Diego World's Fair project (see below). "She amused Harry from the start – riding backward on a burro down the narrow winding road into 'Gold Gulch'." Ruth and Oliver were married in San Diego on 27 July 1935; she was 29, he was 47. "However Harry soon learned Ruth was a bit too fond of booze ... resulting in a short stormy marriage."

In 1936–1937 Oliver decided he needed to spend more time with his daughters. He pulled them out of school and together they traveled all over California, visiting all the missions, the construction site of the Golden Gate Bridge, numerous Gold Rush locales, "and Harry kept his daughters busy writing history theses on everything they saw."

By 1941 the daughters were grown and married with children of their own, and Oliver left Tinseltown for good, relocating to Thousand Palms, California where he built Old Fort Oliver (see below). His daughters' families spent a great deal of time at the Fort; some descendants, like granddaughter Betty Jo, told of happily "growing up" there.

=== Desert rat years I ===
Oliver seems to have started adopting his Desert Rat persona in 1916, when he was introduced to life in California's Borrego Valley (which he insisted on spelling Borego), and with the informal formation of the Pegleg Smith Liar's Club, made up of Los Angeles desert enthusiasts and Anza-Borrego area homesteaders. In the following decades, Hollywood and Los Angeles artists and literati established a small vacation colony at Borrego Springs, more remote and modest than the Hollywood colony just north in Palm Springs.

Oliver homesteaded in Borrego from 1929. He gained media attention by carving and weathering dozens of wooden peglegs which he scattered around area hillsides and gullies, so that rockhounds and tourists might think themselves on the track of the fabulous Lost Pegleg Mine. The Riverside Enterprise newspaper wrote, "Defending himself, Oliver says the Government stocks trout streams for fisherman, why shouldn't I stock the desert with peglegs?"

Inspired by the characters and liars of Borrego, Oliver wrote a series of local color stories for Life Magazine (the 1883–1936 humor journal, not the Henry Luce photojournalism magazine). He later collected and expanded on these stories for his own publications (Desert Rough Cuts, 99 Days In The Desert, The Old Mirage Salesman. and Desert Rat Scrap Book.) His desert stories also appeared in magazines such as The Gold Miner, Todo, The Grizzly Bear, New Mexico, Desert Magazine, Stage, and others. He later wrote columns for Desert Magazine, Arizona Highways, and daily for a group of California and Arizona newspapers. "But my writing wasn't in demand until I became my own publisher", he said.

Oliver moved to Thousand Palms, California (just north of Palm Springs) three weeks after Pearl Harbor Day, 1941. He passed the duration of World War II growing rubber at Bell Ranch and working with the US Army at Palm Springs Airport. And immediately after the war, he started producing the Desert Rat Scrap Book.

=== Desert rat years II ===
Desert rat; a 1949 publication

When you've been here in the Desert a few years you find yourself talking to yourself ... After a few more years you find yourself talking to the lizards ... Then in another couple of years you find the lizards talking to you ... When you find yourself stealing their amazing tales you are about ready to start a Desert paper.

— Harry Oliver, 1948,

Oliver produced 44 'quarterly' issues of his Desert Rat Scrap Book or DRSB newspaper, often at irregular intervals, between 1946–1965, until his health and optimism failed. In 1967 he gave his operation to ex-merchant seaman Bill Powers, who produced two more issues and reprinted a few old issues, then abandoned the DRSB forever and disappeared, possibly returning to sea. While it lasted, the DRSB had a devoted worldwide audience.

=== Publications ===
- "Desert Rat Scrap Book". Quarterly. Thousand Palms, CA: Hubbard Printing. 1945–1967. OCLC 5577299.
- The Old Mirage Salesman: a Whimsical Desert Digest of Refreshing Nonsense Heralding the life of the Southwest's Foremost Story-telling Desert Rat, Harry Oliver, 1888–1999 [sic], Editor, Humorist, Historian, Publicist, Pioneer, Philosopher, Prospector, Showman, Builder, Hermit, and Secessionist. Palm Springs, CA: Printery. 1952. p. 111. LCCN 52028502. OCLC 1954389. – compiled by his daughters, Amy and Mary Oliver
- 99 Days in the Desert, with Sandy Walker. Corona, CA: Green Lantern Print Shop. 1941. OCLC 10520796. – reprints of his column "Desert Briefs" which appeared in various newspapers
- Desert Rough Cuts; a Haywire History of the Borego Desert. Los Angeles: Ward Ritchie Press. 1938. p. 64. OCLC 6679949. LCC F868.B6 O5
- All's Not Gold That Glitters. San Diego: Don Hildreth. 1987. p. 19. OCLC 55485678. – WorldCat Notes: "'From his [i.e. Harry Oliver's] book, Desert rough cuts, a haywire history of the Borego Desert.' ... Includes several quotations from various sources, and Manana [i.e. Man?ana], a poem by S. Omar Barker. Printed and bound to resemble a book of matches, with the leaves stapled in place of matches." Series: Tumbleweeds west
- Whiskey Joe: a Story with a Moral. San Diego: Ash Ranch Press. 1989. p. 17. OCLC 55485733. – WorldCat notes: "'We have whiskey & we have whisky.' Printed and bound to resemble a book of matches, with the leaves stapled in place of matches." Don Hildredth listed as contributor.
- Recollections of Harry Oliver, Oral History Transcript. Los Angeles: Oral History Program, University of California. 1969. p. 42. OCLC 215402298. – WorldCat abstract: Comments [with interviewer Diana Dreiman] on work as an art director in silent and sound moving pictures. Oliver recalls his work on various pictures, including Ben Hur and The Good Earth, and his innovations in set design.

== See also ==
- Desert Rat Scrap Book
- Desert Steve Ragsdale
- Calico Print
