= Leon Max =

Russian-American fashion designer and retailer

- Born: Leonid Maksovich Rodovinsky; 12 February 1954 (age 72); Leningrad, Soviet Union
- Citizenship: United States
- Occupation: Fashion designer
- Known for: Founder of Max Studio upmarket fashion retail chain
- Spouse: Yana Boyko (m. 2014)
- Website: maxstudio.com

Leon Max (born Leonid Maksovich Rodovinsky; Russian: Леонид Максович Родовинский; 12 February 1954) is a Russian-American fashion designer and retailer.

== Early life ==
Max was born in Leningrad, Soviet Union (now Saint Petersburg), in 1954, to a playwright and a civil engineer. His father's mother was Jewish which allowed him to leave the Soviet Union in 1974. He then sought political asylum to Vienna on his way to Israel. He later enrolled at the Fashion Institute of Technology in New York City. He became a naturalized United States citizen in 1986, at which time he legally changed his name to Leon Max.

== Career ==
He worked as a personal trainer in New York. He then worked for the New York fashion house Tahari, and then Los Angeles-based Bis, a women’s sportswear firm.

He founded Max Studio in 1979. An upmarket fashion chain, Max Studio sells through department stores. It also has 46 of its own retail stores in the U.S. and another 50 in the Far East.

In July 2012, he received an honorary degree from the University of Northampton.

== Personal life ==
Max has been married three times, and has three children. His first two marriages ended in divorce. His first marriage was to model Kim Reynolds, mother of his daughter, Sophie Max for whom he named a clothing line. His second marriage with Ame Austin, an American model and stylist, ended with his 2009 divorce fillings. In 2014, he married Yana Boyko, a Ukrainian model.

In 2005, he purchased Easton Neston in Northamptonshire, England from Lord Hesketh. He converted the 10,000-square-foot (930 m^{2}) fire damaged Wren wing of the house, plus the outbuildings which were the home of defunct Formula One team Hesketh Racing, into a design studio. The interior design was done by Lady Henrietta Spencer-Churchill. In July 2011, a party was thrown at Easton Neston to celebrate the completion of its renovation. It was hosted by Richard Dennen, Mary Charteris and Josephine de La Baume.

In 2010, he purchased Castillo del Lago in the Hollywood Hills, near the Hollywood Sign, in Los Angeles, California.

According to The Sunday Times in 2020, Max has a net worth of £410 million.
