= Ard Eevin =

Historic house in California, United States

- U.S. National Register of Historic Places
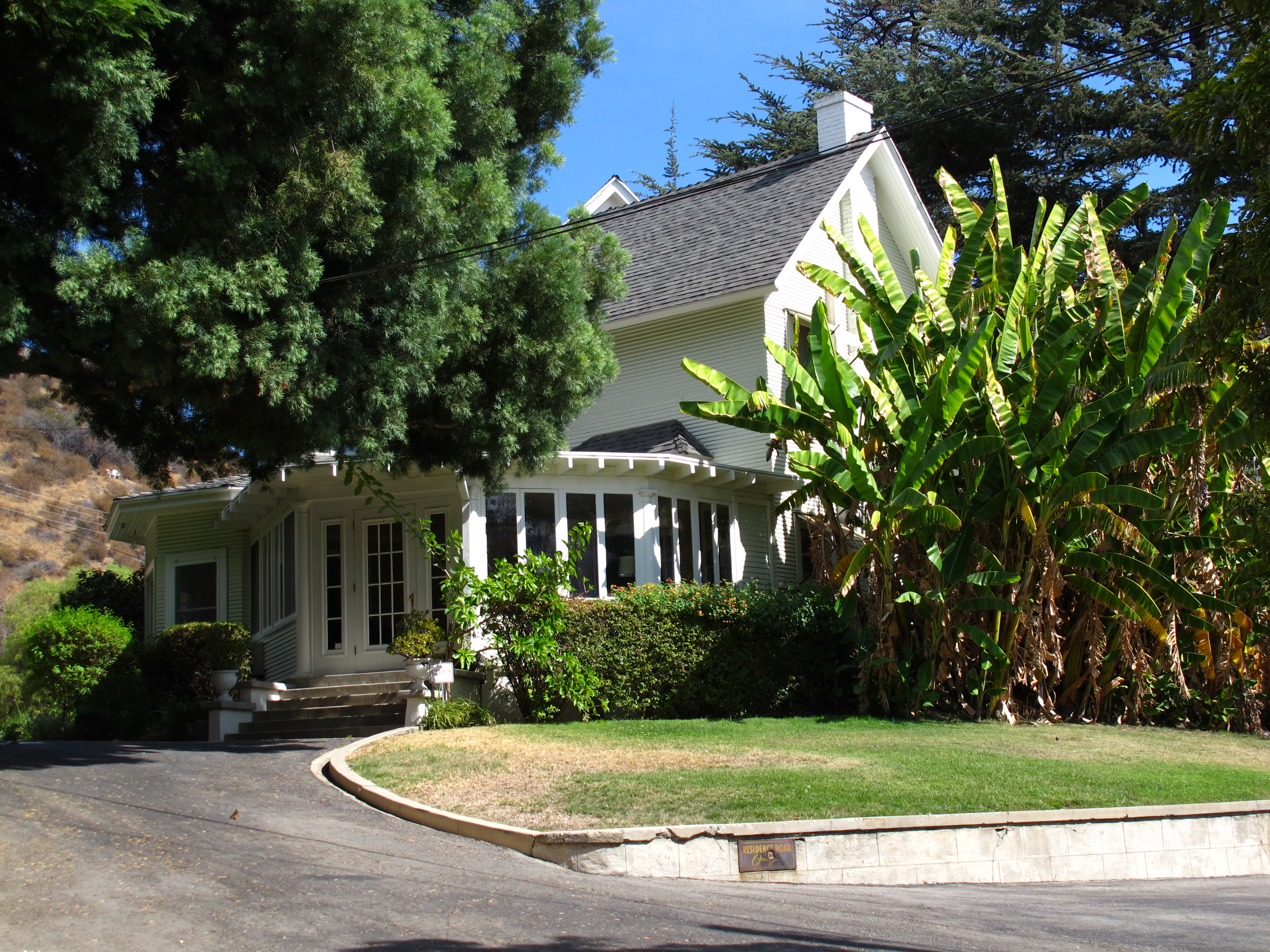
- Ard Eevin in 2012

- Location within California Location within the United States
- Location: 851 W. Mountain Street, Glendale, California
- Coordinates: 34°10′37″N 118°16′13″W
- Area: 0.75 acres (0.30 ha)
- Built: 1903
- Architect: Nathaniel Dryden
- Architectural style: Colonial Revival, Bungalow/craftsman, Eclectic
- NRHP reference No.: 06001087
- Added to NRHP: November 21, 2006

Ard Eevin is a historic mansion in Glendale, California, U.S.. It was built in 1903 for Daniel Campbell. It was designed by architect Nathaniel Dryden. The name "Ard Eevin" means "beautiful heights" in Scottish Gaelic. It has been listed on the National Register of Historic Places since November 21, 2006.

Today, it's now a private residence.

== See also ==
- Glendale Register of Historic Resources and Historic Districts
