= John DeLario =

American architect

John Lucian DeLario
- Born: July 16, 1888; Wyoming
- Died: January 1, 1950 (aged 61); Los Angeles County, California
- Occupation: Architect
- Buildings: Castillo del Lago; Sidney Woodruff Residence; Wolf's Lair

John Lucian DeLario was an American architect known for his work in the Hollywoodland neighborhood of Hollywood, Los Angeles during the 1920s.

== Life ==
John DeLario was born in Wyoming on July 16, 1888 and died in Los Angeles County, California on January 1, 1950.

== Career ==
DeLario operated a practice in the Los Angeles area c. 1925-1950 and was the lead architect in Hollywoodland as the neighborhood was developed. His clients included C. Dallas Howland, H. A. Clarke, Mack Sennett, Patrick M. Longan, Edwin R. Ribler, Helena Lau Giffen, George R. Hannan, Joe Rock, Clara Shatto, Sherman A. Hays, Edward W. Hedland, Clair R. Savage, Roderick D. Burnham, and H. S. Belland.

John DeLario's designs were influenced by Spanish, Italian, and French styles, and many are representative of the Romantic architecture movement that was popular in Los Angeles in the 1920s.

=== List of works ===
==== Hollywoodland ====
DeLario designed many houses in Los Angeles's Hollywoodland tract, several of which remain today. His designs include:

- Sidney Woodruff Residence (1926) — Spanish Colonial Revival house built by the Western Construction Company and later used as a model home for development in the neighborhood, LAHCM No. 681
- Castillo del Lago (1926) — 10,500-square-foot (980 m^{2}) Spanish style estate on a 3-acre (12,000 m^{2}) property
- Wolf's Lair (1927) — Chateauesque single-family estate
- Estate atop Mount Hollywoodland (1920s) — Designed for Mack Sennett and budgeted at $1 million ($18.4 million in 2025), lot and driveway built, estate cancelled in 1933, site of a television studio then radio tower since 1939

==== Elsewhere in Los Angeles ====
- 133 S. Plymouth (1923) — Built by Birch O’Neal Co. for M. J. O’Dowd
- Harry F. Haldeman House (1925) —Two story Spanish Colonial Revival house owned by Harry F. Haldeman
- Andrew Getty Estate (1926) — Seven-acre Spanish-style villa owned by Miklós Rózsa, then Andrew Getty
- 654 S. Rimpau (1927)
- 644 S. Muirfield
- 620, 630, and 638 S. Rossmore

==== Elsewhere ====
- Ralph B. Lloyd Estate, Beverly Hills (1930) — Multi-acre Italian villa owned by Ralph B. Lloyd
