= Lawrence and Martha Joseph Residence and Apartments =

Storybook architecture, Los Angeles

Hobbit Houses
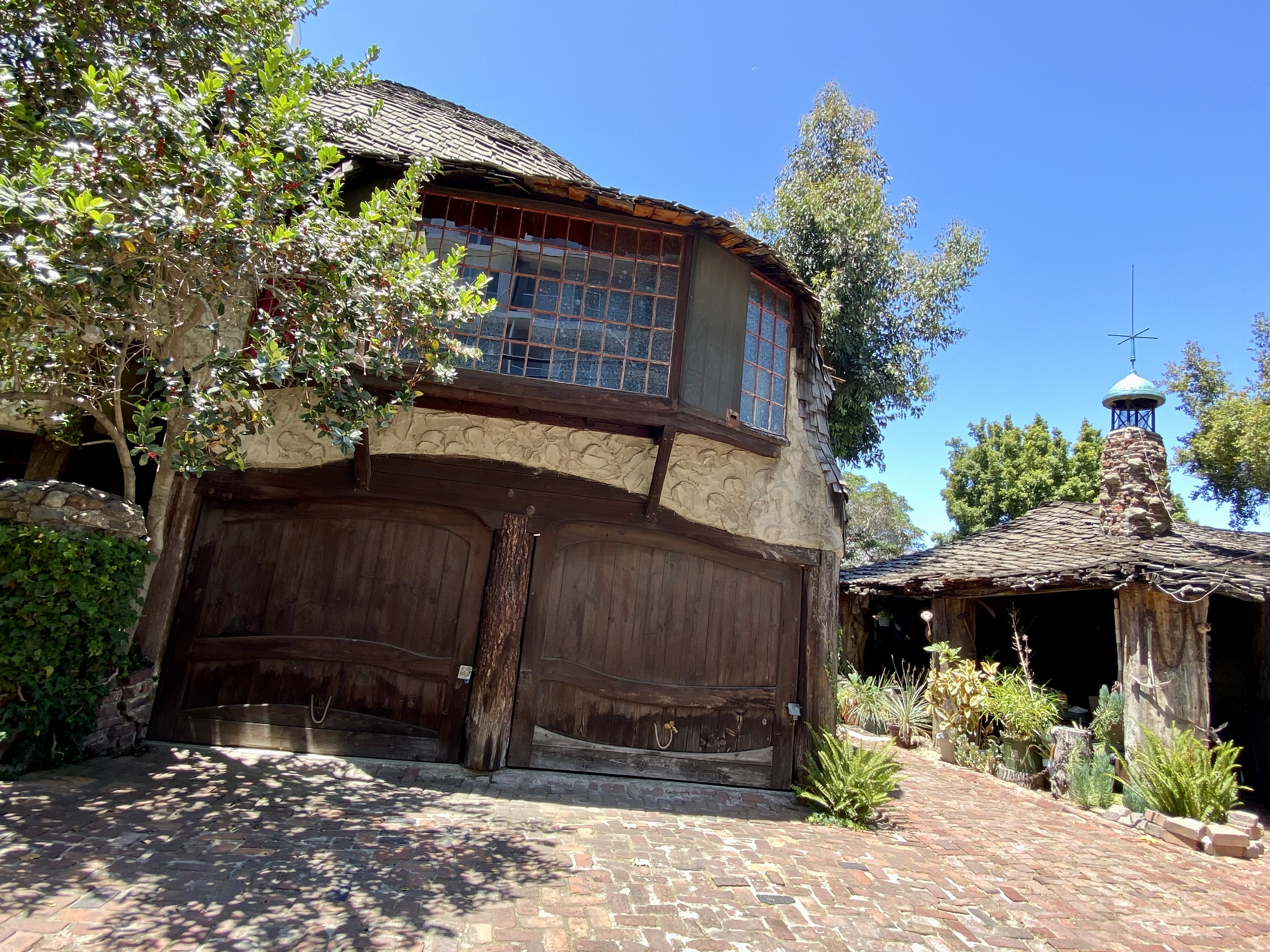
- Apartments and driveway
- Interactive map of Hobbit Houses
- 34.0223°N 118.3994°W
- Location: 3819–3827 Dunn Dr. Palms, Los Angeles, California, U.S.

History
- Built: 1946–1970

Site notes
- Architect: Lawrence Joseph
- Architectural style: Storybook house

Los Angeles Historic-Cultural Monument
- Designated: 1996
- Reference no.: 624

The Lawrence and Martha Joseph Residence and Apartments, often called the Hobbit Houses, are a landmarked example of the Storybook style of architecture in Los Angeles, California. One architectural guidebook dates the original "garden court"-style building to 1925.

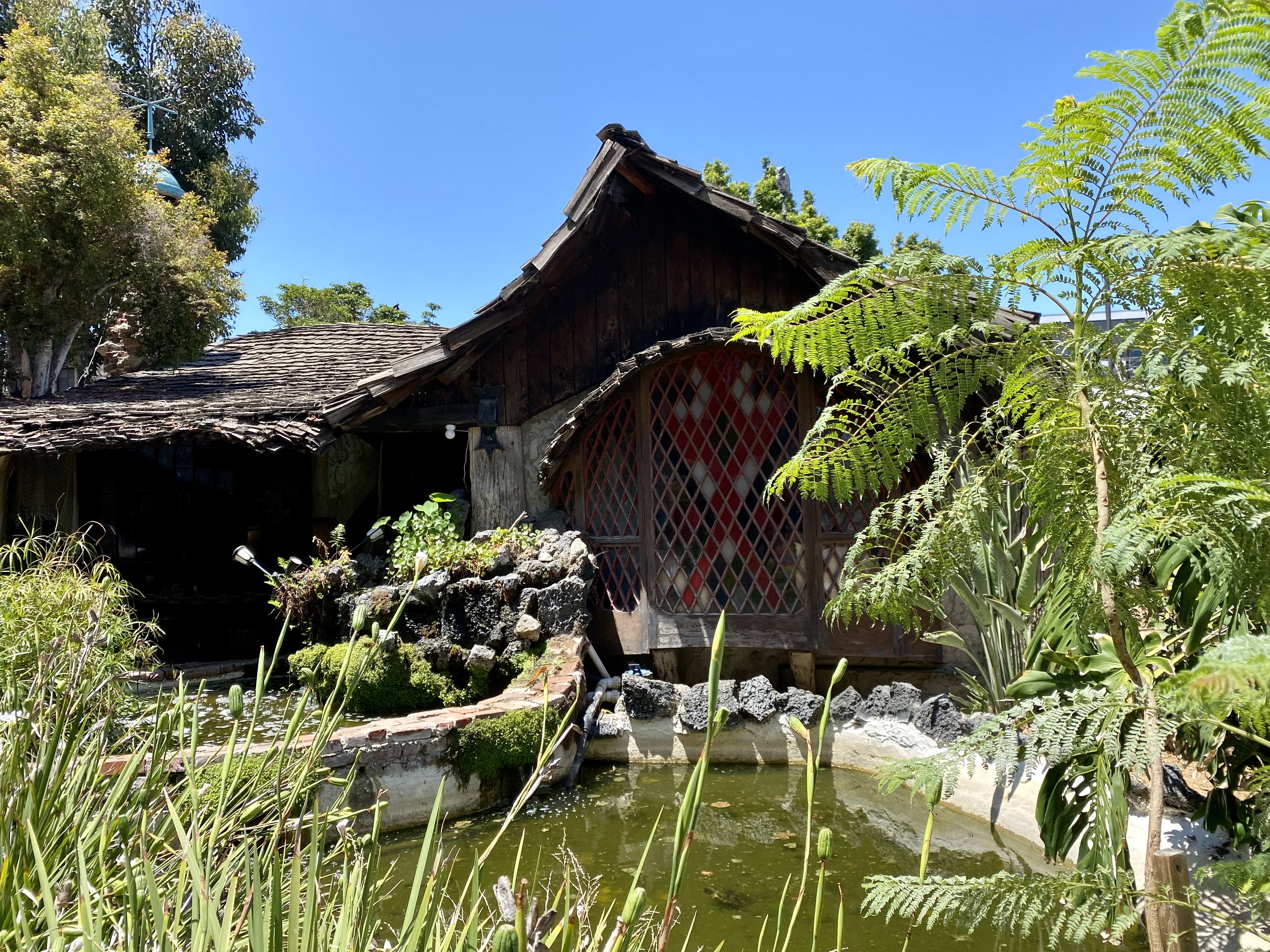
Hobbit Houses turtle pond

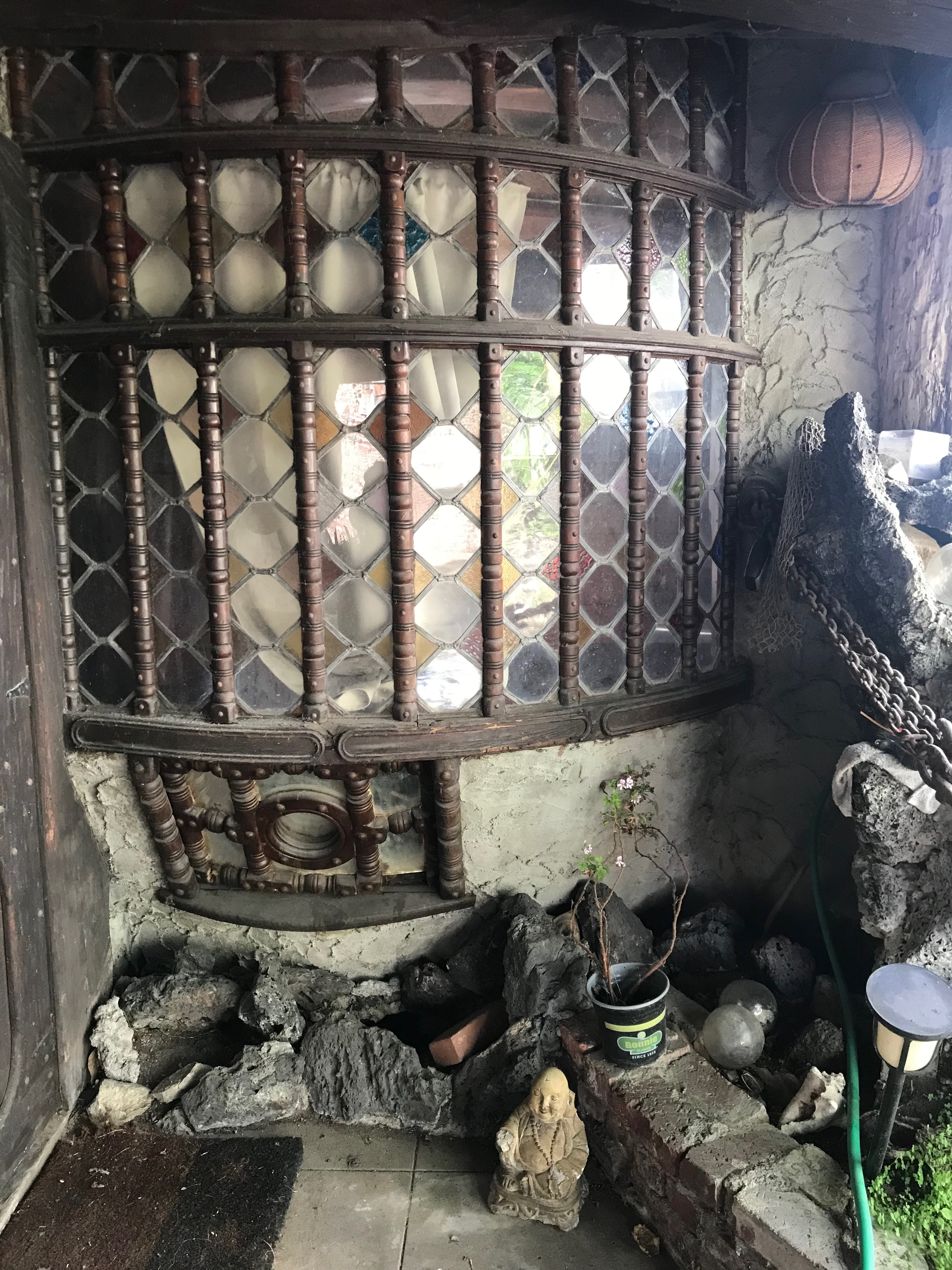
Leaded art glass windows at the Hobbit Houses.

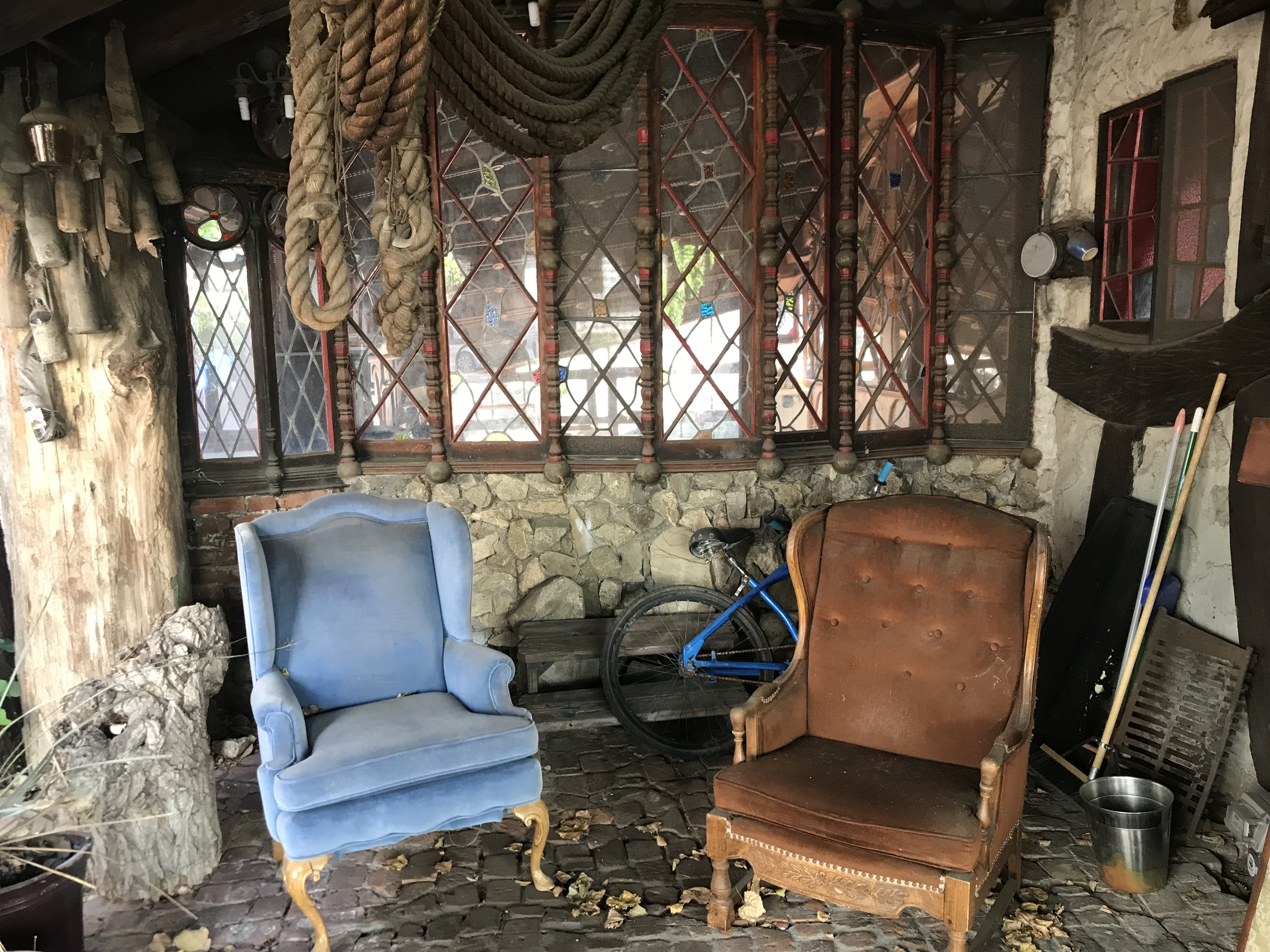
Woodwork and leaded glass at the Hobbit Houses.

The informal name "Hobbit Houses" is due to their supposed resemblance to the architecture of Tolkien's Shire.

Some of the "Fantasy Revival" architectural details include "odd-shaped windows with leaded glass, rustic stone hewn walls, a rough cut cupola, and sloping, uneven roof tiles.”

The builder, Lawrence Joseph, worked for Walt Disney Studios and Lockheed aerospace company, and built the apartment complex in his spare time. An expert sailor, Joseph included nautical elements in many aspects of the interior design, including galley-style kitchens and "vertical-grain boat planking ... in eccentric circles on the floors".

According to one source, "The property boasts of having no door knobs and no 90 degree angles anywhere inside the homes." Rather than door knobs, "Doors open with boat latches and levers, all fashioned by Joseph. Jauntily knotted ropes serve as pulls on many of the drawers."

One architectural historian working with the Los Angeles Conservancy told the Los Angeles Times, "It's almost like a folk art environment along the lines of the Watts Towers."

The property consists of seven apartments spread across a former single-family residence and two additional two-unit buildings constructed by Joseph.

In 2014, The Washington Post reported on a rental listing for a place in the original building:

The main house features two bedrooms and one bath, plus a huge bonus room that could be an office or den. The living room that is situated around an original stone fireplace features stained glass windows, nautical details and a bar that is perfect for entertaining. The quaint kitchen comes with a mini-fridge that is built in. two bedrooms sit behind a wooden plank door and offer great sunlight, and a view of the fountain and pond at the front of the house. The sparkling green tiled bathroom features a tub/shower combo with a large vanity and great custom built ins. The house also features a third bonus room off of the kitchen that could easily be used as an extra bedroom or entertaining space.

After Joseph died in 1991, Martha became the sole owner of the property until she died in 2004; Martha "donated an easement on the complex to the Los Angeles Conservancy" to keep the property intact.
