= Sidney Woodruff Residence =

Historic home in Hollywood, California. U.S.

- Interactive map of the Sidney Woodruff Residence area

General information
- Type: Single-family residence
- Architectural style: Spanish Colonial Revival
- Location: 3185 North Durand Drive, Hollywood, Los Angeles, California, U.S.
- Coordinates: 34°07′38″N 118°19′26″W
- Completed: 1925

Design and construction
- Architect: John DeLario

Los Angeles Historic-Cultural Monument
- Designated: June 14, 2000
- Reference no.: 681

Sidney Woodruff Residence, also known as S. H. Woodruff Residence, is a historic house located at 3185 North Durand Drive in Hollywood, California. It was declared Los Angeles Historic-Cultural Monument No. 681 in 2000.

== History ==
Sidney Woodruff Residence was designed by John DeLario, the lead architect in Los Angeles's Hollywoodland tract in the 1920s, and built by the Western Construction Company for Sidney H. Woodruff, the developer of Hollywoodland, in 1925. After completion, the house was used as a model for development of the rest of the neighborhood.

The building was declared Los Angeles Historic-Cultural Monument No. 681 on June 14, 2000.

== Architecture and design ==
Sidney Woodruff Residence features a Spanish Colonial Revival design.
