= Gold Gulch =

Former concession stand in California

Gold Gulch was the largest concession stand built for visitors at the California Pacific International Exposition, a world's fair open from 1935 to 1936 in San Diego, California. Gold Gulch was a section celebrating the California gold rush and the American frontier.

== Description ==
Gold Gulch, located within the World's Fairgrounds in Balboa Park, was a 21-acre (8.5 ha) Old West mining town and ghost town re-creation for fairgoers to experience the atmosphere of a mining boomtown. Gold Gulch was described in the Exposition Guide Book as "a moviefied" version of riproaring '49 days.

Gold Gulch occupied the canyon between the House of Charm and Pepper Grove, southeast of the Spreckels Organ Pavilion. It was composed of a dance hall and a music hall, rustic unpainted shacks, a brick bank with iron-barred windows, a "Chinese restaurant and laundry", and a hanging tree with a "dummy" hanging. Barkers lured visitors to a shooting gallery where a visiting "sharpshooter" hitting the bull's eye put all the lights out in the Gulch. An "Indian Village" was nearby, with trading posts and events.

Gold Gulch charged no admission, but its shops and attractions did. "One could have coffee in a tin cup, beer 'by the scupper', badges and rings made from horseshoe nails by the blacksmith, and have a photograph taken with fake beard, six shooter gun prop, a ten gallon cowboy hat on a mine-pack burro."

== Designer ==
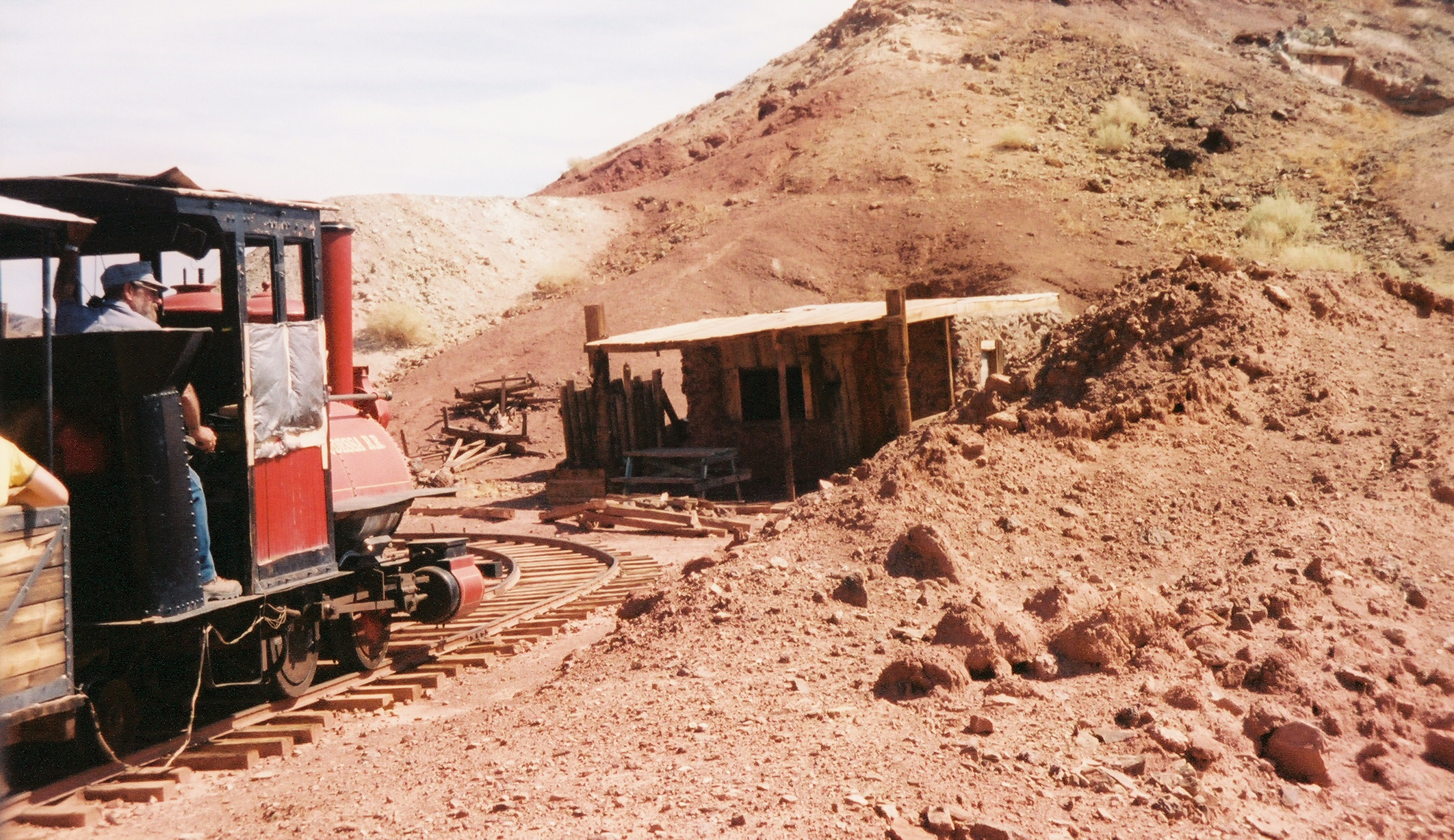
"Old mining train" ride at Calico Ghost Town, Mojave Desert (c. 2005)

Gold Gulch was designed, directed and produced by Harry Oliver, a renowned and Oscar-nominated Hollywood movie set designer, humorist, and Western writer.

== Legacy ==
The popularity and aesthetic accomplishments of Gold Gulch inspired and influenced subsequent Western theme parks and their "frontier village" attractions. Examples include the Calico Ghost Town restoration and the "Ghost Town" section of Knott's Berry Farm by Walter Knott, and Frontierland by Walt Disney.

== See also ==
- Ghost town
  - List of ghost towns in Arizona
  - List of ghost towns in California
  - List of ghost towns in Colorado
  - List of ghost towns in Nevada
- Gold prospecting
- Gold Rush
  - Black Hills Gold Rush
  - California Gold Rush
    - Women in the California Gold Rush
    - List of people associated with the California Gold Rush
  - Comstock Lode
  - Fairbanks Gold Rush
  - Georgia Gold Rush
  - Holcomb Valley gold rush
  - Pike's Peak Gold Rush
