= Nathaniel Dryden =

American architect

- Born: February 14, 1849; Montgomery County, Missouri, U.S.
- Died: March 7, 1924 (aged 75)
- Occupation: Architect
- Spouse: Helen Brand
- Children: 1

Nathaniel Dryden (1849–1924) was an American building contractor and architect.

== Early life ==
Nathaniel Dryden was born on February 14, 1849, in Montgomery County, Missouri. His father was Frederick Hambleton Dryden, born in Washington County, VA, in 1812, and his mother was Catherine E. Sharp. He was a relative of the San Diego building contractor, David Owen Dryden (1877–1946) who built notable bungalows in the city during the 1910s. A great-grandfather, David Dryden Jr., erected a two-story log house in 1772, which was listed on the Register of Historic Virginia Homes, and has been called the oldest occupied residence in the state.

== Career ==
Nathaniel Dryden was a self taught architect, initially trained as a brick layer. He was known to have designed four large residential houses as well as twelve smaller homes in Glendale.

From 1893 to 1894, Dryden designed the Orson Thomas Johnson Office and Retail Building on Spring Street, between 4th Street and 5th Street, in Downtown Los Angeles for Orson Thomas Johnson (1839–1916).

In 1903, Dryden designed Ard Eevin for Daniel McPeak Campbell located at 851 West Mountain Street House in Glendale, California. It is on the National Register of Historic Places listings in Los Angeles County, California, since November 21, 2006. The home contains a mix of Colonial Revival, Craftsman and West Indies Plantation style elements and was completed on February 4, 1904. The name of the house Ard Eevin is Gallic for "beautiful heights."

In 1903–1904, he designed the private residence of Leslie Coombs Brand, his brother-in-law, and his wife Mary Louise Dean in Glendale. It is located about a mile from the Campbell residence and completed a year later. The Brand residence was named El Miradero or "grand view" in Spanish and cost $60,000 to build. It was constructed in a Saracenic style referencing the East India Pavilion that Brand visited at the World's Columbian Exposition. It is now the 'Brand Library and Art Center' branch of the Glendale Public Library.

In 1911, Dryden designed the Virginia Robinson Estate in Beverly Hills, California, for his daughter Virginia and his son-in-law, the heir of the Robinson's department store chain. This structure is one of the earliest residential structures in Beverly Hills, built of reinforced concrete in a Spanish style. The structure was reported to have cost $25,000 and to have contained 12 rooms; Dryden, who had a background as a building contractor, supervised the construction. Shortly before her death in 1977, Mrs. Robinson bequeathed her estate to Los Angeles County.

The fourth known residence designed by Dryden was built in 1913 for his daughter Ada B. Thompson at 1700 Grandview Avenue. The building a Dutch Colonial Revival style structure, originally featured scalloped wood shingles over a mansard-roof type design.

== Personal life and death ==
Dryden was married to Helen Brand, the sister of businessman Leslie Coombs Brand (1859–1925). Their daughter, Virginia Dryden Robinson (1877–1977), married Harry Winchester Robinson (1878–1932). He and his wife Helen moved to Los Angeles at the bequest of Leslie Brand.

Dryden lived in Southern California for most of his life. Eventually, he purchased 1,000 acres from the Rancho San Rafael owned by the Verdugo family, now located in Glendale, California, where he settled with his wife. He died on March 7, 1924. He was buried in the Brand Family Cemetery in Glendale.
