= Desert rat =

Desert rat or Desert Rat or their plurals may refer to:

== Rodents ==
- Gerbils (Gerbillinae) of the deserts of Africa and Asia
- Jerboas (Dipodidae) of the deserts of North Africa and Asia
- Kangaroo rats (Dipodomys) from North America
- Natal multimammate mouse (Mastomys natalensis) from Africa

== Military ==
- Desert Rats, the British 7th Armoured Division in World War II
- The Desert Rats (film), 1953 war film starring Richard Burton
- Operation Desert Rat, a military offensive of the Laotian Civil War

== Other ==
- Desert Research and Technology Studies, or Desert RATS, a set of field trials conducted by NASA
- Desert Rat Scrap Book, a California humor publication (1945–1967) focusing on the American Southwest
- Desert Rats, a book by Charles Lewis Camp

== See also ==
- Desert Rats vs. Afrika Korps, a 2004 real time strategy game based on the North Africa Campaign of World War II
- Desert woodrat, a small species of pack rat native to desert regions of western North America
- The Rat Patrol, an American TV program (1966–1968) loosely based on the North Africa Campaign of World War II
- The Rats of Tobruk, nickname for Allied soldiers holding the Libyan port of Tobruk while under siege in World War II
