= Virginia Robinson Gardens =

- Virginia Robinson Estate
- U.S. National Register of Historic Places
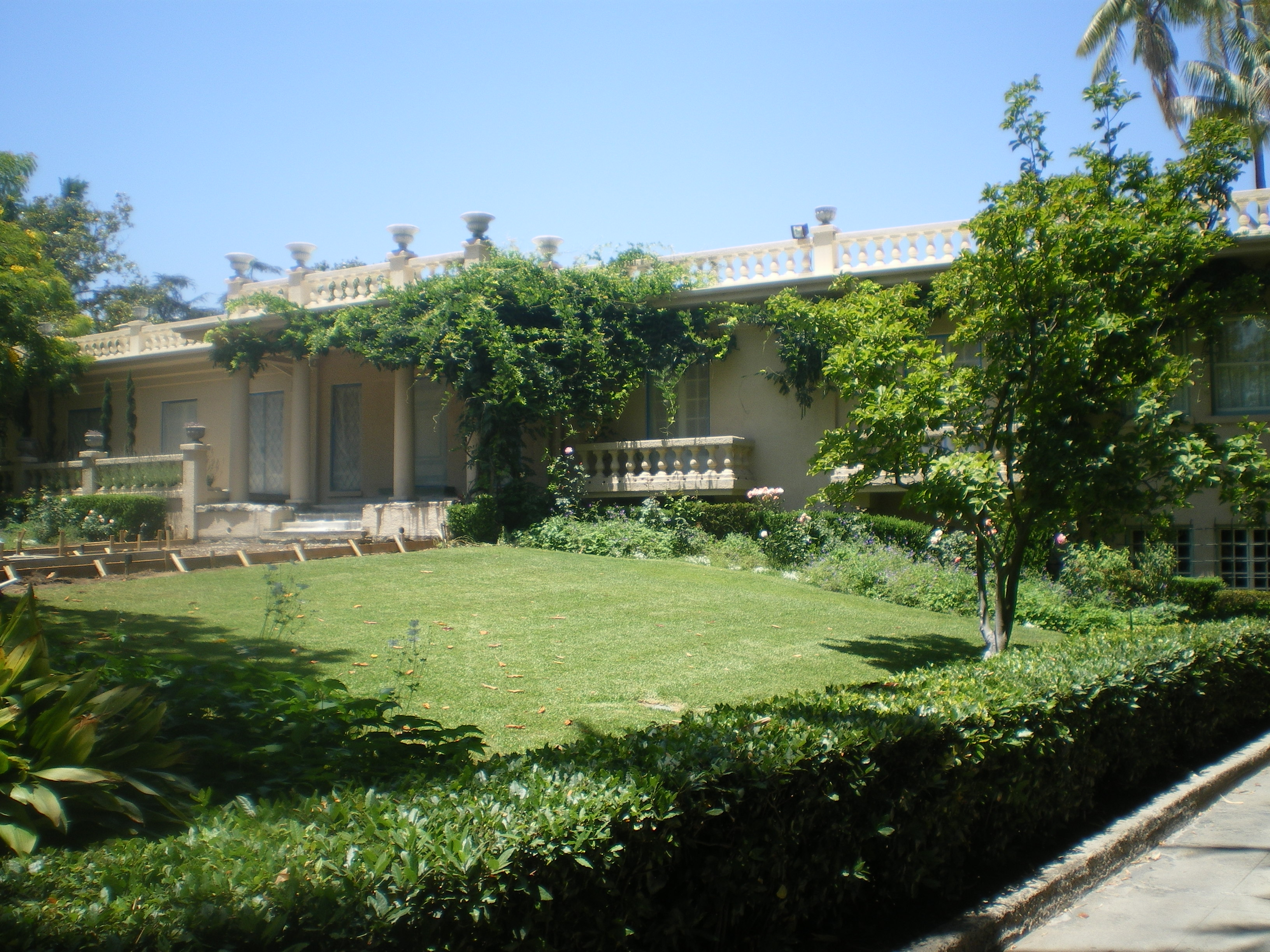
- Virginia Robinson residence and entry garden.

- Location within the Los Angeles metropolitan area Location within California Location within the United States
- Location: 1008 Elden Way, Beverly Hills, California
- Coordinates: 34°5′11″N 118°25′0″W
- Area: 6.2 acres (2.5 ha)
- Built: 1911
- Architect: Nathaniel Dryden
- Architectural style: Beaux Arts, Renaissance Revival
- Website: parks.lacounty.gov/virginia-robinson-gardens
- NRHP reference No.: 78000679
- Added to NRHP: November 15, 1978

The Virginia Robinson Gardens are the period landscape, historic mansion, and botanical gardens located at the Virginia Robinson Estate (6-acre (0.024 km^{2})) in Beverly Hills, California, United States.

== History ==
The Virginia Robinson Gardens is the earliest estate in Beverly Hills, California. It was the private residence of Virginia Dryden Robinson and Harry Winchester Robinson, heir to J. W. Robinson's Dept. Store.

The main house was designed in 1911 by architect Nathaniel Dryden, who was Virginia's father, in a Beaux Arts style. The residence is furnished with antiques and artifacts collected from around the world.

The Renaissance Revival pool pavilion was built in 1924. Decorative panels of sgraffito ornamentation adorn the Roman arches at the entry to the pavilion's solarium. The pavilion overlooks a long pool with mosaic tile wainscoting.

== Gardens ==
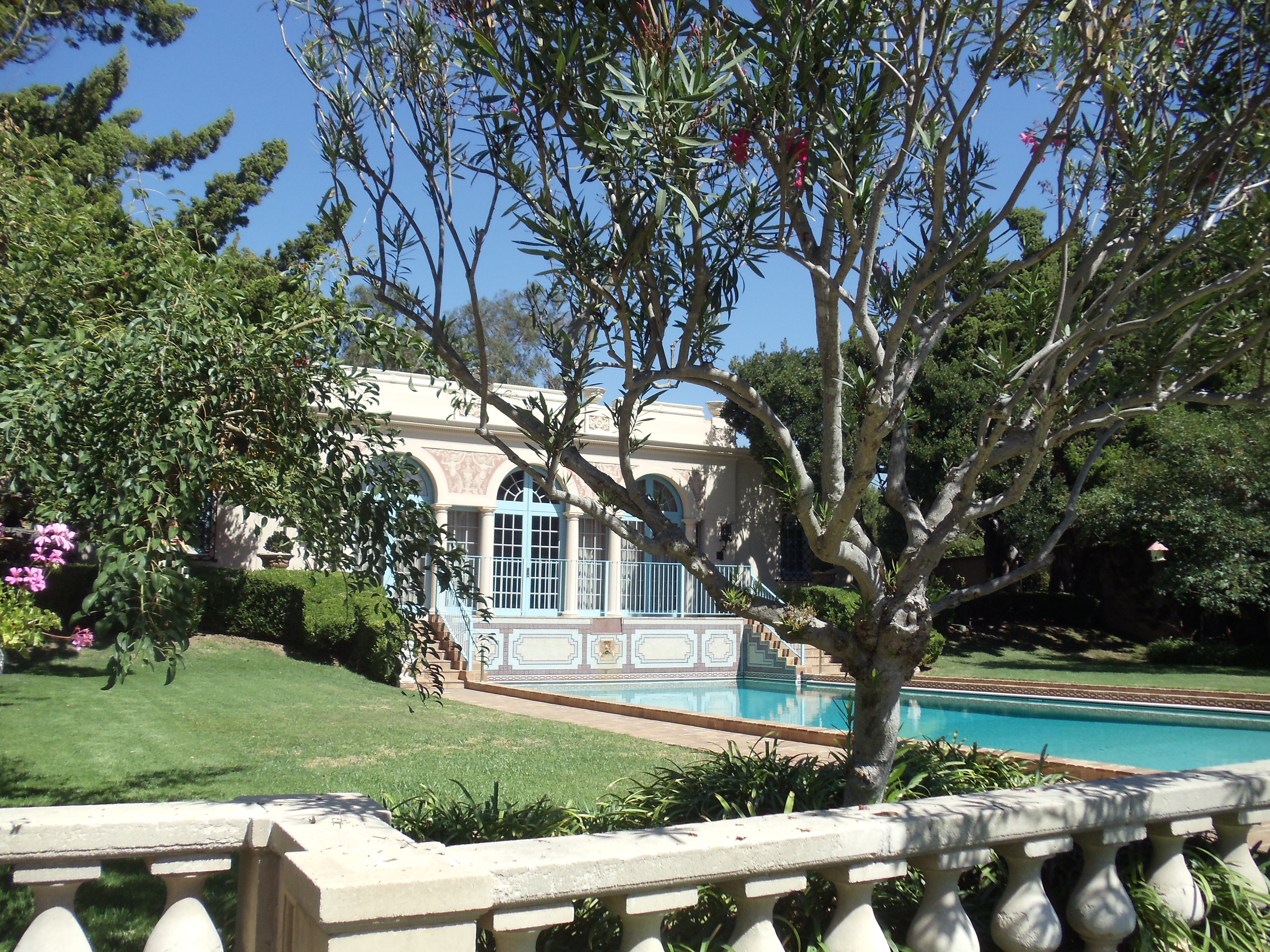
Pool and pool house

The Virginia Robinson Gardens range in style and plant type from Italian Renaissance Mediterranean to Tropical Oceanea. The estate has five distinctive gardens:

- The Italian Renaissance Terrace Garden, with views of mature specimen trees and the Citrus Terraces. Planted under large magnolia trees are a variety of camellias, gardenias, and azaleas.
- The Formal Mall Garden, with perennial flower borders and rare specimen cycad 'palms'.
- The Rose Garden, with heirloom roses.
- The Kitchen Garden or Potager, with vegetables and an herb garden.
- The Tropical Palm Garden, including a grove of king palms (Archontophoenix cunninghamiana), reportedly the largest in the continental United States. The tropical area also contains gingers, bananas, and plumerias.

== Access ==
The Robinson Gardens are managed by the County of Los Angeles and open to the public for docent tours by advance reservation only. The Friends of Virginia Robinson Gardens support this landmark. It was listed in 1978 on the National Register of Historic Places. Additionally, it holds the status of a California Point of Historical Interest, and is included on the City of Beverly Hills Local Register of Historic Properties.

== See also ==
- National Register of Historic Places listings in Los Angeles County, California
- List of botanical gardens and arboretums in California
