= Anderton Court Shops =

Building in Beverly Hills, California

- U.S. National Register of Historic Places
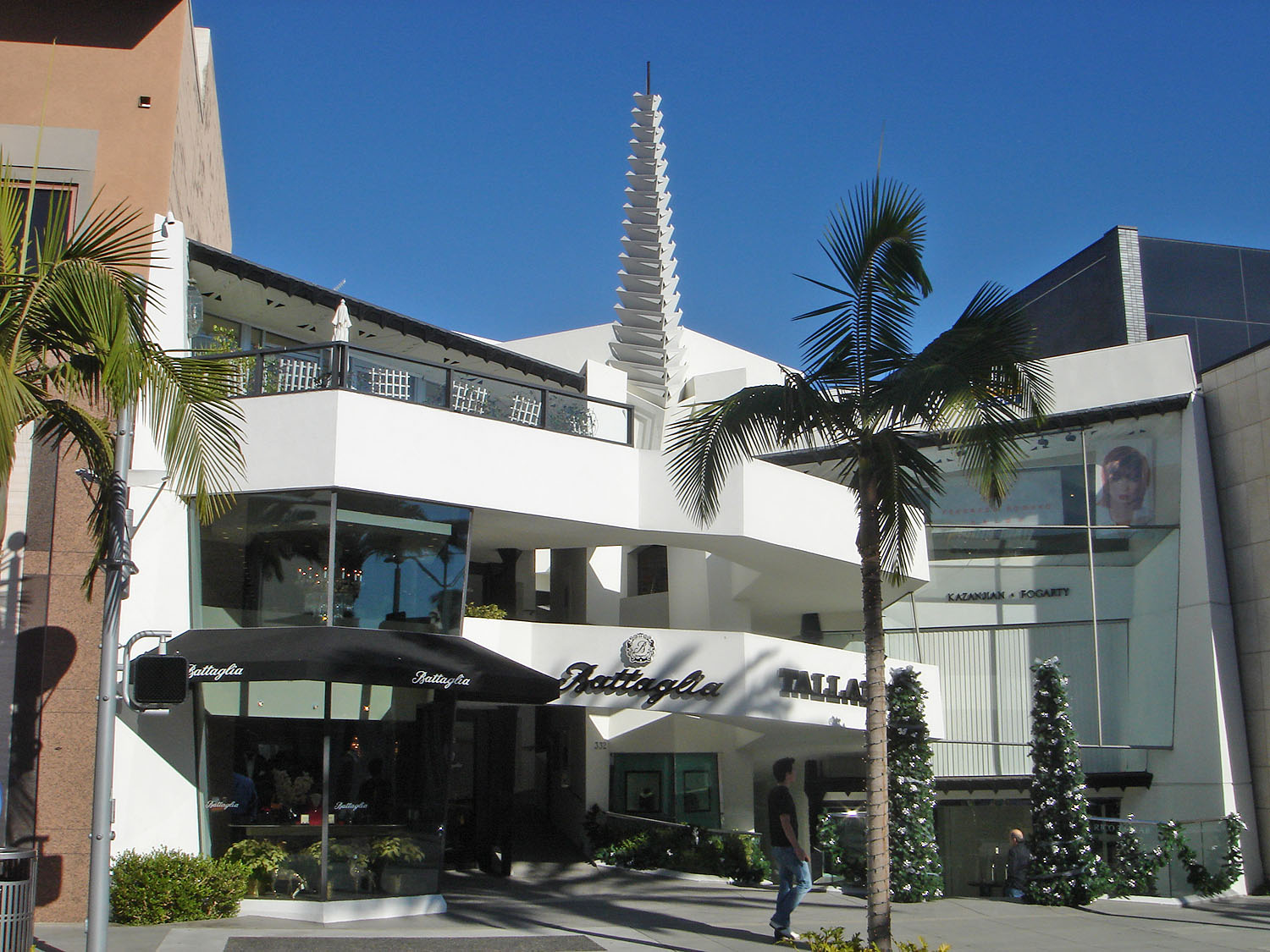

- Location within the Los Angeles metropolitan area
- Location: Beverly Hills, California
- Coordinates: 34°4′6.88″N 118°24′7.33″W
- Built: 1952
- Architect: Frank Lloyd Wright
- Architectural style: Usonian
- NRHP reference No.: 03000987
- Added to NRHP: May 14, 2004

The Anderton Court Shops building was completed in 1952, as Frank Lloyd Wright's final Los Angeles County building. It consisted of a small three-story group of shops on fashionable Rodeo Drive in the downtown section of Beverly Hills, California. The building was restored and renovated in 2024 as a flagship store for Givenchy.

== Design ==
The entrance to all the shops is off of an angular ramp that wraps around an open parallelogram as it leads upward to the shops. Four shops were envisioned with the penthouse space, an apartment. Like the Marin Civic Center, this is another example of a secular Wright building with a "steeple". The inverted "V" front elevation stands out in sharp contrast to its traditional, flat-front urban neighbors.

== History ==
In later years, the space was subdivided into six small shops, three on each side, each staggered a half-floor from one another and offset by the ramp. The facade, which was once light buff with oxidized-copper-color trim, was repainted white with black detailing. A canopy and signage were also added, not consistent with Wright's original design.

The Anderton Court Shops building was added to the National Register of Historic Places on May 14, 2004. The entire building was restored and renovated in 2024 as a flagship store for Givenchy.

== See also ==
- List of Frank Lloyd Wright works
- History of the National Register of Historic Places
- List of National Historic Landmarks by state
- State Historic Preservation Office
- List of Registered Historic Places in Los Angeles County, California
