= Castillo del Lago =

Estate in Hollywood, California. U.S.

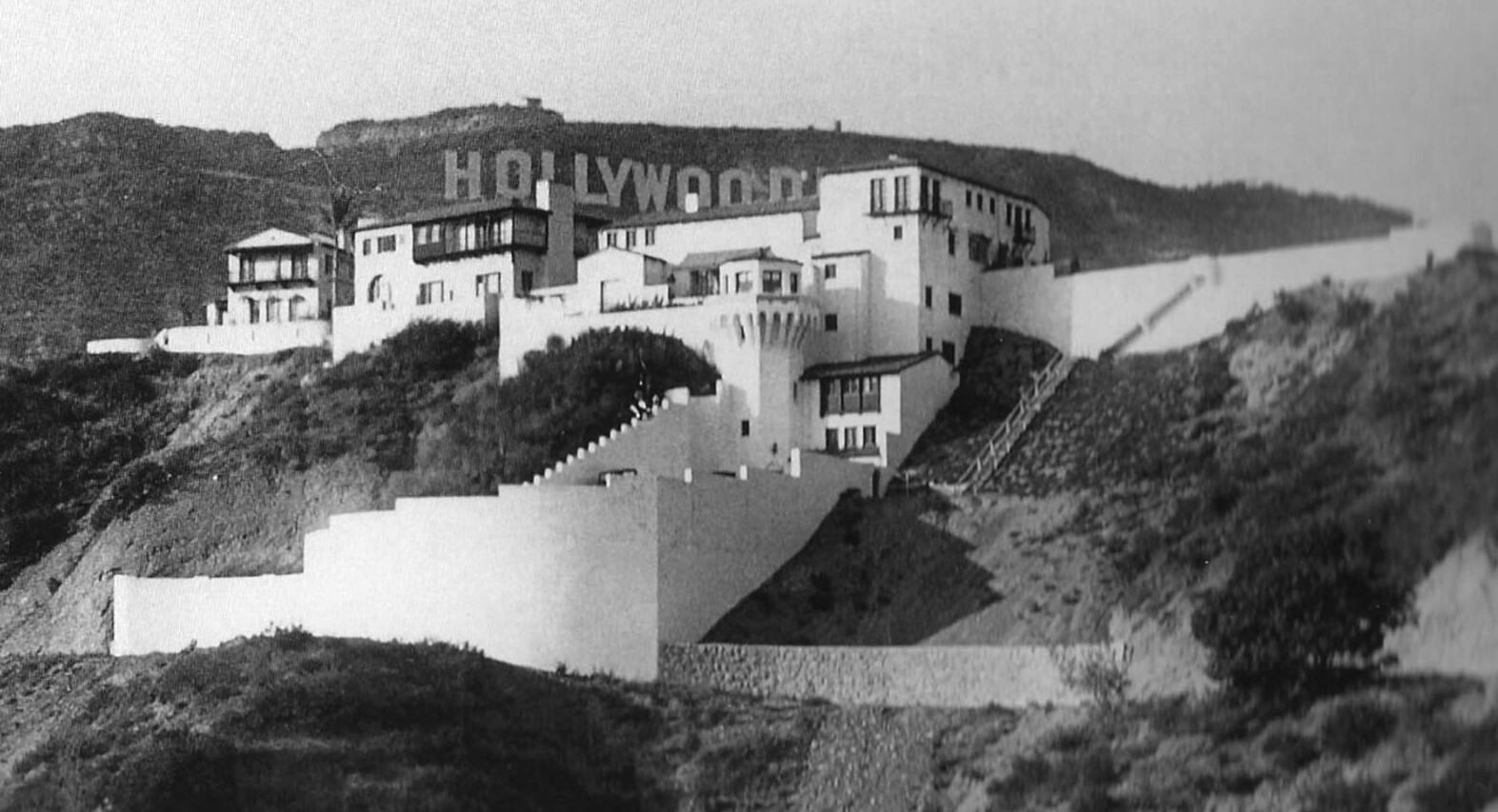
- The estate in front of the Hollywood Sign, 1926
- Interactive map of the Castillo del Lago area

General information
- Type: Single-family estate
- Architectural style: Spanish Colonial Revival / Mediterranean Revival
- Location: 6342 Mulholland Highway, Hollywood, Los Angeles, California, U.S.
- Coordinates: 34°07′32″N 118°19′28″W
- Completed: 1926
- Renovated: 1993—1997, 1997—2009

Technical details
- Floor area: 10,500 square feet (980 m^{2})

Design and construction
- Architect: John DeLario

Castillo del Lago is an estate located at 6342 Mulholland Highway in the Hollywoodland neighborhood of Beachwood Canyon in Hollywood, California.

== History ==
Castillo del Lago was designed by John DeLario, the lead architect in Los Angeles's Hollywoodland tract in the 1920s, and built for Patrick Longden in 1926. Bugsy Siegel leased the house in the late 1930s and used it to run an illegal casino.

Castillo del Lago fell into disrepair in the 1950s, after which it was owned by Baron Patrick de Selys–Longchamps. Selys–Longchamps sold the property to a couple named Willfong, who restored it. Richard Grossman and Lisa Lyons bought the property in 1990. Madonna bought the property for $5 million in 1993 ($11.1 million in 2025), then spent $3 million on renovations. She then sold the property to Joe Pytka for $5.3 million in 1997 ($10.6 million in 2025), who renovated it then listed it for $14.95 million in 2009 and sold it to Leon Max for $7 million in 2010 ($10.3 million in 2025). Max listed the property for $21 million in February 2023 ($22.2 million in 2025), then reduced to $18.9 million later that year.

In 2011, the building was determined to be eligible for historic designation at the national, state, and local levels.

== Architecture and design ==
Castillo del Lago features a Spanish Colonial Revival/Mediterranean Revival design and consists of nine bedroom, six bathroom, and 10,500 square feet (980 m^{2}) of floorspace. It is located on a 3-acre (12,000 m^{2}) hillside property above Lake Hollywood.

The interior features Moorish arches, coffered ceilings, terracotta tiled floors, period tilework, hand-painted details, and a wood-paneled elevator. The primary suite contains two colorfully-tiled bathrooms and a private tower that offers 360-degree views of the mountains and city. The building also has a second tower, accessed from the foyer by a wooden spiral staircase with wrought iron railing. The living room is double-height, the ceiling held up by elaborately painted wooden beams and columned archways; it also features a corner fireplace and rows of french doors leading to a terrace. The building also contains a wine cellar.

The building has been described as "fortress-like" and is considered "one of the most incredible examples of Spanish colonial architecture in southern California."

== Filming location ==
House of the Damned filmed at Castillo del Lago.
