= Wolf's Lair (Los Angeles) =

Estate in Hollywood, California. U.S.

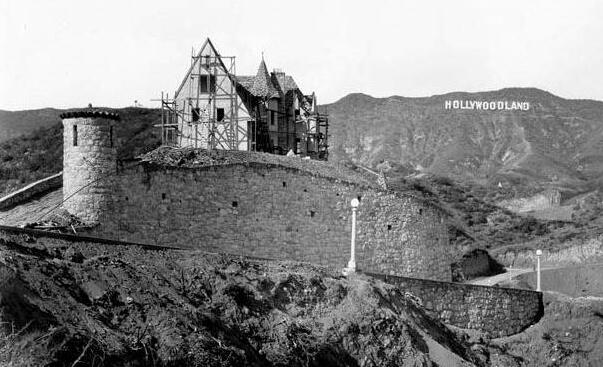
- The estate nearing completion in 1928
- Interactive map of the Wolf's Lair area

General information
- Type: Estate
- Architectural style: Châteauesque
- Location: 2869 N. Durand Drive, Hollywood, California, U.S.
- Coordinates: 34°07′14″N 118°19′29″W
- Named for: Leslie Milton Wolf
- Construction started: 1924 or earlier
- Completed: 1928
- Renovated: 2010–2014

Technical details
- Floor area: 6,500 square feet (600 m^{2})

Design and construction
- Architect: John DeLario

Wolf's Lair is an estate located at 2869 N. Durand Drive in the Hollywoodland neighborhood of Beachwood Canyon in Hollywood, California, United States. Designed in the Châteauesque style by John DeLario for Leslie Milton Wolf, the estate was completed in 1928 and was Wolf's residence until his death in 1972. In subsequent years, the estate saw numerous owners and renters, with notable occupants including Marlon Brando, Debbie Reynolds, and members of The Beatles. The property covers 3.3 acres (13,000 m^{2}) and includes the main house, pool house, gate house, and a guest house designed by John Lautner.

== History ==
Wolf's Lair was designed by John DeLario, the lead architect in Los Angeles's Hollywoodland tract in the 1920s, and built for Hollywood art director and real estate developer Leslie Milton Wolf, whom the estate was named after. Construction began in or before 1924 and was completed in 1928. Wolf lived in the estate until his death in 1972. F. W. Murnau visited the estate in the late 1920s and may have lived in it as well.

Following Wolf's death, Wolf's Lair was made available for rent, with numerous figures in the entertainment industry renting the property, including Marlon Brando, Debbie Reynolds, Burt Reynolds, The Beatles, The Rolling Stones, Shelley Duvall, and Efrem Zimbalist Jr. Real estate broker Bob Crane bought the property c. 1981 and Phillip Barlow bought it in 1996. In 2001, the property was sold to Debra DiMaio for $2.9 million ($5.27 million in 2025); DiMaio sold the property to Jay Faires and Debbie Matenopoulos the following year. Moby bought the property for $3.925 million in 2010 ($5.79 million in 2025), after which he spent an estimated $2 million renovating it and converting the guest house to a recording studio. Moby then sold the property for $12.4 million in 2014 ($16.9 million in 2025), possibly to Banksy or an heir to the Rothschild fortune. The property was listed for $15 million in 2024 ($15.4 million in 2025) but it did not sell.

In 2015, the property was determined to be eligible for historic designation at the national, state, and local levels.

== Architecture and design ==
Wolf's Lair was designed in the Châteauesque style and has been described as "like something out of a fairy tale." The exterior features turrets, juliet balconies, gable windows, mock medieval tracery, a dovecote, an elongated hipped roof, and an irregular roofline, while the interior features coffered ceilings, carved and stenciled beams, and linen-fold paneling.

The building is located on a 3.3-acre (13,000 m^{2}) property that overlooks Lake Hollywood and offers views of the Hollywood Sign, downtown Los Angeles, and the Pacific Ocean. The property is walled and gated and also contains a pool house, gate house, and a guest house designed by John Lautner. In total, the property contains eight bedrooms and 6,500 square feet (600 m^{2}) of living space, including a hidden room that was formerly a tiki bar. The pool is heart-shaped, has a black bottom, and is part of a terrace with a pergola-covered seating area. The grounds also contain private, manicured hiking trails.

== Shoot location ==
Return from Witch Mountain shot at Wolf's Lair and pornography shot at the property's pool. F. W. Murnau also took several nude photos of David Rollins at the property's pool.
