= Spadena House =

Historic building in Beverly Hills, California

- Spadena House, 2011

- Location within Western Los Angeles
- Former names: Willat studio building
- Alternative names: The Witch's House

General information
- Type: Private home
- Architectural style: Storybook
- Location: Beverly Hills, California, 516 Walden Drive; Beverly Hills, CA 90210
- Coordinates: 34°4′8″N 118°24′39″W
- Completed: 1921
- Renovated: 2006–
- Client: Irvin Willat
- Owner: Michael J. Libow

Technical details
- Floor area: 3,500 square feet (330 m^{2})

Design and construction
- Architect: Harry Oliver

The Spadena House, also known as The Witch's House, is a storybook house in Beverly Hills, California. Located on the corner of Walden Drive and Carmelita Avenue, it is known for its fanciful, intentionally dilapidated design, and is a landmark included on tours of the area.

== History ==
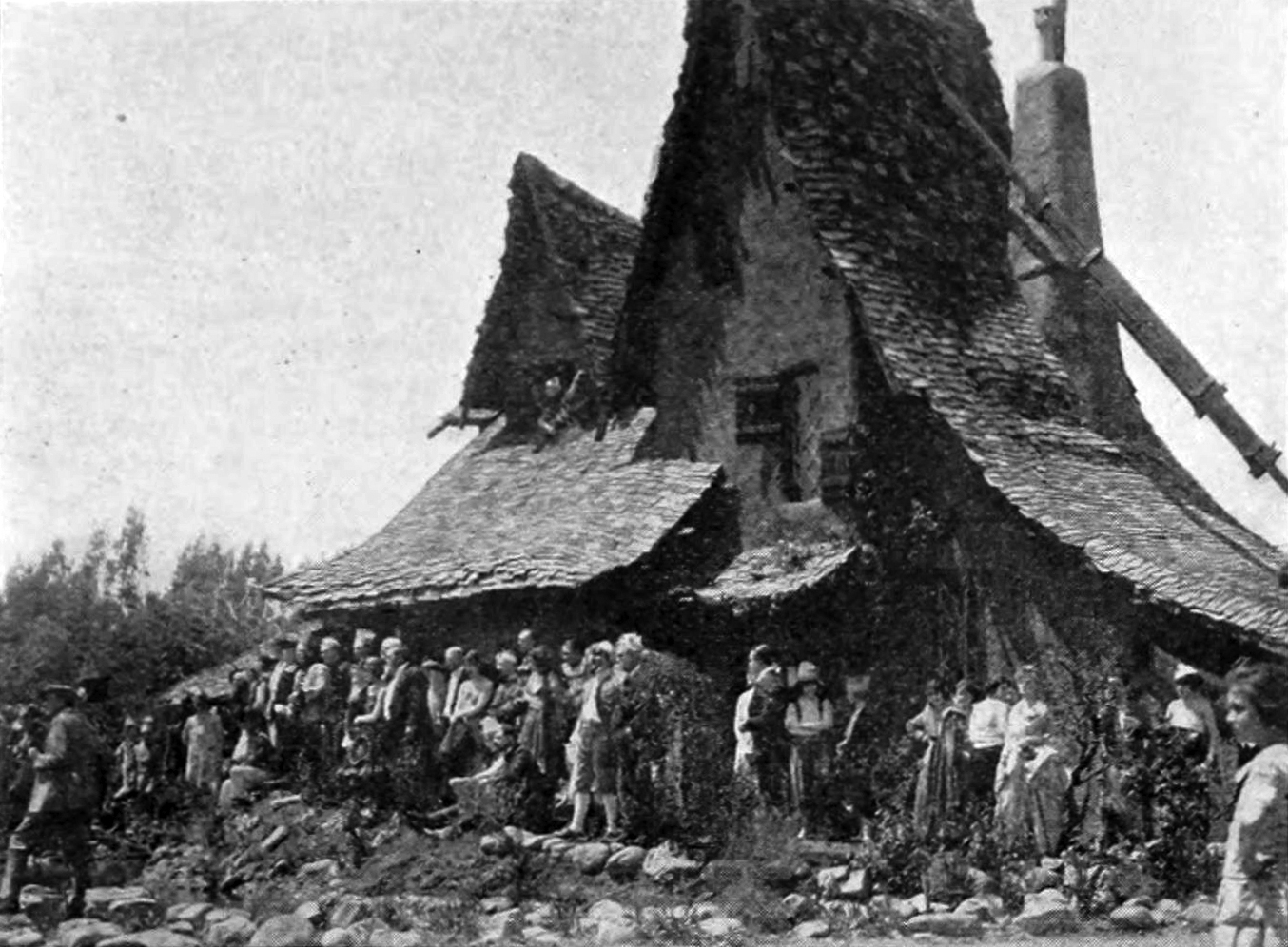
The house, when it was the Irvin W. Willat Studio in Culver City c. 1921

The house was designed by Hollywood art director Harry Oliver, who went on to play a major role in Storybook architecture. Oliver was a Hollywood art director who worked on more than 30 films between 1919 and 1938 as art director, art department, and set decorator. It was originally built in 1921 to serve as the offices and dressing rooms for Irvin Willat's film studio in Culver City, and was moved to its present location in 1926. The converted private home, with its pointy, lopsided roof, tiny windows and stucco with a distressed paint job were then surrounded by an intentionally overgrown English-style garden and a moat-like pond.

The first residents of the 3,500 square feet (330 m^{2}) home, the Spadena family, lent the house their name. A second family moved in and renovated the interior in the 1960s, making some exterior alterations including a skylight visible from certain angles. The moat began leaking under the second family's ownership and they filled it with soil, and planted a garden. By the time the house came on the market again in 1997, it had fallen into disrepair. Because of the value of its prime location, it was unable to immediately find a buyer uninterested in a teardown of the property. Consequently, Michael Libow, a real estate agent, who did not want to see the home demolished, purchased it and began a gradual renovation, utilizing the designs of Production Designer Nelson Coates. After tall, black fencing was initially placed around the lot, the owner received hate mail from people who thought he was going to tear it down. Relief came to all when Libow restored and enhanced the original vision of Oliver. The home is now listed as protected Landmark Number 8 in the City of Beverly Hills.

== Legacy ==
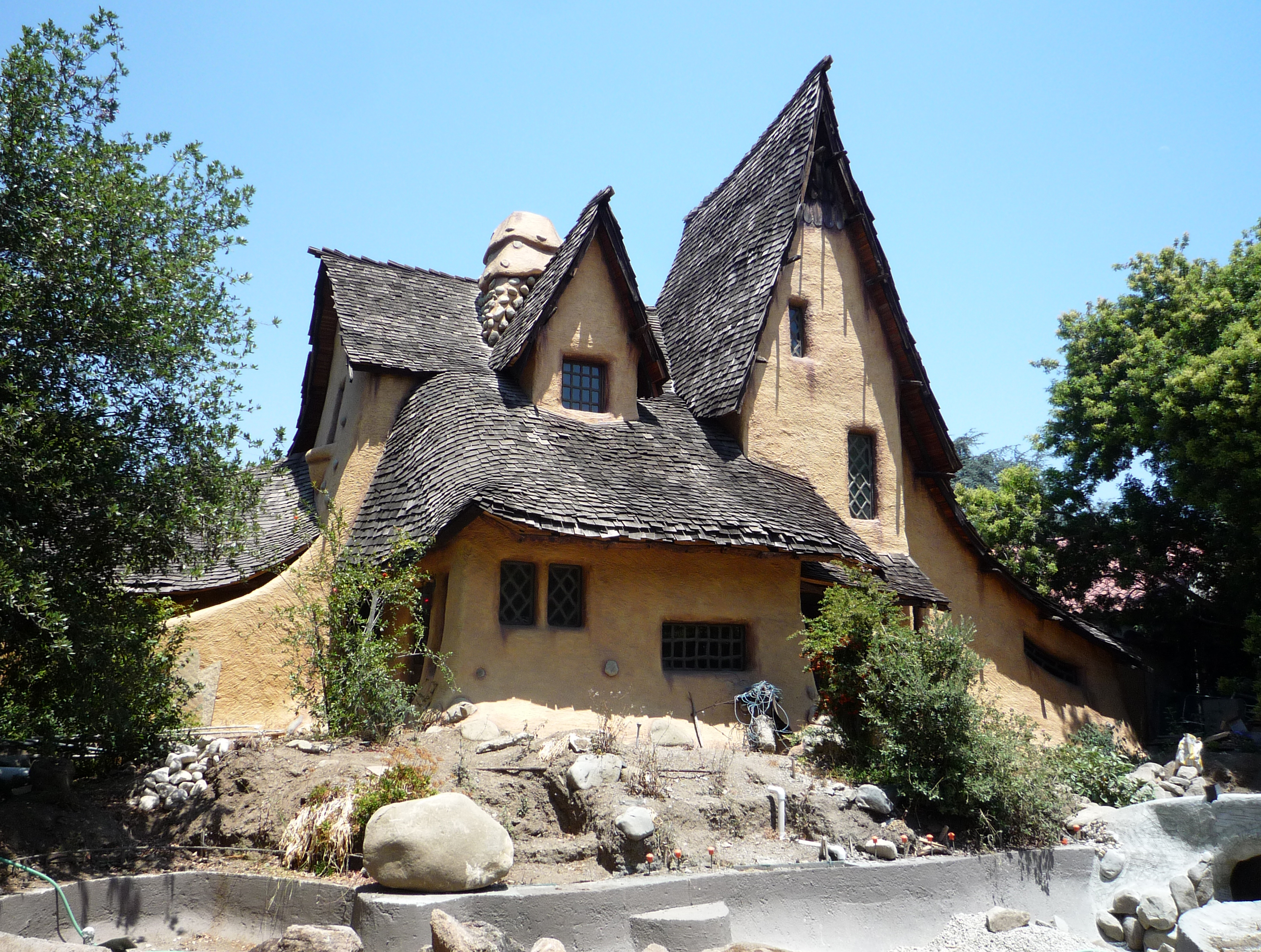
The house under renovation in 2009

Architect Charles Willard Moore once described the building as the "quintessential Hansel and Gretel house." The residence appears in movies including 1995's Clueless.

The home has been called a precursor to Walt Disney's concept of Imagineering, whereby stage sets become fully realized environments.
