= List of United States tornadoes from July to September 2026 =

United States tornadoes from July to September 2026
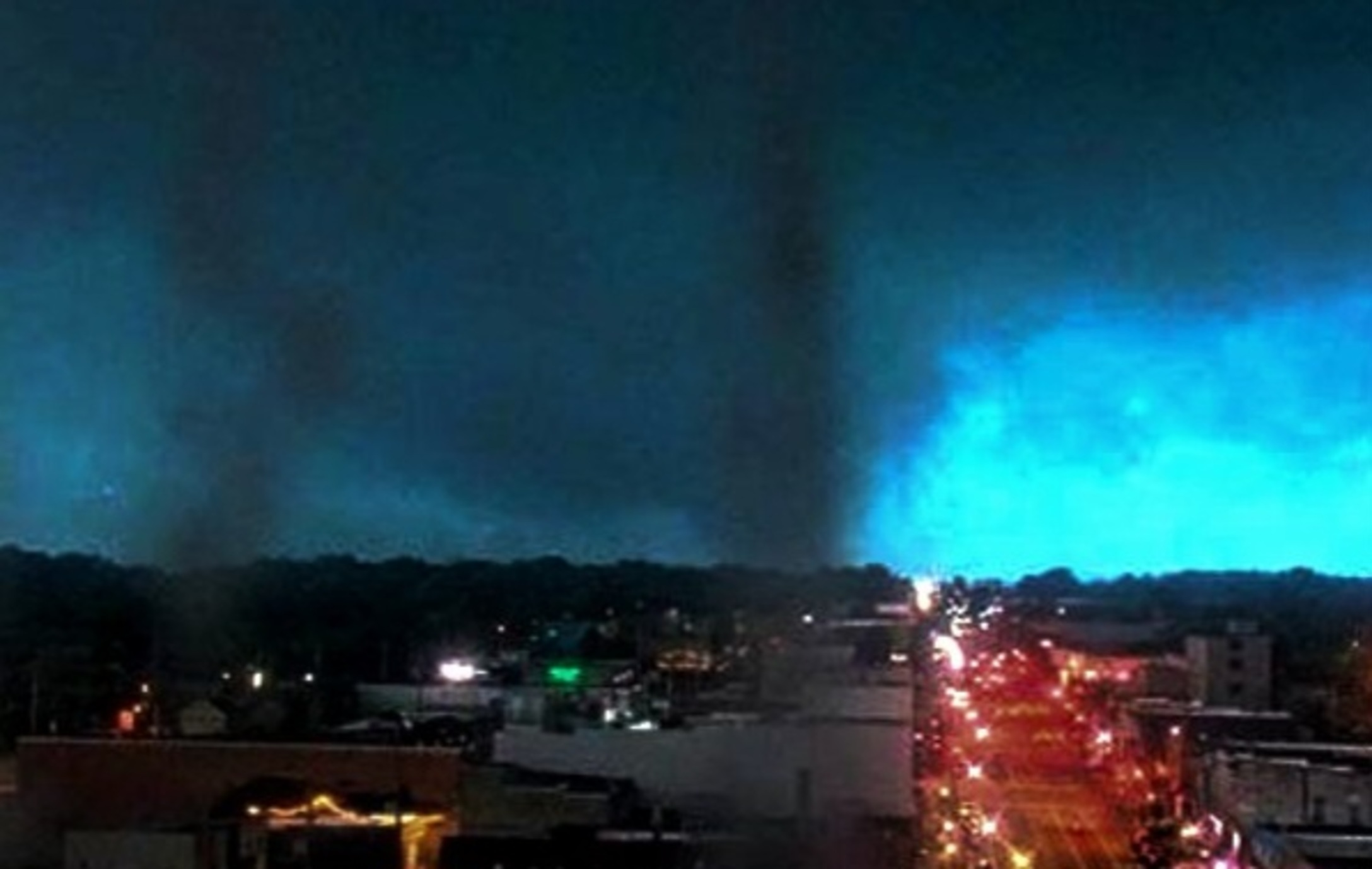
- Clockwise from top: A large EF3 tornado in Appleton, Wisconsin, on July 27 as captured by a skycam; Significant tree damage near Fruit Heights, Utah, following a large EF2 tornado on September 18; A security camera shot of a EF1 tornado near Bruceville, Indiana, on August 12
- Timespan: July 1–September 30
- Maximum rated tornado: EF3 tornado: Menasha, Wisconsin on July 27
- Tornadoes: ~265
- Fatalities: 0
- Injuries: 53

This page documents all tornadoes confirmed by various weather forecast offices of the National Weather Service in the United States from July to September 2026. On average, there are 119 confirmed tornadoes in July, 81 in August, and 66 in September.

In July, the northern states near the Canadian border are most favored for tornadoes, including the Upper Midwest, the Great Lakes and the Northeastern states, due to the positioning of the summertime jet stream. Summer thunderstorms and tropical activity can also result in (mostly weak) tornado activity in the Florida Peninsula. Similar to July, the northern states nearer the Canadian border are most favored for tornadoes in August, including the Upper Midwest, the Great Lakes, and the Northeastern states, due to the positioning of the summertime jet stream. In addition, there can also be occasional increases in the southern and eastern United States as a result of tornadoes from landfalling tropical cyclones should such occur. Tornadic activity in September is most often associated with landfalling tropical cyclones, particularly in the Southern United States. In years with no tropical cyclone landfalls, tornadic activity can be very sparse, as the stronger mid-latitude cyclones most often associated with the cold season are rarer.

July finished with a slightly above-average count of 129 confirmed tornadoes, with a continued trend of elevated activity in the Midwest. August finished slightly above average, with 91 confirmed tornadoes even with the absence of tropical activity. Much of the activity for August took place in two different outbreaks on August 11 and August 20, respectively. September finished well below average with 45 confirmed tornadoes, with much of the activity centered on two different outbreaks, one at the beginning of the month from September 1–3, and the other at the end from September 29–30.

== July ==
Confirmed tornadoes by Enhanced Fujita rating
EFU	EF0	EF1	EF2	EF3	EF4	EF5	Total
26	56	39	7	1	0	0	129

=== July 1 event ===
List of confirmed tornadoes – Wednesday, July 1, 2026 (Note: All dates are based on the local time zone where the tornado touched down; however, all times are in Coordinated Universal Time for consistency.)
EF#	Location	County / Parish	State	Start Coord.	Time (UTC)	Path length	Max width
EF0	S of Stacyville	Mitchell	IA	43.4112°N 92.7934°W	00:37–00:38	0.95 mi (1.53 km)	40 yd (37 m)
EF0	This very brief tornado damaged a grove of trees.						
EF0	W of Oto	Woodbury	IA	42.2734°N 95.9037°W	01:02–01:08	2.89 mi (4.65 km)	50 yd (46 m)
EF0	This intermittent tornado touched down just southwest of Oto near Iowa 31 and moved north through a cemetery, causing minor tree damage and toppling several old headstones. It briefly lifted before touching down again farther north, where it damaged trees at a farmstead and an outbuilding. The tornado dissipated shortly afterward.						
EF1	White Creek	Adams	WI	43.829°N 89.8534°W	04:08–04:09	0.57 mi (0.92 km)	50 yd (46 m)
EF1	This tornado damaged trees and mobile homes.						

=== July 2 event ===
List of confirmed tornadoes – Thursday, July 2, 2026
EF#	Location	County / Parish	State	Start Coord.	Time (UTC)	Path length	Max width
EFU	S of Gann Valley to W of Spring Valley Colony	Buffalo, Jerauld	SD	43.98°N 98.99°W	19:49–20:14	5.41 mi (8.71 km)	20 yd (18 m)
EFU	This tornado initially struck a gravel pit, tossing several machinery, grain, and livestock trailers in different directions, with one livestock trailer displaced approximately 150 yd (140 m) from its original location. Additional damage included flattened cornstalks and numerous empty 1,000-gallon plastic barrels that were carried between a quarter and half a mile. Despite the damage, the tornado was rated EFU.						
EFU	NE of Spring Valley Colony	Jerauld	SD	44.07°N 98.845°W	20:30–20:35	1.79 mi (2.88 km)	20 yd (18 m)
EFU	Multiple storm chasers observed a tornado that tracked entirely through fields. No damage occurred.						
EF1	Huron	Beadle	SD	44.3697°N 98.2237°W	21:56–22:01	2.48 mi (3.99 km)	75 yd (69 m)
EF1	This tornado damaged an outbuilding and inflicted minor tree damage as it moved through Huron.						
EFU	SW of Willow Lake	Clark	SD	44.59°N 97.71°W	22:30–22:32	0.7 mi (1.1 km)	1 yd (0.91 m)
EFU	A tornado touched down over an open field and caused no damage.						
EF0	Eastern Fort Myers	Lee	FL	26.616°N 81.8002°W	23:00–23:02	0.39 mi (0.63 km)	25 yd (23 m)
EF0	This landspout tossed a few shopping carts in a Target parking lot. Some tree foliage was also lightly damaged.						

=== July 3 event ===
List of confirmed tornadoes – Friday, July 3, 2026
EF#	Location	County / Parish	State	Start Coord.	Time (UTC)	Path length	Max width
EFU	SE of Torrington	Goshen	WY	42.0151°N 104.141°W	21:59–22:03	1.8 mi (2.9 km)	10 yd (9.1 m)
EFU	A landspout crossed US 26 and inflicted no damage.						
EF0	NW of Hubbell	Thayer	NE	40.06°N 97.55°W	00:02–00:04	2.42 mi (3.89 km)	
EF0	An EF0 tornado was confirmed by NWS Hastings. Preliminary information.						

=== July 4 event ===
List of confirmed tornadoes – Saturday, July 4, 2026
EF#	Location	County / Parish	State	Start Coord.	Time (UTC)	Path length	Max width
EFU	ESE of Everly	Clay	IA	43.1525°N 95.2924°W	16:11–16:12	0.09 mi (0.14 km)	10 yd (9.1 m)
EFU	This landspout was recorded by a trained spotter. No damage occurred.						
EFU	E of Paragould	Greene	AR	Unknown	16:44–16:49	Unknown	Unknown
EFU	A landspout was observed over an open field and caused no damage.						
EFU	NNE of Cornell	Clay	IA	42.9809°N 95.1281°W	18:10–18:11	0.14 mi (0.23 km)	10 yd (9.1 m)
EFU	Local law enforcement observed a tornado that remained over an open field.						

=== July 5 event ===
List of confirmed tornadoes – Sunday, July 5, 2026
EF#	Location	County / Parish	State	Start Coord.	Time (UTC)	Path length	Max width
EF1	NE of Canfield	Mahoning	OH	41.0558°N 80.7317°W	18:03–18:04	0.58 mi (0.93 km)	300 yd (270 m)
EF1	A tornado initially shredded the tops of trees, throwing debris onto nearby residences before moving southeast across US 62. Farther along its path, numerous trees were toppled or snapped at their bases, including one large tree that fell onto a residence and severely damaged it. The tornado continued southeast, shredding additional treetops before dissipating.						
EF1	WSW of Marysville	Perry	PA	40.3205°N 77.0008°W	23:14–23:17	0.55 mi (0.89 km)	300 yd (270 m)
EF1	Numerous trees were broken off or uprooted.						

=== July 6 event ===
List of confirmed tornadoes – Monday, July 6, 2026
EF#	Location	County / Parish	State	Start Coord.	Time (UTC)	Path length	Max width
EF0	Western Lake Bronson	Kittson	MN	48.7313°N 96.6693°W	19:45–19:46	0.07 mi (0.11 km)	20 yd (18 m)
EF0	A very brief tornado tipped over a horse trailer.						
EFU	SSW of Joseph City	Navajo	AZ	34.95°N 110.35°W	00:40–00:45	0.18 mi (0.29 km)	50 yd (46 m)
EFU	This landspout was observed just south of I-40 and remained over open terrain.						
EF2	N of Detroit Lakes	Becker	MN	46.8879°N 95.9176°W	00:47–01:00	9.86 mi (15.87 km)	1,100 yd (1,000 m)
EF2	This strong tornado developed northwest of Wheeler Lake and tracked east across the lake, damaging the roofs of several homes and snapping large oak and poplar trees along its western shore. It widened to approximately half a mile as it approached the western shore of Big Floyd Lake, where several anchored garages collapsed and other garages and outbuildings were completely swept away in the Oakland Beach neighborhood. Widespread roof and tree damage also occurred, and a horse trailer was lofted and carried approximately 220 yd (200 m) from its stables. The tornado continued across Big Floyd Lake, causing additional roof and tree damage along its eastern shore before crossing a county highway. The tornado continued to do tree and outbuilding damage before eventually dissipating. One person was directly injured by the tornado, another was injured during cleanup, and one was injured with an unknown cause.						
EF0	SW of Tenney to SW of Tintah	Traverse	MN	46.01°N 96.51°W	02:14–02:16	5.33 mi (8.58 km)	100 yd (91 m)
EF0	A tornado remained over agricultural lands, inflicting no damage.						

=== July 7 event ===
List of confirmed tornadoes – Tuesday, July 7, 2026
EF#	Location	County / Parish	State	Start Coord.	Time (UTC)	Path length	Max width
EFU	S of Hillsdale	Laramie	WY	41.19°N 104.3985°W	19:12–19:22	2.77 mi (4.46 km)	50 yd (46 m)
EFU	This dusty landspout caused no damage.						
EFU	WSW of Albin (1st tornado)	Laramie	WY	41.3945°N 104.3542°W	19:38–19:50	5.24 mi (8.43 km)	20 yd (18 m)
EFU	A tall and widely observed landspout caused no damage.						
EFU	WSW of Albin (2nd tornado)	Laramie	WY	41.4032°N 104.305°W	19:39–19:42	0.83 mi (1.34 km)	20 yd (18 m)
EFU	A landspout briefly touched down while the 1938 UTC landspout was occurring before quickly dissipating. No damage occurred.						

=== July 9 event ===
List of confirmed tornadoes – Thursday, July 9, 2026
EF#	Location	County / Parish	State	Start Coord.	Time (UTC)	Path length	Max width
EF1	W of Jetson	Butler	KY	37.2584°N 86.5653°W	02:54–02:57	2.12 mi (3.41 km)	40 yd (37 m)
EF1	A tornado initially struck a home, lifting its attached front porch and collapsing a carport roof onto two parked vehicles. It then intermittently touched down across mostly open fields, breaking tree branches before striking a barn and peeling off its roof, with debris scattered to the east-southeast. The tornado then turned southeast, heavily damaging another barn and snapping a large cedar tree before dissipating.						
EF0	Eastern Rolla	Phelps	MO	37.9552°N 91.7538°W	03:02-03:03	0.72 mi (1.16 km)	200 yd (180 m)
EF0	A high-end EF0 tornado moved through Rolla, damaging trees and the roofs of businesses.						

=== July 10 event ===
List of confirmed tornadoes – Friday, July 10, 2026
EF#	Location	County / Parish	State	Start Coord.	Time (UTC)	Path length	Max width
EFU	SW of Osco	Henry	IL	41.35°N 90.28°W	17:40–17:41	0.01 mi (0.016 km)	10 yd (9.1 m)
EFU	A landspout caused no damage.						
EFU	NE of Saybrook	McLean	IL	40.4548°N 88.4977°W	21:40–21:41	0.25 mi (0.40 km)	20 yd (18 m)
EFU	A tornado tracked through a field, flattening corn.						
EF1	NNE of Casar to NW of Vale	Cleveland, Lincoln, Catawba	NC	35.5544°N 81.5895°W	22:48–23:02	7.48 mi (12.04 km)	150 yd (140 m)
EF1	This tornado touched down and tracked eastward, initially uprooting and snapping several large pine trees. The most significant damage occurred farther east, where numerous trees were snapped or uprooted, several homes sustained mostly minor damage, and an attached porch was displaced several feet from a manufactured home. A camper was also overturned, injuring its occupant. The tornado continued into northwestern Lincoln County, producing sporadic tree damage near NC 10 before dissipating just north of the Lincoln–Catawba county line.						

=== July 11 event ===
List of confirmed tornadoes – Saturday, July 11, 2026
EF#	Location	County / Parish	State	Start Coord.	Time (UTC)	Path length	Max width
EFU	W of Waterloo	Monroe	IL	38.3284°N 90.3046°W	21:44–21:45	0.57 mi (0.92 km)	10 yd (9.1 m)
EFU	A waterspout occurred and remained over Moredock Lake.						

=== July 12 event ===
List of confirmed tornadoes – Sunday, July 12, 2026
EF#	Location	County / Parish	State	Start Coord.	Time (UTC)	Path length	Max width
EFU	NE of Lake Tanglewood (1st tornado)	Randall	TX	35.1°N 101.76°W	19:45	Unknown	Unknown
EFU	This landspout briefly and simultaneously occurred with another landspout. No damage occurred.						
EFU	NE of Lake Tanglewood (2nd tornado)	Randall	TX	35.1°N 101.76°W	19:45	Unknown	Unknown
EFU	A landspout occurred alongside the previous landspout and caused no damage.						

=== July 15 event ===
List of confirmed tornadoes – Wednesday, July 15, 2026
EF#	Location	County / Parish	State	Start Coord.	Time (UTC)	Path length	Max width
EF0	San Antonio	Bexar	TX	29.4326°N 98.4709°W	10:20–10:21	0.3 mi (0.48 km)	30 yd (27 m)
EF0	A weak tornado was captured by a security camera. A fence was blown down, a small portion of a tin roof was peeled back, and the brick facade of one building collapsed.						
EF1	Northwestern San Antonio	Bexar	TX	29.56°N 98.61°W	12:44–12:52	3.95 mi (6.36 km)	200 yd (180 m)
EF1	This tornado touched down southwest of the I-10 and Loop 1604 interchange, initially uprooting a large tree and damaging several others as it tracked northward. The tornado strengthened as it struck an apartment complex, removing the south-facing portion of an apartment building's roof. Continuing north-northeast across Loop 1604, the tornado caused significant tree damage in the Leon Creek Greenway and surrounding areas before crossing I-10 into a shopping center. Several businesses sustained roof damage and had windows blown out before the tornado weakened and dissipated just north of the shopping center.						
EF0	S of China Grove	Bexar	TX	29.3399°N 98.3337°W	21:25–21:26	0.12 mi (0.19 km)	30 yd (27 m)
EF0	A fence was blown down.						

=== July 16 event ===
List of confirmed tornadoes – Thursday, July 16, 2026
EF#	Location	County / Parish	State	Start Coord.	Time (UTC)	Path length	Max width
EF1	Uvalde Estates	Uvalde	TX	29.1665°N 99.8449°W	07:58–07:59	0.05 mi (0.080 km)	50 yd (46 m)
EF1	One power pole was snapped, another was left leaning, and tree limbs were snapped.						
EF0	E of Camp Wood	Real	TX	29.647°N 99.9516°W	11:40–11:42	0.82 mi (1.32 km)	50 yd (46 m)
EF0	A weak tornado damaged vegetation and snapped tree branches. This is only the third documented tornado in Real County since reliable records began in 1950 and the first since 1995.						
EFU	NW of Knox	Pierce, Benson	ND	48.371°N 99.74°W	01:08–01:10	0.9 mi (1.4 km)	30 yd (27 m)
EFU	A thin tornado caused no damage as it tracked through open fields. This is the first tornado Pierce County has seen since 2011.						
EF0	SW of Maddock	Benson	ND	47.9273°N 99.6572°W	02:04–02:11	1.81 mi (2.91 km)	100 yd (91 m)
EF0	A shelterbelt and barns suffered minor damage.						

=== July 17 event ===
List of confirmed tornadoes – Friday, July 17, 2026
EF#	Location	County / Parish	State	Start Coord.	Time (UTC)	Path length	Max width
EF0	NE of Sebastian	Indian River	FL	29.1665°N 99.8449°W	21:14–21:15	0.1 mi (0.16 km)	50 yd (46 m)
EF0	A weak waterspout moved ashore over a barrier island, damaging some trees. It then moved back offshore over the Atlantic Ocean where it eventually dissipated.						

=== July 18 event ===
List of confirmed tornadoes – Saturday, July 18, 2026
EF#	Location	County / Parish	State	Start Coord.	Time (UTC)	Path length	Max width
EF1	Limestone	Clarion	PA	41.1271°N 79.3287°W	19:54–20:00	1.53 mi (2.46 km)	100 yd (91 m)
EF1	This tornado initially uprooted a large tree along PA 66, causing it to fall onto a house, while several smaller trees were uprooted or had branches snapped. Farther along its path, multiple trees were snapped midway up their trunks, and another large tree was uprooted. The tornado continued east-southeast, snapping additional tree branches and a tree on a hilltop before dissipating.						
EF1	SE of Keating	Centre	PA	41.1509°N 77.8624°W	20:33–20:35	1.04 mi (1.67 km)	250 yd (230 m)
EF1	This high-end EF1 tornado downed or snapped approximately 200 trees within heavily wooded areas.						
EF0	NE of Punxsutawney	Jefferson	PA	40.957°N 78.9593°W	20:44–20:47	0.22 mi (0.35 km)	75 yd (69 m)
EF0	This brief tornado uprooted small trees at a BMX track.						
EF0	N of Latrobe	Westmoreland	PA	40.3348°N 79.3835°W	20:51–20:54	0.62 mi (1.00 km)	100 yd (91 m)
EF0	A weak tornado caused minor damage.						
EF0	SSE of Derry	Westmoreland	PA	40.3065°N 79.2945°W	21:08–21:12	1.73 mi (2.78 km)	100 yd (91 m)
EF0	A tornado caused sporadic damage to trees.						
EF2	N of Jennerstown	Somerset	PA	40.2404°N 79.0756°W	21:38–21:41	0.72 mi (1.16 km)	100 yd (91 m)
EF2	This strong tornado snapped or uprooted hundreds of trees.						
EFU	NW of Lorenzo	Crosby	TX	33.701°N 101.571°W	22:01–22:03	Unknown	Unknown
EFU	An off-duty NWS employee observed a landspout. No damage is known to have occurred.						
EF1	SSW of Sanford, NY to Hale Eddy to ENE of Hancock, NY	Broome (NY), Wayne (PA), Delaware (NY)	NY, PA	42.08°N 75.52°W	22:12–22:31	16.86 mi (27.13 km)	300 yd (270 m)
EF1	This tornado touched down and produced minor damage by snapping and uprooting trees, slightly damaging an old barn, and lifting a gazebo into a pond. It strengthened to its peak intensity as it approached NY 41, snapping and uprooting numerous trees and bringing down power lines. After crossing Oquaga Creek, the tornado continued causing significant tree damage, including a tree that fell onto a vehicle, while a home sustained damage to its metal skirting. The tornado weakened as it tracked southeast through hilly terrain, producing sporadic tree damage before crossing NY 17 and continuing through the Whittacker Swamp State Forest, where numerous trees were snapped or knocked down. It then moved through Hale Eddy, causing minor damage, and briefly crossed the Delaware River into Pennsylvania, where additional trees were damaged. The tornado crossed back into New York and crossed NY 17 again, where it moved through areas north of Hancock, causing significant tree damage at a golf course before crossing the East Branch Delaware River. It subsequently restrengthened in intensity, producing extensive tree damage along the southern riverbank and damaging several outbuildings and residential porches before dissipating as it moved uphill.						
EF0	NE of Hurlock	Dorchester	MD	38.65°N 75.84°W	22:30	0.45 mi (0.72 km)	50 yd (46 m)
EF0	This tornado removed the metal roofing from a transport facility and an adjacent building, along with tractor trailers, also received damage.						
EF1	NE of Morann	Clearfield	PA	40.7995°N 78.359°W	00:16–00:18	1 mi (1.6 km)	400 yd (370 m)
EF1	An intermittent, high-end EF1 tornado snapped several pine trees and caused minor structural damage as it tracked southeast toward PA 153. It continued through wooded areas, producing extensive tree and power line damage and ripping a chimney off a house. Hundreds of trees were snapped or uprooted along the path before the tornado briefly lifted while crossing an open field. The tornado touched down again in another forested area, causing additional extensive damage to trees and power lines before weakening, with damage becoming increasingly sporadic as it crossed Moshannon Creek and dissipated.						
EF0	NW of Bald Eagle	Blair	PA	40.7342°N 78.2321°W	00:29–00:30	0.37 mi (0.60 km)	150 yd (140 m)
EF0	Minor tree damage occurred.						
EF2	NNE of Spruce Creek	Huntingdon	PA	40.6551°N 78.116°W	00:43–00:45	0.53 mi (0.85 km)	500 yd (460 m)
EF2	A brief but strong tornado initially caused minor crop damage before partially removing the roof of a silo, tearing half the roof off a barn, and damaging the roof of another nearby barn. It continued southeast along Warriors Mark Run, producing extensive tree damage, with hundreds of trees snapped or uprooted along its path. One large tree fell onto and damaged a cabin. The tornado then turned east-southeast toward Camp Kanesatake before dissipating near the northern edge of the camp.						

=== July 20 event ===
List of confirmed tornadoes – Monday, July 20, 2026
EF#	Location	County / Parish	State	Start Coord.	Time (UTC)	Path length	Max width
EF1	Chapin	Franklin	IA	42.83°N 93.22°W	20:35	0.38 mi (0.61 km)	25 yd (23 m)
EF1	This high-end EF1 tornado unroofed a home and caused crop convergence patterns in corn fields.						
EF1	NW to W of Austinville	Butler	IA	42.62°N 93.01°W	20:49–20:55	3.10 mi (4.99 km)	25 yd (23 m)
EF1	This tornado destroyed a newly built outbuilding and caused crop convergence patterns in fields.						
EF1	WSW to S of Aplington	Butler, Grundy	IA	42.58°N 92.92°W	20:56–21:00	4.42 mi (7.11 km)	25 yd (23 m)
EF1	This tornado destroyed the walls of a few outbuildings.						
EFU	NW of Fern	Grundy	IA	42.51°N 92.89°W	21:00–21:02	1.99 mi (3.20 km)	
EFU	This tornado left convergent patterns in multiple fields along its path.						
EFU	E of Harvey	Marquette	MI	46.5012°N 87.1733°W	22:25–22:35	2.77 mi (4.46 km)	25 yd (23 m)
EFU	A waterspout moved ashore from Lake Superior and caused no damage.						
EF1	ESE of Carney	Menominee	MI	45.5497°N 87.3647°W	23:47–23:49	0.14 mi (0.23 km)	35 yd (32 m)
EF1	Several large pine trees were snapped or uprooted.						
EF0	SE of Conception to W of Weaver	Wabasha	MN	44.2255°N 92.0546°W	23:48–23:54	2.28 mi (3.67 km)	20 yd (18 m)
EF0	This tornado blown down an outbuilding and tipped over a trailer at a farmstead.						
EF1	SE of Island View	Delta	MI	45.5682°N 87.2549°W	23:58–00:01	0.3 mi (0.48 km)	25 yd (23 m)
EF1	Multiple trees were damaged.						
EFU	S of Little Chicago	Marathon	WI	45.06°N 89.88°W	00:03–00:07	2 mi (3.2 km)	20 yd (18 m)
EFU	A storm chaser reported a tornado. No damage was found.						
EF0	E of Whitehall	Trempealeau	WI	44.3648°N 91.2204°W	00:11–00:14	0.95 mi (1.53 km)	20 yd (18 m)
EF0	A TDS was observed on radar but no damage was found.						
EF0	E of Unity to ENE of Stratford	Marathon	WI	44.84°N 90.19°W	00:15–00:44	8.18 mi (13.16 km)	25 yd (23 m)
EF0	A weak tornado affected an outdoor agricultural event, inflicting minor damage to a tent and a few portable restrooms.						
EF0	SW of Black River Falls	Jackson	WI	44.2677°N 90.9234°W	00:47–00:53	2.3 mi (3.7 km)	50 yd (46 m)
EF0	This tornado was observed on a webcam. It moved through forested areas and caused no observable damage.						
EF0	SE of Phlox to N of Neopit	Menominee	WI	45.02°N 88.98°W	00:57–01:10	7.62 mi (12.26 km)	20 yd (18 m)
EF0	This tornado crossed WIS 47 and damaged some trees.						
EFU	SE of Elderon to SE of Tigerton	Shawano	WI	44.75°N 89.17°W	01:26–01:40	8.79 mi (14.15 km)	20 yd (18 m)
EFU	A tornado was reported and caused no damage.						

=== July 21 event ===
List of confirmed tornadoes – Tuesday, July 21, 2026
EF#	Location	County / Parish	State	Start Coord.	Time (UTC)	Path length	Max width
EF2	SW of Thursday	Ritchie	WV	39.038°N 81.084°W	17:36–17:44	2.58 mi (4.15 km)	800 yd (730 m)
EF2	This strong tornado snapped multiple large trees and did minor damage to the roof of a house.						
EF1	N of Chenango Forks to Greene	Broome, Chenango	NY	42.3°N 75.87°W	17:40–18:00	6.54 mi (10.53 km)	200 yd (180 m)
EF1	A tornado touched down in a wooded area within Barker, producing scattered snapped and uprooted trees. The tornado caused significantly greater tree and power line damage further east, snapping or uprooting several dozen hardwood and softwood trees and producing its most severe damage at a farm west of Greene. It maintained its intensity as it moved into portions of the village, causing additional damage to wooded areas before weakening after crossing NY 41 and lifting.						
EF0	NW of Lake Ariel	Wayne	PA	41.4961°N 75.4526°W	17:41–17:44	2.32 mi (3.73 km)	100 yd (91 m)
EF0	This tornado touched down, uprooting several mature apple trees in an orchard and causing siding and soffit damage to a couple of homes. A hunting shed was destroyed, smaller tree branches were scattered across a field, and a chair was lofted nearly a quarter of a mile. The tornado weakened as it crossed Lake Quinn and continued beyond the lake before dissipating shortly afterward.						
EF1	SSE of Greene to WNW of Afton	Chenango	NY	42.2685°N 75.725°W	17:45–17:52	4.64 mi (7.47 km)	100 yd (91 m)
EF1	This tornado developed near a rural intersection and tracked along a narrow path for several miles, causing its most significant damage at a farm where a hay barn lost its roof and most of its walls. Debris was scattered across the area and wrapped around a telephone pole, with one section of roofing thrown at least 100 yd (91 m). Several other outbuildings lost roofing material, the top of a silo was removed, and a section of cinder-block wall collapsed. The tornado also uprooted numerous trees before weakening near NY 235, where the damage path became discontinuous and eventually ended.						
EF1	Stanhope	Morris, Sussex	NJ	40.9069°N 74.723°W	18:00–18:05	1.4 mi (2.3 km)	250 yd (230 m)
EF1	This tornado caused extensive tree damage near the interchange of I-80 and US 206, with the damage path continuing toward Stanhope. The tornado produced intermittent tree damage through the town before reaching the southern shore of Lake Musconetcong, where additional trees were damaged near several residences. One home lost some roof shingles, while another sustained gutter damage just before the tornado dissipated.						
EF1	Southeastern Lower Berkshire Valley	Morris	NJ	40.9042°N 74.6103°W	18:15–18:17	0.61 mi (0.98 km)	250 yd (230 m)
EF1	This high-end EF1 tornado touched down just south of I-80, uprooting several trees before tracking northeast across the interstate, where a pine tree was snapped about halfway up its trunk. The tornado continued into a residential neighborhood, damaging numerous trees and utility wires, including uprooting a large, healthy hardwood tree where it eventually lifted.						
EF0	N of Fultonham to SE of Blue Rock	Muskingum	OH	39.8672°N 82.1495°W	18:27–18:47	15.83 mi (25.48 km)	75 yd (69 m)
EF0	A tornado began just north of Fultonham and moved east-southeast through southern Muskingum County, intermittently touching down and causing scattered tree damage. Most of the damage consisted of isolated downed trees and large broken branches, including several trees knocked down in Avondale west of SR 93. Farther east, additional large limbs and several hardwood trees were downed before the tornado produced its final observed damage east of Gaysport, where more large branches were broken.						
EF1	Pine Brook	Morris	NJ	40.8725°N 74.3413°W	18:50–18:51	0.2 mi (0.32 km)	70 yd (64 m)
EF1	A tornado touched down and tracked northeast, producing primarily tree damage along its path. Several large tree branches were snapped, a large tree was uprooted, and a power pole was broken at its base and knocked down. The tornado also removed shingles from a home before dissipating shortly after crossing into another wooded area, just before reaching the Passaic River.						
EF1	SW of Amelia to W of Nicholsville	Clermont	OH	39.0024°N 84.2644°W	18:50–18:57	4.81 mi (7.74 km)	250 yd (230 m)
EF1	This tornado snapped or uprooted several trees and caused moderate roof damage to a home.						
EF0	S of Lees Creek	Clinton	OH	39.415°N 83.6739°W	19:09–19:13	3.33 mi (5.36 km)	75 yd (69 m)
EF0	This tornado uprooted trees, one of which fell onto a home, and flattened crops.						
EF1	SW of South Zanesville to northern Philo	Muskingum	OH	39.8836°N 82.0573°W	19:10–19:21	8.7 mi (14.0 km)	450 yd (410 m)
EF1	This tornado snapped or uprooted hundreds of trees and unroofed an outbuilding.						
EF1	NNW of Sanders to NNE of Corinth	Carroll, Gallatin, Owen, Grant	KY	38.6815°N 84.9637°W	19:12–20:26	26.75 mi (43.05 km)	500 yd (460 m)
EF1	This tornado touched down near KY 47 and I-71, downing several large trees and branches before moving southeast into Gallatin County. Near KY 467, numerous trees were snapped along a half-mile stretch, while an older barn partially lost its roof, scattering metal roofing into nearby vegetation. The tornado continued into Owen County, where it snapped additional trees and severely damaged a well-built barn near Bromley, removing its roof and at least two walls, while several homes sustained shingle and gutter damage. Farther southeast, the tornado completely destroyed a barndominium and another barn, overturning and repeatedly rolling a large recreational vehicle and injuring one occupant. After crossing Brush Creek, the tornado caused extensive structural damage, removing most of the roof from a large barn and the entire roof from a single-story home, while snapping numerous trees. Additional homes and barns sustained minor roof damage before the tornado removed most of the roof from another residence and crossed into Grant County. There, extensive tree damage continued, and several older barns and outbuildings were completely destroyed before the tornado crossed I-75 and US 25. Additional trees were damaged and uprooted farther east before the tornado dissipated.						
EF0	NE of Feesburg	Brown	OH	38.8857°N 83.9928°W	19:21–19:24	1.65 mi (2.66 km)	90 yd (82 m)
EF0	The tornado caused damage along SR 505, tearing several pieces of roofing from an outbuilding and knocking a tree across the highway. It continued southeast, snapping and downing numerous trees in a convergent pattern before producing additional tree damage farther along its path and eventually dissipating.						
EF1	SSW of West Point	Hardin	KY	37.9679°N 85.9658°W	20:03–20:04	0.16 mi (0.26 km)	25 yd (23 m)
EF1	This brief tornado snapped trees.						
EF0	Purchase to N of Rye Brook	Westchester	NY	41.03°N 73.71°W	20:10–20:17	1.83 mi (2.95 km)	40 yd (37 m)
EF0	A tornado sheared off tree tops and snapped or uprooted numerous trees, and also downed a few power lines in the area.						
EF2	Caywood, OH to S of St. Marys, WV	Washington (OH), Pleasants (WV)	OH, WV	39.464°N 81.428°W	20:14–20:30	13.34 mi (21.47 km)	600 yd (550 m)
EF2	This strong tornado touched down in Caywood and tracked southeast, toppling a silo, damaging several homes, snapping trees, and destroying a cinderblock outbuilding. A camper was also thrown off a hillside before the tornado reached its peak intensity near SR 26, where a roughly wide section of pine forest was completely flattened, with every tree trunk snapped several feet above the ground. The tornado weakened as it continued southeast, producing sporadic tree damage before crossing the Ohio River into West Virginia near Belmont. After entering West Virginia, it damaged and overturned several camper trailers at Riverview Estates before continuing southeast over a ridge and intermittently touching down through the Green Run neighborhood before dissipating.						
EF2	Newport, OH to Cloverdale, WV to SE of Mountain, WV	Washington (OH), Pleasants (WV), Ritchie (WV)	OH, WV	39.409°N 81.266°W	20:25–20:48	12.86 mi (20.70 km)	1,000 yd (910 m)
EF2	A high-end EF2 tornado initially touched down, snapping and uprooting numerous trees before tracking southeast through Newport, where several homes sustained minor damage and scattered trees were damaged. The tornado strengthened as it crossed the Ohio River into West Virginia near the Hi Carpenter Memorial Bridge, nearly tearing a large sign from the bridge and causing significant damage to nearby trees. It continued southeast up a hillside, reaching peak intensity near WV 16, where several homes sustained significant damage, a communications tower was buckled, and a roughly 600 yd (550 m)-wide section of hardwood forest was leveled. The tornado then weakened and intermittently touched down along WV 16 toward Cloverdale, producing additional tree damage before crossing into Ritchie County. It dissipated less than half a mile beyond the county line.						
EF1	E of Dart, OH to Raven Rock, WV to SSE of Central Station, WV	Washington (OH), Pleasants (WV), Tyler (WV), Ritchie (WV), Doddridge (WV)	OH, WV	39.487°N 81.231°W	20:28–20:59	27.65 mi (44.50 km)	1,320 yd (1,210 m)
EF1	This high-end EF1 tornado initially touched down in Wayne National Forest in Ohio, snapping and uprooting trees as it tracked southeast through Leith before crossing the Ohio River into West Virginia near Raven Rock. It continued along an intermittent path through Pleasants, Tyler, and Ritchie counties, producing primarily weak to moderate tree damage despite widening to approximately three-quarters of a mile near the Pleasants–Tyler county line. The tornado maintained a similarly broad damage path near WV 74 around Mountain before crossing back into Tyler County and continuing into Doddridge County. There, the tornado again spanned approximately three-quarters of a mile wide in width and damage continued to remain limited to trees before eventually dissipating over hilly terrain. This is was the first tornado that Doddridge County has seen since 1986 and the first tornado Tyler County has seen since 2000.						
EF0	SSE of North Middletown	Bourbon	KY	38.1174°N 84.0934°W	21:25–21:26	0.2 mi (0.32 km)	25 yd (23 m)
EF0	A weak tornado caused minor tree damage.						
EF2	E of Wax to Rowletts to E of Horse Cave	Grayson, Hart	KY	37.3474°N 86.1113°W	21:27–22:08	21.5 mi (34.6 km)	500 yd (460 m)
EF2	This strong tornado touched down east of Wax and rapidly intensified, heavily damaging or destroying two mobile homes, causing moderate to severe damage to several outbuildings, and snapping or uprooting numerous trees. It crossed Nolin River Lake into Hart County, producing additional tree damage before strengthening east of Winesap, where an old outbuilding was destroyed and several windows were shattered at a home. Farther along its path, the tornado snapped more trees and moderately damaged another outbuilding before crossing I-65, where it removed the roof of a mobile home, heavily damaged an outbuilding, and snapped or stripped branches from trees. The tornado then struck Rowletts, removing the roofs of multiple mobile homes, shifting others off their block foundations, destroying an outbuilding, and causing minor roof damage to several frame-built homes. It continued northeast, snapping and uprooting additional trees and heavily damaging outbuildings before dissipating. One person was injured.						
EF1	W of Hustonville	Casey, Lincoln	KY	37.4692°N 84.8686°W	21:37–21:39	1.22 mi (1.96 km)	220 yd (200 m)
EF1	This tornado snapped trees, partially unroofed an outbuilding, and damaged a wooden power pole.						
EF0	N of Philippi	Barbour	WV	39.2°N 80.038°W	21:38–21:39	0.3 mi (0.48 km)	110 yd (100 m)
EF0	This high-end EF0 tornado debranched or uprooted trees.						
EF0	Cape May Point	Cape May	NJ	38.9349°N 74.9684°W	22:15–22:16	0.25 mi (0.40 km)	30 yd (27 m)
EF0	A waterspout came ashore and traveled a short distance, tearing down tree limbs and branches.						
EFU	NE of Snowflake	Navajo	AZ	34.54°N 110.05°W	22:15–22:30	0.2 mi (0.32 km)	25 yd (23 m)
EFU	A landspout occurred over open country.						
EF1	S of Center NNE of Knob Lick	Metcalfe	KY	37.119°N 85.709°W	22:19–22:25	2.74 mi (4.41 km)	150 yd (140 m)
EF1	This high-end EF1 tornado tracked south-southeast, producing minor damage initially. The most significant damage occurred at a large barn near a residence, where roofing material was torn away and scattered across an open field, with metal panels wrapped around trees nearly 1,000 ft (300 m) away. The tornado continued southeast, causing additional tree damage before weakening and dissipating.						
EF1	S of Lehew, WV to northern Wilde Acres, VA	Hampshire (WV), Frederick (VA)	WV, VA	39.1756°N 78.4399°W	22:20–22:30	3.28 mi (5.28 km)	225 yd (206 m)
EF1	A tornado damaged roofs and siding on multiple houses and downed or snapped thousands of trees.						
EF0	Diamond	Venango	PA	41.6096°N 79.8049°W	22:37–22:38	1.05 mi (1.69 km)	50 yd (46 m)
EF0	Multiple trees and branches were downed.						
EF0	E of Edmonton	Metcalfe	KY	37.033°N 85.6078°W	20:43–20:53	3.99 mi (6.42 km)	75 yd (69 m)
EF0	A tornado touched down and caused concentrated tree damage before moving south-southeast, where it partially removed the roof of a mobile home and damaged additional trees. The tornado continued southward across the Cumberland Expressway, where large tree limbs were downed onto several homes and numerous large trees were uprooted. It continued through a residential property before quickly lifting.						
EF0	Northeastern Youngstown to WSW of New Bedford, PA	Trumbull, Mahoning	OH	41.1419°N 80.6181°W	22:44–23:00	6.18 mi (9.95 km)	100 yd (91 m)
EF0	A high-end EF0 tornado began in Liberty Township near US 62, snapping several tree branches before tracking southeast, where additional trees were damaged and a residence sustained minor roof damage. The tornado continued into Mahoning County and Youngstown, damaging dozens of trees in heavily wooded areas before moving through the McGuffey Heights neighborhood. Near SR 616, the tornado caused additional minor tree damage and overturned a wagon attached to a heavier trailer. Farther southeast, the tornado reached its peak intensity, snapping numerous large tree branches that caused minor damage to a residence. Several additional trees were uprooted before the tornado continued southeast toward the Ohio–Pennsylvania state line, north of US 422 and dissipated.						
EF1	NW of Whitmer	Randolph	WV	38.834°N 79.583°W	22:55–22:57	0.85 mi (1.37 km)	250 yd (230 m)
EF1	A tornado traveled down the side of Rich Mountain and snapped or uprooted numerous trees along its short path. This is the first time a tornado has occurred in Randolph County since 1980.						
EF0	S of Seneca Rocks	Pendleton	WV	38.7991°N 79.3677°W	23:04–23:06	0.19 mi (0.31 km)	75 yd (69 m)
EF0	A very brief tornado caused some tree damage within the Spruce Knob–Seneca Rocks National Recreation Area.						
EF0	S of New Bedford	Lawrence	PA	41.0867°N 80.5081°W	23:05–23:06	0.49 mi (0.79 km)	200 yd (180 m)
EF0	This tornado uprooted or debranched trees and caused minor roof damage.						
EF1	SSE of Ruddle, WV to WSW of Criders, VA	Pendleton (WV), Rockingham (VA)	WV, VA	38.6823°N 79.2926°W	23:20–23:45	12.95 mi (20.84 km)	150 yd (140 m)
EF1	This tornado snapped or uprooted numerous trees, including one that fell onto a vehicle on its path through mountainous terrain.						
EF0	S of Portersville	Butler	PA	40.9028°N 80.1389°W	23:55–23:56	0.23 mi (0.37 km)	50 yd (46 m)
EF0	A weak tornado debranched trees.						
EF0	SW of Prospect	Butler	PA	40.8745°N 80.0975°W	00:01–00:02	0.23 mi (0.37 km)	30 yd (27 m)
EF0	A few trees were uprooted and large tree branches were downed.						
EF0	WNW of Mechanicsville to NW of New Market	Rockingham, Shenandoah	VA	38.6971°N 78.8326°W	00:08–00:18	7.51 mi (12.09 km)	100 yd (91 m)
EF0	A tornado touched down on a farm, snapping the tops of numerous trees and tossing farm equipment, including trailers and carts. In surrounding wooded areas, approximately half of the trees along its path were snapped or uprooted in a convergent pattern. The tornado continued east through unpopulated forests and fields for about a mile before reaching another farm, where additional trees were snapped or uprooted. After crossing into Shenandoah County, the tornado knocked down approximately 50 trees, including one that fell onto a chicken coop. Farther east, numerous additional trees were snapped or uprooted, with large branches broken off before the tornado produced its final observed damage, uprooting another large tree and snapping several branches.						
EF0	E of Morning Star to W of Sperryville	Page, Rappahannock	VA	38.6626°N 78.323°W	00:45–00:47	2.29 mi (3.69 km)	75 yd (69 m)
EF0	This tornado snapped or uprooted many trees and blew down a few metal road signs in Shenandoah National Park.						

=== July 27 event ===
List of confirmed tornadoes – Monday, July 27, 2026
EF#	Location	County / Parish	State	Start Coord.	Time (UTC)	Path length	Max width
EF0	Glen Ellyn	DuPage	IL	41.8946°N 88.0658°W	16:55–16:57	0.94 mi (1.51 km)	75 yd (69 m)
EF0	This tornado caused a narrow swath of primarily tree damage, with larger branches falling on power lines and damaging homes and vehicles.						
EF0	Wheaton	DuPage	IL	41.8645°N 88.1°W	16:55–16:57	0.97 mi (1.56 km)	75 yd (69 m)
EF0	Several trees were snapped and numerous tree limbs were downed throughout Wheaton.						
EF3	Western Appleton to Menasha	Outagamie, Winnebago	WI	44.2766°N 88.4383°W	16:56–17:22	12.46 mi (20.05 km)	1,500 yd (1,400 m)
EF3	This large and intense tornado touched down in Appleton. Tracking southward, the tornado initially caused minor damage to roof coverings before strengthening to EF2 intensity as it crossed the Fox River and passed into Winnebago County, causing widespread damage to buildings, trees, and transmission lines. The tornado strengthened to EF3 intensity as it collapsed the walls of a low-rise building before quickly weakening and causing EF1 and intermittent EF2 damage to structures. The tornado strengthens once again to EF3 intensity on approach to Lake Winnebago as it completely levels an unanchored home and collapses the walls of a bakery. The tornado proceeded to cause EF2 damage to houses before transitioning into a waterspout over Lake Winnebago and later dissipating. There were 98 injuries attributed to the tornado; 42 direct and 56 indirect.						
EF0	Downers Grove	DuPage	IL	41.7896°N 88.0169°W	17:09–17:13	2.1 mi (3.4 km)	100 yd (91 m)
EF0	A weak tornado snapped and uprooted trees in Downers Grove.						
EF0	Southern Romeoville	Will	IL	41.6302°N 88.0777°W	17:28–17:33	2.5 mi (4.0 km)	110 yd (100 m)
EF0	The tornado touched down just east of IL 53 near Romeoville High School and tracked southward, crossing the highway and producing sporadic tree damage before entering the Lewis University campus. There, numerous tree limbs were snapped or blown down, a baseball field's dugout and fencing were damaged, and an HVAC system on a building's roof sustained damage. The tornado then turned southwest, causing additional tree damage before dissipating.						
EF0	S of Palos Park to Orland Park	Cook	IL	41.6521°N 87.8972°W	17:34–17:38	2.9 mi (4.7 km)	250 yd (230 m)
EF0	Several trees were completely upended or split off within the Tampier Lake Forest Preserve. Numerous trees and tree limbs were blown down within Orland Park.						
EF1	Country Club Hills to Harvey to western Glenwood	Cook	IL	41.5772°N 87.74°W	17:47–18:03	11.4 mi (18.3 km)	200 yd (180 m)
EF1	This high-end EF1 tornado touched down just east of I-57 and tracked eastward, crossing I-80 while downing trees and removing roofing material from several apartment buildings. After crossing the interchange of I-80 and I-294 in northern Hazel Crest, the tornado turned northeast and began a counterclockwise loop, causing additional tree damage and minor structural damage as it moved north and then northwest through portions of Markham and Harvey. The tornado subsequently turned south and intensified, reaching peak intensity as it removed the roof of an industrial building and caused significant exterior roof and wall damage to an apartment complex. Continuing southeast, the tornado crossed its earlier path and I-80 for a third time before entering a railroad yard in Homewood, where four double-stacked intermodal containers were overturned. Numerous trees were damaged in the surrounding area, with additional tree damage continuing until the tornado dissipated just east of Thorn Creek.						
EF1	Northern Lynwood, IL southern Lansing, IL to northwestern Munster, IN	Cook (IL), Lake (IN)	IL, IN	41.5417°N 87.5804°W	17:58–18:05	3.72 mi (5.99 km)	225 yd (206 m)
EF1	A tornado touched down along southern portions of Lansing Woods Forest Preserve and tracked eastward, damaging trees and causing minor roof damage to a home before turning northeast and crossing IL 83. As it moved through a neighborhood west of a middle school, several homes sustained significant roof and exterior wall damage. Two people suffered minor injuries after portions of their roofs collapsed. The tornado continued northeast, producing additional tree damage and minor structural damage before crossing into Indiana. There, the tornado caused only tree damage in Munster before dissipating.						
EF0	Northeastern Sweetser to western Marion	Grant	IN	40.5805°N 85.7715°W	20:31–20:37	5.62 mi (9.04 km)	50 yd (46 m)
EF0	A tornado touched down in a cornfield north of Sweetser and tracked southeast into the town, where several large tree branches were downed and a few tree trunks were snapped. Farther southeast after quickly exiting Sweetser, significant tree damage occurred at several residences, including one where a large tree fell onto a house and another where fencing was damaged. The tornado continued into an apartment complex, downing large branches and causing roof damage to several buildings before crossing SR 18, where it removed much of the roofing material from a trucking company facility while leaving the underlying plywood intact. Debris from the facility, including a steel reel, was thrown across the highway. The tornado then crossed open fields before entering western Marion, where extensive tree damage occurred throughout several residential areas before the tornado lifted.						
EF0	W of Hoopeston	Vermilion	IL	40.4754°N 87.6905°W	23:14–23:16	1.02 mi (1.64 km)	30 yd (27 m)
EF0	This tornado caused damage to two light poles on the western outskirts of Hoopeston.						

=== July 28 event ===
List of confirmed tornadoes – Tuesday, July 28, 2026
EF#	Location	County / Parish	State	Start Coord.	Time (UTC)	Path length	Max width
EF1	S of Camp Creek	Greene	TN	36.0483°N 82.7609°W	21:35–21:42	1.63 mi (2.62 km)	300 yd (270 m)
EF1	This tornado touched down and tracked southeast, producing a distinct path of tree damage into the higher terrain of Green Mountain. Due to the remote and heavily forested terrain, the full extent of the damage could not be determined. This is the first tornado Greene County has seen since 2011.						
EF0	NE of White Rock	Madison	NC	35.993°N 82.686°W	21:49–21:51	1.05 mi (1.69 km)	75 yd (69 m)
EF0	Numerous trees were snapped or uprooted within Allegheny.						
EFU	SW of Kanosh	Millard	UT	38.76°N 112.48°W	22:03–22:10	0.25 mi (0.40 km)	30 yd (27 m)
EFU	A fire tornado associated with the Widemouth 2 fire was recorded and photographed. No damage is known to have occurred. This is the first tornado that Millard County has seen since 1996.						
EF0	Riviera Beach	Anne Arundel	MD	39.1736°N 76.5256°W	22:04–22:08	1.06 mi (1.71 km)	90 yd (82 m)
EF0	This tornado likely began as a waterspout over the tidal Patapsco River before moving onshore near Cox Creek in Riviera Beach, where it overturned a grill and snapped numerous trees near their tops. Continuing southward, the tornado bent a street sign, removed large sections of siding from a home, and downed numerous additional trees. Farther along its path, large tree limbs were twisted or snapped off, and the tops of several trees were sheared away. The tornado then crossed Stoney Creek near MD 173, downing additional trees and a power pole before dissipating in the Sunset Beach neighborhood.						
EF1	Northern Trappe	Talbot	MD	38.6719°N 76.0602°W	22:12–22:13	0.15 mi (0.24 km)	30 yd (27 m)
EF1	This very brief tornado caused tree damage behind an industrial park before damaging a large metal building, tearing off its metal roof covering and damaging several roof trusses. Large tree branches were also broken at a nearby residence. The tornado continued through a cornfield, leaving a distinct convergent damage path before dissipating. This was the first tornado to occur in Talbot County since 2000.						
EF1	Southern Lake Shore to eastern Cape St. Claire	Anne Arundel	MD	39.0941°N 76.47°W	22:15–22:22	3.84 mi (6.18 km)	200 yd (180 m)
EF1	This tornado began on the northern shores of the Magothy River, snapping and uprooting several trees before intensifying as it tracked through residential areas. Numerous trees and a power pole were uprooted, several tree trunks were snapped, and a boat was lofted over a pier and onto a jet ski. A large tree fell onto a house, while another residence sustained roof shingle and siding damage. The tornado continued across Grays Creek, uprooting numerous additional trees and snapping several trunks, with damage patterns indicating rotation. It then crossed the Magothy River and moved onshore in Cape St. Claire, where more trees were snapped or uprooted and debris was lofted into the air. The tornado dissipated near the mouth of the Little Magothy River, with no additional damage reported farther east.						
EF1	Northeastern Arnold	Anne Arundel	MD	39.0546°N 76.4648°W	22:17–22:19	0.33 mi (0.53 km)	75 yd (69 m)
EF1	A tornado snapped and damaged multiple trees and blew a garage door in.						
EF0	N of Trappe	Talbot	MD	38.6786°N 76.0519°W	22:18–22:19	0.34 mi (0.55 km)	30 yd (27 m)
EF0	This tornado caused minor tree and vegetation damage before damaging the roofs of a few outbuildings.						
EF0	SW of Lake Santeetlah	Graham	NC	35.345°N 83.885°W	23:40–23:43	1.3 mi (2.1 km)	75 yd (69 m)
EF0	This tornado downed multiple trees to the southwest of Lake Santeetlah. This is only the second documented tornado in Graham County since reliable records began in 1950 and the first since 1974.						
EF0	E of Hiawassee	Towns, Rabun	GA	34.93°N 83.64°W	00:34–00:40	1.69 mi (2.72 km)	100 yd (91 m)
EF0	This QLCS tornado uprooted trees and removed branches.						
EF0	N of Batesville	Habersham	GA	34.8°N 83.612°W	00:49–00:53	2.77 mi (4.46 km)	30 yd (27 m)
EF0	Several trees were downed near Goshen Mountain.						
EF0	N of Jasper	Pickens	GA	34.54°N 84.45°W	02:29–02:33	0.9 mi (1.4 km)	30 yd (27 m)
EF0	This tornado uprooted trees and snapped branches.						

=== July 29 event ===
List of confirmed tornadoes – Wednesday, July 29, 2026
EF#	Location	County / Parish	State	Start Coord.	Time (UTC)	Path length	Max width
EF0	South Brookfield	Madison	NY	42.7629°N 75.3189°W	17:54–17:56	0.87 mi (1.40 km)	50 yd (46 m)
EF0	A tornado broke tree branches and tipped over multiple shed-like structures.						

=== July 30 event ===
List of confirmed tornadoes – Thursday, July 30, 2026
EF#	Location	County / Parish	State	Start Coord.	Time (UTC)	Path length	Max width
EF0	N of Mullen	Cherry	NE	42.33°N 101.04°W	21:33	0.01 mi (0.016 km)	10 yd (9.1 m)
EF0	A landspout remained over open country.						

=== July 31 event ===
List of confirmed tornadoes –Friday, July 31, 2026
EF#	Location	County / Parish	State	Start Coord.	Time (UTC)	Path length	Max width
EFU	ESE of Jake Prairie	Crawford	MO	38.1467°N 91.4427°W	22:37–22:38	0.02 mi (0.032 km)	10 yd (9.1 m)
EFU	A storm chaser observed this tornado using a drone. No damage was observed.						
EF0	SSE of Chamois	Osage	MO	38.6262°N 38.6262°W	22:59-23:00	0.45 mi (0.72 km)	100 yd (91 m)
EF0	A weak tornado struck a farmstead causing minor damage to a home. An outbuilding suffered partial loss of its roof and some tree damage also occurred.						
EFU	S of Cedar Rapids	Linn	IA	41.92°N 91.72°W	00:52	0.01 mi (0.016 km)	10 yd (9.1 m)
EFU	A tornado briefly touched down just north of the Eastern Iowa Airport and caused no damage.						
EF1	Terre du Lac	St. Francois	MO	37.9095°N 90.6401°W	02:35-02:36	0.77 mi (1.24 km)	100 yd (91 m)
EF1	This brief tornado snapped or uprooted multiple trees and shattered windows and inflicted minor roof damage to a couple of homes.						

== August ==
Confirmed tornadoes by Enhanced Fujita rating
EFU	EF0	EF1	EF2	EF3	EF4	EF5	Total
11	38	38	4	0	0	0	91

=== August 1 event ===
List of confirmed tornadoes – Saturday, August 1, 2026
EF#	Location	County / Parish	State	Start Coord.	Time (UTC)	Path length	Max width
EF0	Folly Beach	Charleston	SC	32.66°N 79.94°W	19:33–19:34	0.05 mi (0.080 km)	
EF0	A waterspout formed and moved ashore where it was recorded by several onlookers. Several tents were damaged and thrown.						
EF0	Indianapolis	Marion	IN	39.73°N 86.15°W	21:20–21:22	0.22 mi (0.35 km)	100 yd (91 m)
EF0	This tornado uprooted trees, broke tree branches, and caused minor damage to property.						
EF1	E of Lawrenceville to SW of Cedar Grove	Dearborn, Franklin	IN	39.28°N 85.01°W	22:32–22:43	5.24 mi (8.43 km)	90 yd (82 m)
EF1	This tornado produced minor tree and structural damage before intensifying as it moved northeastward, snapping and uprooting several large hardwood trees, destroying barns, and damaging a home. The tornado continued northeastward, producing more tree and scattered structural damage before dissipating.						
EF0	NW of Melvine	Bledsoe, Cumberland	TN	35.77°N 85.12°W	23:21–23:27	1.77 mi (2.85 km)	140 yd (130 m)
EF0	This tornado uprooted trees and minorly damaged structures along its path before dissipating.						
EF0	E of Allardt	Fentress	TN	36.37°N 84.81°W	23:32–23:34	0.43 mi (0.69 km)	50 yd (46 m)
EF0	This brief tornado uprooted and snapped trees before dissipating.						
EF1	NW of Eaton	Preble	OH	39.79°N 84.67°W	23:58–00:02	0.92 mi (1.48 km)	250 yd (230 m)
EF1	This short-lived tornado destroyed a barn before it damaged various homes, including two that suffered EF1 damage. Several large hardwood trees were snapped in the area as well.						
EF0	SW of Franklin	Warren	OH	39.55°N 84.33°W	00:23–00:28	1.80 mi (2.90 km)	100 yd (91 m)
EF0	This tornado snapped tree limbs, flattened portions of a cornfield, and removed a large portion of a wall and part of the roof off an industrial building.						
EF0	E of New Lebanon	Montgomery	OH	39.71°N 84.33°W	00:37–00:43	2.66 mi (4.28 km)	150 yd (140 m)
EF0	This tornado snapped trees, tore off the roof from a barn, and inflicted minor damage to businesses.						

=== August 7 event ===
List of confirmed tornadoes – Friday, August 7, 2026
EF#	Location	County / Parish	State	Start Coord.	Time (UTC)	Path length	Max width
EF2	SE of Fairbank to NE of Littleton	Buchanan	IA	42.61°N 92.03°W	21:12–21:20	5 mi (8.0 km)	150 yd (140 m)
EF2	This rain-wrapped tornado inflicted mostly EF1 damage along its track, with EF2 damage being noted near the end of the path, where a power pole was snapped at the base and four other power poles were pulled out of the ground. It is likely the tornado had short-lived vortices that inflicted the damage observed.						
EF1	NW of Prairieburg	Linn	IA	42.26°N 91.47°W	22:11–22:12	0.35 mi (0.56 km)	25 yd (23 m)
EF1	This brief tornado struck a farmstead, with an outbuilding sustaining EF1 damage. A piece of roofing from the outbuilding was shot through the wall of the nearby house.						
EF1	Rubio	Washington	IA	41.22°N 91.94°W	20:43–20:45	1.40 mi (2.25 km)	175 yd (160 m)
EF1	This tornado tracked through the entire town of Rubio, with numerous trees having branches broken off with some being completely snapped. A home had damage to shingles and the nearby carport was destroyed. The tornado continued to the east, inflicting damage to crops before dissipating.						

=== August 8 event ===
List of confirmed tornadoes – Saturday, August 8, 2026
EF#	Location	County / Parish	State	Start Coord.	Time (UTC)	Path length	Max width
EF0	Northeastern Folly Beach	Charleston	SC	32.67°N 79.91°W	16:36–16:37	0.04 mi (0.064 km)	15 yd (14 m)
EF0	A waterspout moved slowly west-northwestward before moving onto land. It lofted various tents, chairs, surfboards, and beach coverings into the air and tracked directly over a group of people on the beach before dissipating after being on land for about 30 seconds. It was the second waterspout to come ashore onto Folly Beach in less than two weeks.						

=== August 9 event ===
List of confirmed tornadoes – Sunday, August 9, 2026
EF#	Location	County / Parish	State	Start Coord.	Time (UTC)	Path length	Max width
EFU	SW of Atkinson	Henry	IL	41.37°N 90.07°W	02:27–02:28	0.14 mi (0.23 km)	
EFU	This brief tornado was documented by storm chasers and produced no damage.						
EFU	ENE of German Corner	Henry	IL	41.33°N 89.95°W	02:54–02:55	0.17 mi (0.27 km)	
EFU	This brief tornado was documented by storm chasers and produced no damage.						
EFU	NNE of German Corner	Henry	IL	41.34°N 90.00°W	03:40–03:41	0.16 mi (0.26 km)	
EFU	This brief tornado was documented by storm chasers and produced no damage.						
EF1	E of Amboy to SSE of Ashton	Lee	IL	41.706°N 89.2375°W	03:02–03:24	6.97 mi (11.22 km)	200 yd (180 m)
EF1	This tornado caused tree and roof damage in Shaws before continuing out over open fields, causing damage to electrical transmission lines, uprooting trees, and collapsing the walls of an outbuilding. The tornado did not cause any damage for the remainder of its track, though swirl marks were still visible in the fields via drone imagery.						
EFU	SE of Brimfield	Peoria	IL	40.81°N 89.88°W	04:53	0.16 mi (0.26 km)	
EFU	This brief tornado was reported by a storm chaser and produced no damage.						
EF1	NNE of Streator to NE of Kangley	LaSalle	IL	41.164°N 88.8163°W	04:16–04:33	4.84 mi (7.79 km)	500 yd (460 m)
EF1	This tornado touched down to the north-northeast of Streator, moving to the northeast before making a counterclockwise loop, damaging a couple outbuildings, several residences, trees, crops, and power poles before dissipating.						
EF0	NE of Streator	LaSalle	IL	41.1623°N 88.7625°W	04:29–04:38	5.10 mi (8.21 km)	300 yd (270 m)
EF0	This tornado touched down and performed a nearly full counterclockwise loop near Kernan, damaging trees and tearing off shingles from a home before dissipating.						
EF1	WNW of Ransom to N of Ransom	LaSalle	IL	41.1746°N 88.7282°W	04:35–04:59	8.52 mi (13.71 km)	650 yd (590 m)
EF1	This very erratic tornado touched down to the west-northwest of Ransom, looping back to its starting point before traveling northeastward, damaging outbuildings and power poles. The tornado then reached peak intensity, completely destroying an outbuilding. The tornado began to turn to the east, inflicting damage to more outbuildings and trees at a farmstead. The tornado damaged crops and powerpoles before striking and derailing several empty autorack train cars. The tornado turned back to the northwest, then made another turn to the southwest before dissipating.						

=== August 10 event ===
List of confirmed tornadoes – Monday, August 10, 2026
EF#	Location	County / Parish	State	Start Coord.	Time (UTC)	Path length	Max width
EF0	Baltimore to Dundalk	City of Baltimore, Baltimore	MD	39.26°N 76.55°W	20:39–20:45	1.87 mi (3.01 km)	90 yd (82 m)
EF0	A waterspout formed over the Patapsco River before moving ashore near the Seagirt Marine Terminal in the Port of Baltimore. The tornado continued to the east-northeast, inflicting damage to trees, displacing a vehicle, and causing minor damage to some structures before dissipating.						

=== August 11 event ===
List of confirmed tornadoes – Tuesday, August 11, 2026
EF#	Location	County / Parish	State	Start Coord.	Time (UTC)	Path length	Max width
EF0	S of Southern Jay County	Jay	IN	40.31°N 84.93°W	11:58–12:00	0.61 mi (0.98 km)	15 yd (14 m)
EF0	This weak tornado struck crops and a small group of trees, snapping some branches before dissipating.						
EF1	W of Greeley	Delaware	IA	42.59°N 91.43°W	12:31–12:33	2.41 mi (3.88 km)	150 yd (140 m)
EF1	This tornado caused high-end EF1 damage to two farmsteads. Farm outbuildings were destroyed as well as numerous snapped trees and a snapped power pole. The tornado became smaller as it moved east, causing mostly tree damage.						
EF1	SE of Greeley	Delaware	IA	42.56°N 91.33°W	12:44–12:45	1.49 mi (2.40 km)	100 yd (91 m)
EF1	This brief tornado caused tree and crop damage as well as throwing a hoop outbuilding into a farmhouse causing damage to the windows and exterior walls of the house.						
EF1	N of Almoral	Delaware	IA	42.54°N 91.31°W	12:45–12:47	2.63 mi (4.23 km)	75 yd (69 m)
EF1	This tornado caused damage to a house, farm outbuildings, and trees. A tree fell on top of a house which heavily damaged a garage.						
EF0	N of Springfield	Clark	OH	40.02°N 83.80°W	13:24–13:30	4.45 mi (7.16 km)	150 yd (140 m)
EF0	This tornado touched down north of Springfield, moving through a parking lot and flipping over a semi-trailer. The tornado continued to the east-southeast, producing tree damage before dissipating.						
EF0	SW of DeWitt	Clinton	IA	41.81°N 90.55°W	13:29–13:30	0.35 mi (0.56 km)	
EF0	This brief tornado minorly damaged trees and inflicted shingle damage to a home before crossing 14th Avenue and damaging more houses, including one that had a portion of the roof peeled away. The tornado then crossed 1st Street, damaging more trees before dissipating.						
EF1	SE of Urbana	Champaign	OH	40.07°N 83.70°W	13:30–13:34	3.57 mi (5.75 km)	200 yd (180 m)
EF1	This tornado tracked southeastward, destroying a barn and damaging the roof and siding of a home, with mud being splattered onto multiple sides of the residence. The tornado damaged another home before producing damage mainly trees and dissipating.						
EF1	E of Springfield	Clark	OH	39.93°N 83.76°W	13:31–13:40	9.12 mi (14.68 km)	200 yd (180 m)
EF1	This tornado touched down to the east of Springfield, damaging and knocking trees onto homes and heavily damaging two barns. The tornado then struck a property, damaging a house, destroying a garage, and severely damaging a barn.						
EF2	S of Catawba	Clark	OH	39.99°N 83.65°W	13:33–13:38	3.47 mi (5.58 km)	400 yd (370 m)
EF2	This tornado first touched down on Vernon Asbury Road, downing trees before tracking to the east. The tornado began to strengthen, damaging more trees and completely destroying two outbuildings near South Persimmon Street. To the south, a home along the eastern side of the road sustained EF2 damage, with the entire roof being torn away and an attached garage being demolished. The tornado continued to the southeast, inflicting more tree damage along McConkey Road and Broadgauge Road before dissipating.						
EF1	Choctaw Lake	Madison	OH	39.97°N 83.49°W	13:44–13:45	0.80 mi (1.29 km)	125 yd (114 m)
EF1	This tornado first touched down near the Karok Drive/Seneca Drive intersection, downing numerous trees, with some falling onto structures, and minorly damaging homes. The tornado inflicted its most significant damage on the Northeastern side of Choctaw Lake, completely snapping five softwood trees. The tornado then uprooted a tree which fell onto a car before dissipating.						
EF0	SE of Plain City	Madison	OH	40.0804°N 83.2546°W	13:51–13:53	1.21 mi (1.95 km)	100 yd (91 m)
EF0	This brief tornado inflicted damage to trees, outbuildings, and crops.						
EF0	E of Upper Arlington to NNE of Grandview Heights	Franklin	OH	40.0173°N 83.0381°W	14:05–14:08	2.70 mi (4.35 km)	150 yd (140 m)
EF0	This tornado crossed OH-315 before inflicting minor damage to trees and structures. The tornado continued eastward, causing additional tree damage and minor damage to multiple businesses before entering residential areas. The tornado damaged several homes and other structures before crossing I-71, flipping one vehicle. The tornado then minorly damaged more residences and trees before dissipating. Along its track, two people were injured.						
EF1	S of Columbus	Franklin	OH	39.93°N 82.99°W	14:05–14:09	1.80 mi (2.90 km)	100 yd (91 m)
EF1	This tornado tracked through southern portions of Columbus, touching down on South 8th Street before damaging and uprooting trees. The tornado continued eastward, inflicting siding and roof damage to several homes. A business along Parsons Avenue lost large portions of its roof, and more homes and trees were damaged as the tornado tracked along South Champion Avenue. The tornado continued to inflict minor damage to trees and residences as it approached Fairwood Avenue, dissipating just west of the street.						
EF1	Olde Towne East	Franklin	OH	39.9631°N 82.9769°W	14:08–14:10	1.30 mi (2.09 km)	150 yd (140 m)
EF1	This brief tornado caused widespread tree damage and some structural damage, with a brick apartment losing its roof and a couple walls on the top floor.						
EF0	NE of Yorkville to SSE of Oswego	Kendall	IL	41.6760°N 88.4008°W	15:14–15:20	5.40 mi (8.69 km)	150 yd (140 m)
EF0	This weak tornado damaged various trees throughout several subdivisions before dissipating.						
EF0	NE of Langham to N of Wauponsee	Grundy	IL	41.3114°N 88.5057°W	15:20–15:22	1.63 mi (2.62 km)	250 yd (230 m)
EF0	This weak tornado caused damage to a property along Dupont Road.						
EF0	NNE of Morris	Grundy	IL	41.4004°N 88.4213°W	15:23–15:25	2.18 mi (3.51 km)	150 yd (140 m)
EF0	This tornado damaged crops, tossed and rolled numerous trailers at a trailer retailer, blew a semi truck into a ditch, and downed power poles before dissipating.						
EF1	NE of Wilmington	Will	IL	41.3064°N 88.1558°W	15:37–15:39	1.52 mi (2.45 km)	150 yd (140 m)
EF1	This short-lived tornado removed a piece of the roof of an automobile repair shop and tossed it before crossing the Kankakee River and tracking over the Oakwood Cemetery, where trees were significantly damaged. The tornado then tracked east before dissipating near the Forked Creek Perserve.						
EF1	NNE of New Lenox to NW of Frankfort Square	Will	IL	41.5487°N 87.9589°W	15:39–15:46	7.57 mi (12.18 km)	200 yd (180 m)
EF1	This tornado inflicted minor damage to trees before reaching its peak intensity in a subdivision near St. Mary's Catholic Church, damaging the shingles of homes and snapping hardwood trees at EF1 intensity. The tornado then continued east as it weakened and inflicted EF0 damage before dissipating just north of Hilda Walker Intermediate School.						
EF1	NNW of Mokena, IL to N of Munster, IN	Cook (IL), Lake (IN)	IL, IN	41.5738°N 87.9057°W	15:41–16:00	22.5 mi (36.2 km)	300 yd (270 m)
EF1	This weak but long-tracked tornado touched down just east of the Will/Cook County Line, moving rapidly eastward as it damaged trees and powerlines. The tornado damaged structures at EF1 strength as it tracked through southern portions of Tinley Park, with various treesand powerlines being damaged as well. The tornado then tracked through portions of Country Club Hills, Flossmoor, and Glenwood, where it uprooted and snapped numerous large trees. Several of these trees fell on vehicles and structures, causing damage. The tornado moved through Lansing, causing more significant tree damage before making a sharp turn to the north and dissipating after crossing I-80.						
EF2	SSW of Frankfort, IL to WNW of Crown Point, IN	Will (IL), Lake (IN)	IL, IN	41.4289°N 87.8842°W	15:43–16:02	25.75 mi (41.44 km)	500 yd (460 m)
EF2	This strong tornado first touched down near US 45, inflicting scattered tree damage as it paralleled West Monee Manhattan Road. The tornado then tracked over I-57 before impacting several industrial buildings, damaging the exterior walls and roofs. The tornado continued to damage trees as it crossed University Park and into Crete, intensifying as it entered northwestern Indiana. The tornado reached its maximum intensity in a St. John subdivision, where a single home had most of its roof removed, along with its west and south walls. The tornado then entered Crown Point near Clark Road before dissipating.						
EF1	E of Homewood to W of Lansing	Cook	IL	41.5539°N 87.6407°W	15:55–15:58	3.33 mi (5.36 km)	300 yd (270 m)
EF1	This tornado touched down just west of Halsted Street, crossing it and striking a strip mall and several apartment buildings. The strip mall had the roof covering peeled away and three HVAC units lifted off the roof, and an apartment building had a large portion of its roof removed, with more apartment buildings to the south sustaining less significant roof damage. The tornado continued eastward, tracking through a neighborhood and damaging the roofs of homes and numerous trees. The tornado bent a pole at Longwood Elementary School before tracking through a cemetery, snapping and uprooting various trees. The tornado tracked through the Thornton-Lansing Road Nature Preserve before dissipating shortly after crossing IL 394.						
EF1	W of Millville to S of Ross	Butler, Hamilton	OH	39.4067°N 84.7689°W	19:13–19:25	11.33 mi (18.23 km)	500 yd (460 m)
EF1	This tornado produced significant tree damage and minorly impacted several structures.						
EF0	WSW of Owensville to W of Williamsburg	Clermont	OH	39.1198°N 84.1615°W	19:47–19:53	5.20 mi (8.37 km)	200 yd (180 m)
EF0	This weak tornado caused sporadic tree and minor structural damage before lifting.						
EF0	S of Newtonsville to NNE of Williamsburg	Clermont	OH	39.1486°N 84.0942°W	19:49–19:55	5.50 mi (8.85 km)	150 yd (140 m)
EF0	This tornado snapped and damaged numerous trees and took the roof off a large barn.						
EF0	SW of Walton to NE of Patriot, IN	Boone	KY	38.8293°N 84.7138°W	19:51–19:54	2.85 mi (4.59 km)	150 yd (140 m)
EF0	This weak tornado knocked a tree onto a trailer, inflicted minor roof damage to a home and barn, and produced a narrow swath of tree damage before dissipating.						
EF0	SE of Fayetteville to NE of Mount Orab	Brown, Highland	OH	39.1249°N 83.8935°W	19:59–20:04	3.60 mi (5.79 km)	200 yd (180 m)
EF0	This weak tornado damaged trees, significantly damaged a barn, and removed some shingles from a home.						
EF1	NW of Lodge to Pesotum	Piatt, Champaign	IL	40.1388°N 88.5719°W	20:12–20:42	22.53 mi (36.26 km)	800 yd (730 m)
EF1	This tornado touched down to the northwest of Lodge, damaging power poles, crops, and trees as it tracked southeast. The tornado crossed I-72 in White Heath, flipping a box truck before damaging a garage and two large outbuildings. The tornado then tracked through Sadorus, damaging corn and trees before dissipating as it moved into Pesotum.						
EF1	W of Winchester to W of Cherry Fork	Brown, Adams	OH	38.9591°N 83.7344°W	20:16–20:24	7.10 mi (11.43 km)	350 yd (320 m)
EF1	This tornado first inflicted damage to trees and removed the roof from an outbuilding as it tracked southeast, damaging additional trees and outbuildings, including one outbuilding on Tibbe Road that was completely collapsed, before entering a crop field and dissipating.						

=== August 12 event ===
List of confirmed tornadoes – Wednesday, August 12, 2026
EF#	Location	County / Parish	State	Start Coord.	Time (UTC)	Path length	Max width
EFU	E of Rensselaer	Jasper	IN	40.94°N 87.11°W	15:49–15:50	0.43 mi (0.69 km)	50 yd (46 m)
EFU	A tornado tracked through farmland, damaging crops.						
EF1	NW of Bruceville	Knox	IN	38.80°N 87.44°W	19:03–19:07	1.47 mi (2.37 km)	150 yd (140 m)
EF1	The tornado first touched down in a tree grove to the northwest of Maria Creek and moved southeastward, snapping and uprooting more trees. The tornado then destroyed an outbuilding before dissipating shortly afterwards.						
EF1	Winslow	Pike	IN	38.39°N 87.22°W	20:09–20:10	1.00 mi (1.61 km)	250 yd (230 m)
EF1	This tornado tracked southeast before directly stricking Winslow, severely damaging several manufactured homes and various outbuildings. Numerous trees were snapped or uprooted, and several single-family homes sustained damage, including one that became inhabitable after a large tree fell onto it. The tornado then dissipated on the southeastern side of Winslow.						

=== August 13 event ===
List of confirmed tornadoes – Thursday, August 13, 2026
EF#	Location	County / Parish	State	Start Coord.	Time (UTC)	Path length	Max width
EF1	SW of Humphrey	Platte	NE	41.65°N 97.63°W	08:38–08:46	6.28 mi (10.11 km)	30 yd (27 m)
EF1	This tornado touched down in a field and tracked to the east-northeast, tipping over two irrigation systems, snapping several power poles and softwood trees, and removing the roof off a shed.						
EF0	SE of Humphrey	Platte	NE	41.66°N 97.45°W	08:50–08:53	3.36 mi (5.41 km)	20 yd (18 m)
EF0	This weak tornado damaged corn in fields and snapped small branches off trees.						
EF1	S of Leigh	Platte, Colfax	NE	41.69°N 97.29°W	08:56–09:07	4.36 mi (7.02 km)	30 yd (27 m)
EF1	This tornado tracked through a cemetery to the southeast of Leigh, snapping 10–12 trees and damaging a metal sign. The tornado then demolished a large machine shed and inflicted damage to trees near the southeast side of Leigh before dissipating.						
EF1	Southwestern Leigh	Colfax	NE	41.70°N 97.25°W	09:04–09:05	0.63 mi (1.01 km)	20 yd (18 m)
EF1	This brief satellite tornado to the first Leigh EF1 tornado touched down on the western side of the Club 91 Golf Course, tracking to the northeast. The tornado crossed a pond, damaging trees on both sides of it before dissipating shortly after tracking over West Fork Maple Creek.						
EFU	S of Kimball	Kimball	NE	41.04°N 103.68°W	22:46–22:50	0.86 mi (1.38 km)	10 yd (9.1 m)
EFU	A weak landspout was observed from HWY 71 and CR 8 south of Kimball.						
EF1	NNE of Dugway	Tooele	UT	40.30°N 112.73°W	23:41–23:43	0.99 mi (1.59 km)	300 yd (270 m)
EF1	This brief tornado touched down three miles northeast of Dugway, where it caused damage to a house, shattering the windows and destroying a carport. It tossed irrigation equipment around at a farm field, and snapped fence posts.						

=== August 15 event ===
List of confirmed tornadoes – Saturday, August 15, 2026
EF#	Location	County / Parish	State	Start Coord.	Time (UTC)	Path length	Max width
EFU	N of Fletcher	Miami	OH	40.18°N 84.12°W	00:05–00:07	0.57 mi (0.92 km)	50 yd (46 m)
EFU	This tornado impacted open fields north of Fletcher, confirmed by video evidence.						
EF0	NW of St. Paris	Champaign	OH	40.17°N 84.01°W	00:21–00:23	0.54 mi (0.87 km)	50 yd (46 m)
EF0	This short-lived tornado produced minor tree damage, and some roof damage occurred to an outbuilding.						
EF0	N of St. Paris	Champaign	OH	40.16°N 83.98°W	00:24–00:36	3.28 mi (5.28 km)	80 yd (73 m)
EF0	Several trees were downed by this tornado. A home also had some of its siding removed.						

=== August 16 event ===
List of confirmed tornadoes – Sunday, August 16, 2026
EF#	Location	County / Parish	State	Start Coord.	Time (UTC)	Path length	Max width
EF0	S of Hookstown	Beaver	PA	40.57°N 80.41°W	19:04–19:07	0.39 mi (0.63 km)	50 yd (46 m)
EF0	This tornado inflicted tree damage along its path.						
EF0	Orchard Hills	Armstrong	PA	40.583°N 79.5349°W	20:15–20:16	0.57 mi (0.92 km)	50 yd (46 m)
EF0	This brief tornado snapped and damaged multiple trees, including one which fell on and damaged a garage.						

=== August 18 event ===
List of confirmed tornadoes – Tuesday, August 18, 2026
EF#	Location	County / Parish	State	Start Coord.	Time (UTC)	Path length	Max width
EF0	SW of Germantown	Washington	WI	43.22°N 88.23°W	23:32–23:34	0.41 mi (0.66 km)	
EF0	This weak tornado damaged trees, dented siding, and blew out a window.						

=== August 19 event ===
List of confirmed tornadoes – Wednesday, August 19, 2026
EF#	Location	County / Parish	State	Start Coord.	Time (UTC)	Path length	Max width
EFU	W of Morning Son	Louisa	IA	41.09°N 91.31°W	20:52–21:00	0.09 mi (0.14 km)	5 yd (4.6 m)
EFU	A landspout caused no damage.						
EF1	W of Lowes	Carlisle, Graves	KY	36.8922°N 88.8334°W	04:47–04:49	1.50 mi (2.41 km)	75 yd (69 m)
EF1	This tornado touched down east-southeast of Cunningham, snapping and uprooting various trees before dissipating. Shortly after, an intense macroburst occurred in the same area.						
EF1	Viola	Graves	KY	36.8551°N 88.6713°W	04:59–05:01	0.33 mi (0.53 km)	50 yd (46 m)
EF1	This brief tornado touched down at the KY 408/US 45 intersection, stripping away garage and roof panels from a large metal industrial building with insulation being blasted onto north and east facing surfaces. Across the street, a gas station had its canopy blown over and several nearby outbuildings were damaged.						
EFU	W of Muncie	Delaware	IN	40.23°N 85.50°W	21:31	0.08 mi (0.13 km)	
EFU	This brief tornado touched down north of SR 332 and produced no damage.						

=== August 20 event ===
List of confirmed tornadoes – Thursday, August 20, 2026
EF#	Location	County / Parish	State	Start Coord.	Time (UTC)	Path length	Max width
EF0	SSW of Olivet	Hutchinson	SD	43.1993°N 97.6968°W	19:27–19:32	0.12 mi (0.19 km)	25 yd (23 m)
EF0	This brief tornado caused minor damage to a farmstead, overturning a camper and tearing off the roof panels of outbuildings.						
EF2	SSW of Wrightsville	York	PA	39.9994°N 76.5521°W	20:24–20:26	1.07 mi (1.72 km)	100 yd (91 m)
EF2	This brief but strong tornado initially snapped five trees before striking the Eastern York High School at its peak intensity. Several classrooms had their roofs fully torn away, while the auditorium had part of its roofing removed and several bricks near the top of the walls displaced from their original position. The tornado continued eastward, damaging the windows and siding of multiple homes, including one where a person was injured by a window being blown inward. The tornado then damaged crops before dissipating shortly after.						
EF1	Columbia	Lancaster	PA	40.0343°N 76.5015°W	20:30–20:33	3.01 mi (4.84 km)	100 yd (91 m)
EF1	This tornado first removed the roof off an old firehouse and knocked down the top-story wall, with another building nearby also losing its roof. The tornado continued to the southeast, destroying several outbuildings throughout the town before entering a wooded area, where numerous trees were snapped and uprooted. The tornado then turned to the southeast into a cornfield before dissipating.						
EF0	E of Mountville to NW of Millersville	Lancaster	PA	40.0314°N 76.3877°W	20:38–20:40	0.49 mi (0.79 km)	125 yd (114 m)
EF0	This tornado damaged trees and the gutters of homes before traveling east, tearing part of the roof off another house. The tornado then struck a townhome, partially removing the roof before uprooting more trees in a neighborhood. The tornado continued to snap and uproot additional trees before tracking into a field and dissipating.						
EF0	ESE of Mountville	Lancaster	PA	40.0271°N 76.4020°W	20:37	0.3 mi (0.48 km)	75 yd (69 m)
EF0	This brief tornado blew down corn in several cornfields. It was possible a secondary vortex developed to the east of the main one before they merged together.						
EF0	NE of Akka to WNW of Crossroads	Baldwin	AL	30.8187°N 87.952°W	20:52–21:04	2.86 mi (4.60 km)	150 yd (140 m)
EF0	This tornado inflicted minor damage to trees.						
EF0	NE of Downingtown	Chester	PA	40.0183°N 75.6751°W	21:40	0.21 mi (0.34 km)	30 yd (27 m)
EF0	This tornado snapped branches off trees.						
EFU	SE of Estell Manor	Atlantic	NJ	39.3500°N 74.7500°W	21:41		
EFU	This brief tornado lasted around 30 seconds, producing no known damage.						
EF1	W of Barclay	Queen Anne's	MD	39.1479°N 75.9016°W	21:41–21:42	0.5 mi (0.80 km)	65 yd (59 m)
EF1	This brief tornado snapped and uprooted several softwood trees before moving across a bean field and onto a residential property, where more softwood and hardwood trees were snapped at the base, including a healthy cedar tree.						
EF1	S of Marydel	Kent	DE	39.0957°N 75.7399°W	21:54–21:56	1.33 mi (2.14 km)	60 yd (55 m)
EF1	This tornado touched down, and uprooted two very large oak trees, which fell onto the corner of a home. Other hardwoods on the property were uprooted as the tornado continued to the east-northeast, entering a heavily wooded area. Throughout this area, the tornado snapped large branches and uprooted various species of trees before impacting another property, completely destroying an old barn and shed.						
EF0	ESE of Hazlettville	Kent	DE	39.1159°N 75.6368°W	22:02–22:03	0.6 mi (0.97 km)	100 yd (91 m)
EF0	This brief tornado struck a farm, removing half of a barn's roof panels, damaging several chicken houses, and minorly damaging a solar farm.						
EF1	Dover	Kent	DE	39.1396°N 75.5564°W	22:09–22:14	3.2 mi (5.1 km)	100 yd (91 m)
EF1	This high-end EF1 tornado first touched down in an open field, scarring crops before tracking over a tree line, snapping various branches and several tree tops. The tornado then directly hit the Dover Little League baseball fields located at Schutte Park, snapping at least seven large wooden light fixtures and ripping up fencing. A large scoreboard with a brick foundation was knocked over, and a second one supported by metal posts was bent and likely struck by an unknown object. The tornado then struck the VanSant Generating Station in Dover, pushing a trailer off its foundation and minorly damaging the roof and siding of a metal building before crossing over another tree line. The tornado then impacted a factory warehouse, collapsing two sections of concrete block walls, tossing and rolling a couple trailers, and peeling off a small portion of the roof. The tornado continued to the east-northeast as it weakened, making several sharp turns in a zig-zag like pattern throughout downtown Dover and crossing US 13 Alt., downing trees and snapping branches. After turning northward and crossing DE 8, the tornado reintensifed and reached its maximum width as it tracked just west of US 13. In this area, the tornado peeled half the roof off of a motel, damaged the roof of another motel nearby, and knocked over two large business signs. Shortly after, the tornado rapidly weakened and dissipated.						
EF1	Atlantic Beach	Nassau	NY	40.5877°N 73.7520°W	22:47–22:50	0.36 mi (0.58 km)	100 yd (91 m)
EF1	This tornado started as a waterspout, moving eastward while paralleling the Rockaways before crossing the entrance of the East Rockaway Inlet and moving ashore on the far western shoreline of Atlantic Beach. The tornado then entered the parking lot on the northern side of the Sun and Surf Beach Club, demolishing portions of a sand fence and shattering the rear and north facing windows of around 30 cars. The tornado continued to the east-southeast across the Sun and Surf Beach Club, significantly damaging the roofs and walls of around 25 to 30 beach bungalows, with the most major damage occurring on the south and western sides of the three easternmost rows of bungalows. In this area, one worker sustained minor injuries. Various nearby cabanas and storage units sustained minor to moderate damage. The tornado then continued to the southeast, moving back over water before dissipating.						

=== August 21 event ===
List of confirmed tornadoes – Friday, August 21, 2026
EF#	Location	County / Parish	State	Start Coord.	Time (UTC)	Path length	Max width
EF0	Henkel	Lee	IL	41.6077°N 89.1744°W	22:55–22:56	0.70 mi (1.13 km)	200 yd (180 m)
EF0	This brief tornado first began in a field east of US 51, damaging crops before tracking southward. The tornado damaged the roofs of several buildings and more crops before dissipating after moving into another field. Several storm chasers in the area documented the tornado's entire life cycle.						
EF0	S of DePue to E of Hennepin	Putnam	IL	41.3046°N 89.3166°W	00:11–00:26	4.3 mi (6.9 km)	100 yd (91 m)
EF0	This highly visible and dusty tornado caused little damage, first touching down along the southern shore of the Illinois River before tracking southeast. The tornado traveled across a quarry, knocking over part of an industrial conveyor system. The tornado turned more to the south as it weakened, producing scattered tree damage before dissipating.						

=== August 22 event ===
List of confirmed tornadoes – Saturday, August 22, 2026
EF#	Location	County / Parish	State	Start Coord.	Time (UTC)	Path length	Max width
EF1	Madera	Clearfield	PA	40.8285°N 78.4383°W	23:55–23:57	1.0 mi (1.6 km)	150 yd (140 m)
EF1	This brief tornado blew a large tree across a road before snapping and uprooting more trees and tearing the roof off a home. The tornado then inflicted more tree damage before dissipating.						

=== August 23 event ===
List of confirmed tornadoes – Sunday, August 23, 2026
EF#	Location	County / Parish	State	Start Coord.	Time (UTC)	Path length	Max width
EF0	Port St. Lucie	St. Lucie	FL	27.253°N 80.316°W	22:10–22:25	2.1 mi (3.4 km)	200 yd (180 m)
EF0	This tornado first touched down near the North Fork of the St. Lucie River before tracking towards a condominium complex, where it inflicted minor damage to awnings and roofs. The tornado then became a waterspout as it tracked over the St. Lucie River, lingering for several minutes. The tornado then resumed tracking southwestward, damaging trees as it crossed over a small barrier island before moving back onto the river. The tornado then once again tracked onto land near the community of Bay St. Lucie, removing the tiles of several homes, snapping branches off trees, and toppling a boat off a lift into the water. The tornado then tracked into a wooded area behind the homes, sporadically downing trees as it approached Jessica Clinton Park. The tornado then impacted more homes, inflicting minor damage to pool enclosures, awnings, fencing, and roofing, with several trees losing branches as well. The tornado dissipated near Florida's Turnpike shortly after.						

=== August 24 event ===
List of confirmed tornadoes – Monday, August 24, 2026
EF#	Location	County / Parish	State	Start Coord.	Time (UTC)	Path length	Max width
EF0	N of Atlantic	Carteret	NC	34.94°N 76.36°W	20:34	0.18 mi (0.29 km)	
EF0	A brief tornado damaged a couple of trees on open marshland. Preliminary information.						

=== August 27 event ===
List of confirmed tornadoes – Thursday, August 27, 2026
EF#	Location	County / Parish	State	Start Coord.	Time (UTC)	Path length	Max width
EF1	SSW of Hoffmeister	Hamilton	NY	43.36°N 74.73°W	20:30–20:31	0.25 mi (0.40 km)	75 yd (69 m)
EF1	An EF1 tornado was confirmed by NWS Albany. Preliminary information.						
EFU	ESE of Silver Cliff	Custer	CO	38.1285°N 105.2979°W	21:55–21:56	0.11 mi (0.18 km)	5 yd (4.6 m)
EFU	Emergency management reported this brief tornado, which produced no damage.						
EF1	NE of Saratoga Springs to SW of Gansevoort	Saratoga	NY	43.1420°N 73.7333°W	22:05–22:10	1.75 mi (2.82 km)	250 yd (230 m)
EF1	This tornado touched down west of I-87, snapping various trees before dissipating.						
EF0	S of Gansevoort	Saratoga	NY	43.1273°N 73.6846°W	22:10–22:11	0.19 mi (0.31 km)	50 yd (46 m)
EF0	This brief tornado uprooted multiple softwood trees.						

== September ==
Confirmed tornadoes by Enhanced Fujita rating
EFU	EF0	EF1	EF2	EF3	EF4	EF5	Total
18	12	12	3	0	0	0	45

=== September 1 event ===
List of confirmed tornadoes – Tuesday, September 1, 2026
EF#	Location	County / Parish	State	Start Coord.	Time (UTC)	Path length	Max width
EF1	W of Gaines to ESE of Galeton	Potter, Tioga	PA	41.7940°N 77.6155°W	21:33–21:48	6.5 mi (10.5 km)	150 yd (140 m)
EF1	This tornado snapped large branches off hardwood trees before intensifying, uprooting and snapping numerous trees within a swath that was 150 yards (140 m) long. The tornado continued to inflict damage to vegatation, uprooting and damaging more trees before dissipating.						
EF1	ESE of Washingtonville	Montour	PA	41.0343°N 76.6480°W	21:40–21:41	0.87 mi (1.40 km)	250 yd (230 m)
EF1	This brief tornado first touched down in a forest, snapping two large trees that fell on a shed. The tornado continued to uproot and snap trees before dissipating.						
EF1	NNE of Gap	Lancaster	PA	40.0340°N 75.9802°W	23:44–23:48	1.08 mi (1.74 km)	100 yd (91 m)
EF1	This tornado touched down and tore the roof off a barn, throwing the debris into a nearby graveyard. The tornado damaged another barn and snapped branches off trees before damaging three outbuildings and throwing the pieces into a field. The tornado damaged a cluster of trees before minorly damaging a barn and tearing the roof off a single-room school house. The tornado continued southward, inflicting damage to trees and bending a telephone pole before dissipating.						

=== September 2 event ===
List of confirmed tornadoes – Wednesday, September 2, 2026
EF#	Location	County / Parish	State	Start Coord.	Time (UTC)	Path length	Max width
EF1	Olcott	Niagara	NY	43.3382°N 78.7127°W	22:07–22:08	0.67 mi (1.08 km)	70 yd (64 m)
EF1	This tornado touched down in Olcott, inflicting significant damage to trees before tracking south-southeastward, inflicting its worst damage to a cluster of pine trees, with every tree being snapped or uprooted. The tornado then began to weaken, inflicting sporadic damage to more trees before dissipating.This is the first tornado Niagara County has seen since 1994.						
EF1	SE of Medina	Orleans	NY	43.1790°N 78.3367°W	22:45–22:47	1.20 mi (1.93 km)	200 yd (180 m)
EF1	This tornado knocked over several trees in a field before tracking across several properties, inflicting severe damage to trees and minor damage to homes. The tornado then entered a wooded area, snapping and uprooting various trees before dissipating over an open field.This is the first tornado Orleans County has seen since 1986.						
EF0	NE of Marysville	St. Clair	MI	42.9234°N 82.4690°W	23:19–23:21	0.35 mi (0.56 km)	175 yd (160 m)
EF0	This brief tornado inflicted sporadic damage to trees.						
EF1	ENE of Alexander to WNW of Wyoming	Genesee	NY	42.9096°N 78.2050°W	23:29–23:35	3.78 mi (6.08 km)	150 yd (140 m)
EF1	This tornado first touched down in a cornfield, downing various crops before striking several trees, snapping off branches and snapping one at the trunk. The tornado continued to damage trees as it tracked southeastward, tracking near a residence and downing numerous trees. In this area, a dense group of large locust trees were snapped at the trunk at high-end EF1 intensity. The tornado then inflicted scattered damage to more trees before dissipating.						
EF1	Webster to SW of Ontario	Monroe, Wayne	NY	43.23°N 77.40°W	23:30–23:34	3.23 mi (5.20 km)	130 yd (120 m)
EF1	This tornado touched down on the eastern end of Webster and snapped multiple softwood trees as it began moving southeast. Multiple hardwood trees were either snapped or uprooted later on, and a few power poles were knocked over. Whilst impacting a small subdivision, numerous trees were downed and multiple homes suffered roof uplift, considerable shingle loss and siding damage. The tornado then produced multiple areas of extensive tree damage in a forested area before dissipating.						
EF1	SSE of Castile to WSW of Nunda	Livingston	NY	42.5862°N 78.0354°W	23:59–00:01	1.25 mi (2.01 km)	130 yd (120 m)
EF1	This brief tornado first touched down in Letchworth State Park, snapping and uprooting numerous tall hardwood trees. Around half a dozen tall locust trees were snapped at the trunk, with some falling onto and damaging a pavilion. The tornado continued to the southeast, inflicting additional damage to softwood and hardwood trees before dissipating.						
EF1	S of Castile to SSE of Castile	Wyoming	NY	42.5666°N 78.0668°W	00:00–00:02	1.22 mi (1.96 km)	300 yd (270 m)
EF1	Occurring at the same time as the Letchworth State Park tornado on the opposite side of the Genesee River, this brief tornado touched down and damaged trees, intensifying as it struck various healthy softwood and hardwood trees, with many being uprooted or snapped. This tornado continued to damage trees along its path, including numerous large trees being snapped or uprooted, before dissipating.						
EF1	NW of Waterloo to NNW of Seneca Falls	Seneca	NY	42.9216°N 76.9232°W	00:21–00:32	6.69 mi (10.77 km)	250 yd (230 m)
EF1	This tornado occurred alongside a downburst, causing significant tree damage before dissipating. This is the first tornado Seneca County has seen since 2007.						
EF2	SSW of Rose Hill to SSW of Canoga	Seneca	NY	42.8336°N 76.9132°W	00:23–00:36	7.76 mi (12.49 km)	200 yd (180 m)
EF2	This strong tornado touched down and quickly strengthened, completely destroying a garage and several sheds. The tornado continued to destroy barns and outbuildings, with the debris being scattered across long distances. The tornado reached peak intensity at a farmstead, where a heifer barn was completely destroyed, with the debris being impaled into a nearby home. The tornado then heavily damaged a couple more farms and snapped several power poles before dissipating.						

=== September 3 event ===
List of confirmed tornadoes – Thursday, September 3, 2026
EF#	Location	County / Parish	State	Start Coord.	Time (UTC)	Path length	Max width
EF0	Lincoln Park	Wayne	MI	42.2391°N 83.1801°W	20:12–20:13	0.16 mi (0.26 km)	50 yd (0.046 km)
EF0	This brief tornado touched down and damaged electrical poles before tracking through Memorial Park, where trees had limbs snapped with a handful being uprooted.						
EF2	Detroit, MI to Windsor, ON	Wayne (MI), Essex (ON)	MI, ON	42.3685°N 83.0291°W	20:14–20:18 (U.S. portion)	7.84 mi (12.62 km)	1,200 yd (1,100 m)
EF2	This large and strong tornado touched down and first snapped branches off trees and damaged the siding of several residences before striking the Preferred Meal Systems building, ripping away parts of the roof and knocking over a nearby outbuilding. The surrounding fence was damaged, and a large tree was uprooted. The tornado continued to the southeast, uprooting and damaging several trees and inflicting damage to traffic lights before intensifying and expanding in width. The tornado impacted a couple of industrial buildings, partially removing the roofs and collapsing walls. The tornado tracked into more residential areas, snapping and uprooting large trees, damaging electrical and lighting poles, and inflicting damage to the roofs and siding of homes. The tornado then struck two vacant buildings, collapsing them with minimal structure remaining upright. A piece of sheet metal was found 1 mile (1.6 km) away in a field. The tornado continued to inflict damage to trees before damaging a restaurant, with the sign being torn off and the roof and veneer being damaged. The tornado crossed the Detroit River onto Belle Isle, throwing a scull boat into a tree and uprooting and snapping numerous other trees. The tornado continued to inflict damage to trees across central portions of Belle Isle before crossing into Canada on the other side of the Detroit River, uprooting trees and significantly damaging a home in Windsor at EF1 strength before dissipating. Along its path, one person was injured. This was the first tornado to strike the city of Detroit since 1997.						

=== September 5 event ===
List of confirmed tornadoes – Saturday, September 5, 2026
EF#	Location	County / Parish	State	Start Coord.	Time (UTC)	Path length	Max width
EF1	Sneads Ferry (1st tornado)	Onslow	NC	34.5299°N 77.4471°W	22:37–22:42	0.9 mi (1.4 km)	50 yd (46 m)
EF1	This tornado first touched down in a marshland before moving southeast near a subdivision, inflicting damage to trees and homes, with fences being blown over. The tornado then tracked through an apartment complex, with one unit having its roof decking partially torn away. Nearby trees were snapped, with some falling on and damaging other buildings. The tornado then brushed an RV park, inflicting damage to more trees and some RVs. The tornado then partially uplifted and damaged a car and inflicted minor damage to a library before dissipating as it approached NC 210.						
EF0	Sneads Ferry (2nd tornado)	Onslow	NC	34.5534°N 77.4388°W	22:41–22:47	1.6 mi (2.6 km)	50 yd (46 m)
EF0	This brief tornado touched down just west of NC 210, inflicting minor damage to trees as it moved southeastward across the highway. The tornado then struck a residence on the western side of the highway, inflicting significant damage to the roof and front wall, with debris being thrown 100 yards (91 m) away into nearby trees. The tornado then dissipated as it tracked over a business and minorly damaged trees.						

=== September 7 event ===
List of confirmed tornadoes – Monday, September 7, 2026
EF#	Location	County / Parish	State	Start Coord.	Time (UTC)	Path length	Max width
EF0	WSW of Hammond	Tangipahoa	LA	30.5033°N 90.4968°W	19:39–19:43	0.77 mi (1.24 km)	40 yd (37 m)
EF0	This weak tornado caused minor tree damage and collapsed a wall of a small building before dissipating.						
EF0	SE of Gross to N of Lynch	Boyd	NE	42.92°N 98.49°W	00:31–00:39	1.77 mi (2.85 km)	25 yd (23 m)
EF0	A few trees were damaged by this weak tornado.						

=== September 9 event ===
List of confirmed tornadoes – Wednesday, September 9, 2026
EF#	Location	County / Parish	State	Start Coord.	Time (UTC)	Path length	Max width
EF1	SW of Cyclone	McKean	PA	41.8097°N 78.6272°W	23:19–23:22	1.23 mi (1.98 km)	200 yd (180 m)
EF1	Numerous trees were snapped or uprooted and a trailer was flipped onto its side. This was the first tornado to hit McKean County since 2003.						
EF0	E of New Concord to WSW of Cambridge	Guernsey	OH	40.0057°N 81.6705°W	02:34–02:37	1.14 mi (1.83 km)	50 yd (46 m)
EF0	This high-end EF0 tornado touched down near US 22, immediately knocking down a tree and damaging several buildings. The most significant damage occurred at a small business where a door was blown out and an old steeple was knocked off from the roof of the building. A nearby trailer also was briefly lifted and displaced about 10 ft (3.0 m). Debris damaged a neighboring property's fence and yard, while siding and gutters were also damaged. A small sign was blown down across US 22 and minor tree damage occurred along I-70 before the tornado lifted.						

=== September 10 event ===
List of confirmed tornadoes – Thursday, September 10, 2026
EF#	Location	County / Parish	State	Start Coord.	Time (UTC)	Path length	Max width
EFU	SE of Toluca to W of Rutland	Marshall	IL	40.9789°N 89.0999°W	20:34–20:36	0.57 mi (0.92 km)	20 yd (18 m)
EFU	A tornado was recorded in a farm field. No damage was documented.						
EFU	SE of Godley	Will	IL	41.2206°N 88.2179°W	20:40–20:43	0.32 mi (0.51 km)	10 yd (9.1 m)
EFU	A waterspout was photographed over a cooling pond for the Braidwood Nuclear Generating Station. It remained over water and caused no damage.						

=== September 11 event ===
List of confirmed tornadoes – Friday, September 11, 2026
EF#	Location	County / Parish	State	Start Coord.	Time (UTC)	Path length	Max width
EFU	SSE of Chokio to SSW of Alberta	Stevens	MN	45.46°N 96.12°W	00:44–00:48	1.04 mi (1.67 km)	45 yd (41 m)
EFU	Numerous storm chasers documented a multi-vortex tornado that tracked through corn and bean fields. No damage occurred.						

=== September 12 event ===
List of confirmed tornadoes – Saturday, September 12, 2026
EF#	Location	County / Parish	State	Start Coord.	Time (UTC)	Path length	Max width
EF0	Spring Grove to E of Cabin Point	Surry	VA	37.159°N 76.961°W	20:41–20:46	2.7 mi (4.3 km)	
EF0	A weak tornado damaged trees along SR 10.						

=== September 14 event ===
List of confirmed tornadoes – Monday, September 14, 2026
EF#	Location	County / Parish	State	Start Coord.	Time (UTC)	Path length	Max width
EF0	S of Avoca	Otoe	NE	40.768°N 96.1562°W	23:49–23:53	2.83 mi (4.55 km)	10 yd (9.1 m)
EF0	A weak tornado flattened a path through a cornfield, tipped over a large metal storage tank, and snapped large branches off of trees.						

=== September 17 event ===
List of confirmed tornadoes – Thursday, September 17, 2026
EF#	Location	County / Parish	State	Start Coord.	Time (UTC)	Path length	Max width
EFU	NNE of Chappell	Garden	NE	41.24°N 102.38°W	00:34		
EFU	A brief tornado was documented. No damage was observed.						

=== September 18 event ===
List of confirmed tornadoes – Friday, September 18, 2026
EF#	Location	County / Parish	State	Start Coord.	Time (UTC)	Path length	Max width
EF2	E of Fruit Heights to SW of Peterson	Davis, Morgan	UT	41.0331°N 111.8845°W	19:44–20:00	5.93 mi (9.54 km)	1,900 yd (1,700 m)
EF2	This strong and very large tornado first touched down near Bair Canyon, inflicting mainly low-end damage to pine and aspen tree groves, with pockets of significant damage along the southern side of the canyon, where numerous pine trees were downed, with some being stripped of leaves and having their tops sheared away. The tornado tracked over Francis Peak, reaching an elevation of 9,500 feet (2.9 km), with numerous pine trees being snapped. As the tornado tracked down Francis Peak, it turned to the northeast, inflicting strong damage to numerous trees near Middle Smith Lake, with many being snapped at the base or having their tops removed. The tornado then widened to a width of 1,900 yards (1.1 mi; 1.7 km), becoming the widest tornado on record for the state of Utah. The tornado inflicted some damage to more trees near Dalton Creek, with many being snapped at the base or flattened. The tornado then began to weaken and narrow, continuing to inflict widespread tree damage before dissipating. This is the first officially documented tornado in Morgan County since reliable records began in 1950.						
EFU	SSE of Jensen	Uintah	UT	40.28°N 109.28°W	23:00–23:05		
EFU	An EFU tornado was confirmed by NWS Grand Junction. Preliminary information.						

=== September 25 event ===
List of confirmed tornadoes – Sunday, September 25, 2026
EF#	Location	County / Parish	State	Start Coord.	Time (UTC)	Path length	Max width
EFU	SE of Wilmore	Comanche	KS	37.33°N 99.2°W	22:45		
EFU	A tornado was reported by local law enforcement. No damage was found.						

=== September 29 event ===
List of confirmed tornadoes – Tuesday, September 29, 2026
EF#	Location	County / Parish	State	Start Coord.	Time (UTC)	Path length	Max width
EFU	WNW of Dodge City	Ford	KS	37.81°N 100.14°W	00:10		
EFU	Several pictures and videos were taken of a brief tornado. No damage occurred.						
EFU	SE of Claude	Armstrong	TX	35.0658°N 101.3167°W	00:12–00:15	0.98 mi (1.58 km)	75 yd (69 m)
EFU	Storm spotters recorded and photographed a tornado that remained over open land.						
EFU	W of Rockwell Place	Randall	TX	35.0752°N 101.95°W	02:37–02:43	0.59 mi (0.95 km)	25 yd (23 m)
EFU	This tornado remained nearly stationary in an open field. No damage occurred.						

=== September 30 event ===
List of confirmed tornadoes – Wednesday, September 30, 2026
EF#	Location	County / Parish	State	Start Coord.	Time (UTC)	Path length	Max width
EF0	Southern Key Largo	Monroe	FL	25.0527°N 80.4798°W	16:00–16:01	0.07 mi (0.11 km)	25 yd (23 m)
EF0	This waterspout moved ashore in the Silver Shores neighborhood in southern Key Largo, where it demolished a porch. A large metal roof panel was torn away and carried about 500 ft (150 m) before becoming lodged 30–40 ft (9.1–12.2 m) above the ground in a tree. The tornado quickly dissipated.						
EFU	SE of Rozel	Pawnee	KS	38.15°N 99.35°W	20:30		
EFU	A brief tornado remained over an open field.						
EFU	NW of Larned (1st tornado)	Pawnee	KS	38.26°N 99.23°W	20:49–20:51	1.16 mi (1.87 km)	
EFU	This tornado tracked through fields causing no damage.						
EFU	NW of Larned (2nd tornado)	Pawnee	KS	38.29°N 99.2°W	20:53–20:57	1.59 mi (2.56 km)	
EFU	Multiple storm chasers observed a tornado that inflicted no damage.						
EFU	N of Olmitz	Barton	KS	38.5554°N 98.9316°W	21:49–21:59	5.99 mi (9.64 km)	50 yd (46 m)
EFU	This tornado occurred over mostly open fields causing no damage.						
EF0	W of Susank	Barton, Russell	KS	38.6393°N 98.8595°W	21:58–22:08	5.69 mi (9.16 km)	100 yd (91 m)
EF0	This tornado hit an abandoned farmstead, tossing sheet metal into a fence several yards away.						
EFU	WNW of Dorrance	Russell	KS	38.8593°N 98.6417°W	22:51–22:53	0.69 mi (1.11 km)	5 yd (4.6 m)
EFU	This tornado briefly touched down causing no damage.						
EF0	NNE of Dorrance	Russell	KS	38.9418°N 98.556°W	23:20–23:28	5.62 mi (9.04 km)	20 yd (18 m)
EF0	This tornado touched down over Wilson Lake, turning north and causing damage to outbuildings on a farmstead before lifting. The tornado likely had several condensation funnel touchdowns based on storm spotter reports and video.						
EF0	W of Sylvan Grove	Lincoln	KS	39.0181°N 98.4553°W	23:28–23:32	2.02 mi (3.25 km)	20 yd (18 m)
EF0	This tornado took shingles off a house and damaged a portion of the fence. A cattle feeder was rolled 50 feet (15 m).						
EFU	NW of Sylvan Grove	Lincoln	KS	39.0366°N 98.4296°W	23:38–23:51	5.13 mi (8.26 km)	50 yd (46 m)
EFU	This tornado tracked over open fields, causing no damage. The tornado likely had several condensation funnel touchdowns based on storm spotter video.						
EFU	SSW of Ash Grove	Lincoln	KS	39.1072°N 98.3772°W	23:53–00:18	10.01 mi (16.11 km)	80 yd (73 m)
EFU	This longer-lived multi-vortex tornado tracked over open fields causing no damage.						
EFU	WNW of Ash Grove	Lincoln	KS	39.1909°N 98.3949°W	00:20–00:26	2.15 mi (3.46 km)	40 yd (37 m)
EFU	This tornado tracked over open fields causing no damage.						
EFU	E of Hunter	Mitchell	KS	39.2301°N 98.2601°W	00:23		
EFU	A brief tornado was photographed and caused no damage.						

== See also ==
- Tornadoes of 2026
- List of United States tornadoes from May to June 2026
- List of United States tornadoes from October to November 2026
