= Little Chicago =

Little Chicago may refer to:

- Little Chicago (novel), a 2002 novel by Adam Rapp
- Little Chicago, Minnesota, an unincorporated community
- Little Chicago, Ohio, an unincorporated community
- Little Chicago Prospect, an oil and natural gas deposit in the Northwest Territories, Canada
- Little Chicago, South Carolina, an unincorporated community
- Little Chicago, Wisconsin, an unincorporated community
- Moore Haven, Florida, a nickname for the city
