= Raven Rock =

Raven Rock and Raven Rocks may refer to:

- Raven Rock (Kentucky), a sandstone protrusion
- Raven Rock, New Jersey, an unincorporated community
- Raven Rock, West Virginia, an unincorporated community in Pleasant County
- Raven Rocks, West Virginia, an unincorporated community in Hampshire County
- Raven Rocks (rock formation), West Virginia
- Raven Rock State Park, North Carolina
- Raven Rock Mountain Complex, Pennsylvania, an American military installation
- Raven Rock in Rockefeller State Park Preserve, New York, a "haunted place" mentioned in Washington Irving's The Legend of Sleepy Hollow
- Raven Rock, a fictional settlement in the video game The Elder Scrolls V: Dragonborn
- Raven Rock: The Story of the U.S. Government's Secret Plan to Save Itself—While the Rest of Us Die, a book about Raven Rock Mountain Complex by Garrett M. Graff
