= Mechanicsville, Virginia (disambiguation) =

Mechanicsville is the name of four places in the Commonwealth of Virginia in the United States of America:

- Mechanicsville, Hanover County, Virginia
- Mechanicsville, Loudoun County, Virginia
- Mechanicsville, Rockbridge County, Virginia
- Mechanicsville, Rockingham County, Virginia
