= List of United States tornadoes from October to November 2026 =

United States tornadoes from October to November 2026
- EF2 damage to trees in Candor, North Carolina
- Timespan: October 10 – current
- Maximum rated tornado: EF2 tornado: List; Barnwell, South Carolina on October 10; Blair, South Carolina on October 11; Candor, North Carolina on October 11; Fayetteville, North Carolina on October 11; Duplin County, North Carolina on October 11
- Tornadoes: ~52
- Fatalities: 0
- Injuries: 2

This page documents all tornadoes confirmed by various weather forecast offices of the National Weather Service in the United States from October to November 2026. Tornado counts are considered preliminary until final publication in the database of the National Centers for Environmental Information. On average, there are 59 confirmed tornadoes in October and 54 in November.

In October, tornado activity continues to wane compared to earlier months due to drier and colder air pushing farther south, with activity most common in states along the Gulf Coast. Tornadoes in November are more likely in the southern states due to their proximity to the unstable airmass and warm waters of the Gulf of Mexico, with occasional incursions farther north into the Midwest.

October finished with a below average total of 40 confirmed tornadoes for the month. Most tornadic activity was sparse and infrequent aside from a relatively potent outbreak early in the month spawned by the remnants of Hurricane Isaias.

== October ==
Confirmed tornadoes by Enhanced Fujita rating
EFU	EF0	EF1	EF2	EF3	EF4	EF5	Total
2	16	17	5	0	0	0	40

=== October 9 event ===
List of confirmed tornadoes – Friday, October 9, 2026 (Note: All dates are based on the local time zone where the tornado touched down; however, all times are in Coordinated Universal Time for consistency.)
EF#	Location	County / Parish	State	Start Coord.	Time (UTC)	Path length	Max width
EF0	Eastern Eastpoint	Franklin	FL	29.7573°N 84.8324°W	21:42–21:46	0.97 mi (1.56 km)	230 yd (210 m)
EF0	This tornadic waterspout moved ashore near the US 98/SR 65 intersection and inflicted minor damage to homes before dissipating.						

=== October 10 event ===
List of confirmed tornadoes – Saturday, October 10, 2026
EF#	Location	County / Parish	State	Start Coord.	Time (UTC)	Path length	Max width
EF0	E of Statesboro	Bulloch	GA	32.46°N 81.67°W	18:12–18:13	1.05 mi (1.69 km)	25 yd (23 m)
EF0	A high-end EF0 tornado uprooted large trees, snapped large tree branches, and damaged a pivot irrigation system.						
EF0	WNW of Newington	Screven	GA	32.6009°N 81.5784°W	18:42–18:46	1.51 mi (2.43 km)	25 yd (23 m)
EF0	This tornado snapped off branches of hardwood and softwood trees and a standalone garage's tin roof was peeled off.						
EF1	SW of Newington to E of Sylvania	Screven	GA	32.5714°N 81.5427°W	19:12–19:36	10.54 mi (16.96 km)	200 yd (180 m)
EF1	This tornado caused extensive tree damage; numerous large trees, both hardwood and softwood, were either snapped or uprooted. A mobile home and several cars were crushed by falling trees.						
EF1	W of Waynesboro	Burke	GA	33.09°N 82.1319°W	19:30–19:44	3.03 mi (4.88 km)	350 yd (320 m)
EF1	This tornado caused significant damage to a farmstead, including roof damage, uprooted trees, a toppled center-pivot irrigation system, and multiple tipped over 18-wheeler trailers. Subsequent damage was primarily to trees and tree limbs.						
EF1	W of Allendale	Allendale	SC	32.945°N 81.3965°W	20:15–20:28	5.58 mi (8.98 km)	350 yd (320 m)
EF1	This tornado significantly damaged four homes. One home had its aluminum roofing and front porch damaged, another had complete roof and outer wall failure, and the other two had minor roofing damage. Additionally, two carports and an outbuilding were destroyed. The tornado continued north into wooded areas and caused tree damage.						
EF1	N of Appleton to western Kline	Allendale, Barnwell	SC	33.0771°N 81.3612°W	20:34–20:49	5.07 mi (8.16 km)	200 yd (180 m)
EF1	A tornado touched down in a wooded area and rapidly tracked northward, snapping and uprooting clusters of hardwood and softwood trees along its path. It continued north into Barnwell County, passing through the western outskirts of Kline and producing additional tree damage in forested areas before dissipating.						
EF2	N of Kline to Barnwell to Williston	Barnwell	SC	33.1579°N 81.3550°W	20:49–21:27	18.04 mi (29.03 km)	100 yd (91 m)
EF2	This strong tornado caused sporadic tree damage along its lengthy path; multiple hardwood trees were uprooted or snapped and power poles were downed.						
EF1	W of Wagener	Aiken	SC	33.6127°N 81.4597°W	20:49–21:23	3.22 mi (5.18 km)	150 yd (140 m)
EF1	This tornado sporadically snapped and uprooted trees.						

=== October 11 event ===
List of confirmed tornadoes – Sunday, October 11, 2026
EF#	Location	County / Parish	State	Start Coord.	Time (UTC)	Path length	Max width
EF2	W of Blair	Newberry, Fairfield	SC	34.4083°N 81.4342°W	10:05–10:10	2.66 mi (4.28 km)	450 yd (410 m)
EF2	A strong tornado occurred within southern portions of Sumter National Forest and initially snapped and uprooted several pine trees before moving northeast through a wooded area where numerous more trees were damaged. At one residence, several large pine trees were snapped or uprooted and a small camper was overturned. The tornado strengthened as it approached the Broad River, destroying large portions of the surrounding forest, with numerous pine trees snapped and several power poles brought down by falling trees and power lines. The tornado then crossed the Broad River, snapping more trees before dissipating in a densely forested area.						
EF2	Northeastern Candor	Montgomery	NC	35.2999°N 79.7369°W	14:14–14:15	0.62 mi (1.00 km)	125 yd (114 m)
EF2	This short-lived but strong tornado formed and downed numerous trees before tracking northeast, reaching peak intensity as it collapsed three walls of a community center and snapped nearby softwood trees. The tornado then tracked across a small pond, snapping more trees and damaging the roof of a residence before dissipating right before reaching I-73/I-74/US 220. This is the first tornado that has occurred in Montgomery County since 2004.						
EF2	Northwestern Fayetteville	Cumberland	NC	35.0713°N 78.969°W	15:56–16:05	5.3 mi (8.5 km)	150 yd (140 m)
EF2	This strong tornado touched down and knocked over several trees and tore away HVAC units from a business before likely lifting briefly and touching back down. The tornado then intensifed as it passed over a Walmart, removing around 10 HVAC units from the roof. The tornado then passed between two hotels, bending two poles, damaging roofs, and rolling a couple of cars. The tornado then tracked through a parking lot, displacing and lifting around a dozen vehicles, with one person sustaining a minor injury. The tornado then weakened and produced intermittent damage, with one area having around a dozen trees snapped. The tornado continued to inflict damage, crossing a lake and snapping more trees before lifting prior to reaching I-295.						
EF1	W of New Hill	Chatham	NC	35.6804°N 79.0098°W	16:02–16:03	1.07 mi (1.72 km)	50 yd (46 m)
EF1	A high-end EF1 tornado snapped numerous trees along the southeastern shoreline of Jordan Lake.						
EF0	NE of Clarendon	Columbus	NC	34.2336°N 78.822°W	16:03–16:04	0.13 mi (0.21 km)	20 yd (18 m)
EF0	This brief and narrow tornado destroyed several open farm buildings and shifted an empty grain bin off its foundation. Sheet metal roofing was scattered into tree canopies and fields along its path.						
EF1	WNW of Linden	Cumberland, Harnett	NC	35.2595°N 78.7787°W	16:23–16:30	2.36 mi (3.80 km)	100 yd (91 m)
EF1	A tornado touched down just west of Linden and tracked northeast inflicting minor roof and fence damage to several homes. The most significant damage occurred in a residential area where several homes had approximately half of their windows blown out, fence posts embedded in concrete were pulled from the ground, and windblown timber punctured exterior walls. The tornado continued northeast across an open field, leaving a visible path through a dormant cornfield and snapping or uprooting several softwood trees. Further along its path, additional trees were knocked down and an anchored carport was torn from the ground and thrown 30–50 yd (27–46 m). The tornado then crossed a small pond, knocking down a few more trees before dissipating over a former airstrip.						
EF1	Western Cary	Wake	NC	35.8147°N 78.865°W	16:29–16:30	0.37 mi (0.60 km)	50 yd (46 m)
EF1	A large tree and multiple large tree branches were snapped.						
EF0	NE of Clegg	Wake	NC	35.8788°N 78.8153°W	16:40	0.16 mi (0.26 km)	50 yd (46 m)
EF0	This very brief tornado snapped a tree and uprooted others						
EF0	Western East Arcadia	Bladen	NC	34.3718°N 78.3429°W	16:54–16:58	1.68 mi (2.70 km)	235 yd (215 m)
EF0	This broad and intermittent tornado damaged trees.						
EF1	Northeastern Raleigh	Wake	NC	35.8492°N 78.5401°W	17:12–17:17	2.51 mi (4.04 km)	150 yd (140 m)
EF1	This tornado touched down on the northeast outskirts of Raleigh and began to snap multiple trees and uplifted a trampoline before crossing I-540. Reaching maximum intensity, several homes sustained roof damage and numerous hardwood trees were snapped and uprooted. The tornado then weakened and dissipated shortly after.						
EF0	Eastern Clayton	Johnston	NC	35.6341°N 78.4423°W	17:15–17:22	3.33 mi (5.36 km)	75 yd (69 m)
EF0	An intermittent tornado snapped and uprooted trees, broke large branches, and caused minor shingle and roof damage to several homes and other structures. Numerous fences were blown over and several power poles were snapped or knocked down. In Clayton, the tornado also damaged patio furniture and signage at a gas station near the intersection of NC 36/NC 42 and US 70 before dissipating.						
EF0	SE of Harrells	Sampson	NC	34.6912°N 78.1654°W	17:25–17:27	1.17 mi (1.88 km)	30 yd (27 m)
EF0	This brief tornado snapped tree branches.						
EF1	SW of Louisburg	Franklin	NC	36.0465°N 78.3702°W	17:40–17:47	3.85 mi (6.20 km)	130 yd (120 m)
EF1	This high-end EF1 tornado uprooted multiple softwood and hardwood trees. A barn also lost the majority of its roof and fencing.						
EF2	Northern Wallace to Beulaville to Potters Hill	Duplin	NC	34.7395°N 78.0342°W	17:38–18:27	24.43 mi (39.32 km)	150 yd (140 m)
EF2	A strong tornado initially touched down south of NC 41, snapping and uprooting several trees and causing minor damage to a home before crossing the highway where additional trees were snapped and a farm outbuilding sustained roof damage. The tornado rapidly intensified, completely displacing a well-anchored two-car garage from its foundation, embedding a large branch into a nearby home's roof, and severely damaging a metal building whose heavy doors were torn off and thrown over the residence. Continuing northeast across US 117 and I-40, the tornado snapped additional trees, damaged multiple farms, bent power poles, and broke windows at a church. After crossing NC 50, the tornado intensified again, shifting an attached garage off its foundation and dragging a nearby truck while several large hardwood trees were snapped at their bases. Further northeast, the tornado produced significant damage at a pig farm, completely destroying a barn and ripping a feed silo weighing over 1,000 pounds (450 kg) from its concrete anchors. The tornado continued through inaccessible wooded and swampy areas toward Beulaville where additional trees were snapped and uprooted before the damage became more sporadic. Minor damage occurred in Beulaville and the final documented damage consisted of minor roof damage in Potters Hill where the tornado then dissipated.						
EF1	SSE of Kinston	Jones	NC	35.1018°N 77.5592°W	18:48–18:56	3.52 mi (5.66 km)	125 yd (114 m)
EF1	This tornado completely destroyed an outbuilding. Trees and power lines were also damaged.						

=== October 13 event ===
List of confirmed tornadoes – Tuesday, October 13, 2026
EF#	Location	County / Parish	State	Start Coord.	Time (UTC)	Path length	Max width
EF0	W of Arboles	La Plata	CO	37.01°N 107.53°W	22:25–22:30	1.53 mi (2.46 km)	50 yd (46 m)
EF0	An EF0 tornado was confirmed by NWS Grand Junction. Preliminary information. This is the first tornado spotted in La Plata County since 2004.						
EFU	W of Hardtner	Barber	KS	37.01°N 98.69°W	22:32		
EFU	Several storm chasers documented a brief, weak tornado. No damage was noted.						

=== October 14 event ===
List of confirmed tornadoes – Wednesday, October 14, 2026
EF#	Location	County / Parish	State	Start Coord.	Time (UTC)	Path length	Max width
EF0	Southern Fort Stockton	Pecos	TX	30.8801°N 102.8822°W	19:16–19:18	0.62 mi (1.00 km)	30 yd (27 m)
EF0	This high-end EF0 tornado peeled off metal roofing and snapped several large tree branches on the south side of Fort Stockton.						
EF1	NE of Fort Stockton	Pecos	TX	30.9125°N 102.8459°W	19:23–19:34	3.4 mi (5.5 km)	125 yd (114 m)
EF1	A tornado removed metal paneling from an outbuilding and damaged mesquite trees.						

=== October 15 event ===
List of confirmed tornadoes – Thursday, October 15, 2026
EF#	Location	County / Parish	State	Start Coord.	Time (UTC)	Path length	Max width
EFU	S of Russellville	Lawrence	IL	38.7849°N 87.5775°W	22:58–23:04	3.6 mi (5.8 km)	20 yd (18 m)
EFU	Several storm chasers observed a tornado that caused no known damage.						

=== October 21 event ===
List of confirmed tornadoes – Wednesday, October 21, 2026
EF#	Location	County / Parish	State	Start Coord.	Time (UTC)	Path length	Max width
EF1	N of Bellemont	Coconino	AZ	35.287°N 111.8104°W	12:41–12:51	2.34 mi (3.77 km)	600 yd (550 m)
EF1	Several pine trees were snapped or uprooted.						
EF1	S of Prescott	Yavapai	AZ	34.4534°N 112.4141°W	14:41–14:46	4.31 mi (6.94 km)	350 yd (320 m)
EF1	This tornado moved through the Prescott National Forest and snapped or uprooted several swaths of pine trees.						
EF0	W of Forest Lakes	Coconino	AZ	34.3128°N 110.9107°W	01:15–01:18	1.43 mi (2.30 km)	370 yd (340 m)
EF0	A high-end EF0 tornado uprooted several pine trees just north of SR 260 within Sitgreaves National Forest.						
EF1	Eastern Heber–Overgaard	Navajo	AZ	34.333°N 110.5766°W	01:56–02:07	7.71 mi (12.41 km)	350 yd (320 m)
EF1	A high-end EF1 tornado developed south of Heber–Overgaard and moved northward, crossing SR 260 into the community. Numerous trees were snapped or uprooted and multiple roofs of homes were damaged. One person was injured.						

=== October 22 event ===
List of confirmed tornadoes – Thursday, October 22, 2026
EF#	Location	County / Parish	State	Start Coord.	Time (UTC)	Path length	Max width
EF1	E of San Mateo	McKinley	NM	35.3385°N 107.5115°W	21:52–21:55	1.2 mi (1.9 km)	150 yd (140 m)
EF1	A tornadic scar was documented via satellite imagery in high terrain within the Cibola National Forest. Numerous trees were snapped or uprooted.						

=== October 24 event ===
List of confirmed tornadoes – Saturday, October 24, 2026
EF#	Location	County / Parish	State	Start Coord.	Time (UTC)	Path length	Max width
EF0	NE of Alto	Lincoln	NM	33.43°N 105.64°W	23:15	0.09 mi (0.14 km)	50 yd (46 m)
EF0	A weak tornado minorly damaged a home, blew in garage and shed doors, and uprooted trees.						
EF1	Southern Santa Fe	Santa Fe	NM	35.6228°N 105.9791°W	01:00–01:08	2.25 mi (3.62 km)	100 yd (91 m)
EF1	This high-end EF1 tornado touched down south of I-25 and moved northward into the Via Caballero neighborhood in southern Santa Fe. Along its path, the tornado snapped power poles, uprooted and damaged numerous trees, and caused roof damage to several residences. A total of ten homes sustained damage before the tornado dissipated.						

=== October 29 event ===
List of confirmed tornadoes – Thursday, October 29, 2026
EF#	Location	County / Parish	State	Start Coord.	Time (UTC)	Path length	Max width
EF0	W of Uvalde	Uvalde	TX	29.2401°N 100.0199°W	23:04–23:10	1.8 mi (2.9 km)	40 yd (37 m)
EF0	A weak tornado remained over open ranchland and damaged vegetation.						
EF0	WNW of Uvalde	Uvalde	TX	29.3184°N 100.0823°W	23:25–23:33	2.1 mi (3.4 km)	50 yd (46 m)
EF0	This tornado damaged foliage across rural lands.						
EF0	NE of Brackettville	Kinney	TX	29.4269°N 100.1753°W	23:52–23:58	2.36 mi (3.80 km)	50 yd (46 m)
EF0	This tornado occurred over open land, damaging vegetation.						
EF0	NNE of Brackettville	Kinney	TX	29.4589°N 100.3334°W	23:54–23:58	1.23 mi (1.98 km)	50 yd (46 m)
EF0	Damage was limited to vegetation across ranchland.						

== November ==
Confirmed tornadoes by Enhanced Fujita rating
EFU	EF0	EF1	EF2	EF3	EF4	EF5	Total
0	6	6	0	0	0	0	12

=== November 1 event ===
List of confirmed tornadoes – Sunday, November 1, 2026
EF#	Location	County / Parish	State	Start Coord.	Time (UTC)	Path length	Max width
EF1	Keyes	Cimarron	OK	36.8059°N 102.2592°W	04:59–05:03	0.61 mi (0.98 km)	25 yd (23 m)
EF1	A tornado touched down on the southwestern side of Keyes, snapping several tree branches and shifting an anchored mobile home a few feet off its original position. Continuing northeast, the tornado lifted an empty grain silo and carried or rolled it approximately 100 yd (91 m) across a field while also snapping the top of a power pole. The tornado then damaged the roof of a community center, collapsed one of its walls, destroyed an awning connecting two buildings, and broke another power pole. Further northeast, a carport awning was damaged and several tree branches and a softwood tree were snapped. The most significant damage occurred in northeastern Keyes, where an old pool hall collapsed and a nearby building lost its roof, resulting in the collapse of an exterior wall. The tornado also damaged a large barn-like structure before dissipating.						

=== November 2 event ===
List of confirmed tornadoes – Monday, November 2, 2026
EF#	Location	County / Parish	State	Start Coord.	Time (UTC)	Path length	Max width
EF0	W of Rutland	Lake	SD	44.0809°N 97.05°W	21:08–21:09	0.18 mi (0.29 km)	25 yd (23 m)
EF0	A weak tornado broke a tree and caused minor damage to other trees. This is the first documented tornado to occur in South Dakota in the month of November since reliable records began in 1950.						

=== November 3 event ===
List of confirmed tornadoes – Tuesday, November 3, 2026
EF#	Location	County / Parish	State	Start Coord.	Time (UTC)	Path length	Max width
EF0	NW of Oologah to SW of Talala	Rogers	OK	36.484°N 95.764°W	05:16–05:20	2.7 mi (4.3 km)	275 yd (251 m)
EF0	A high-end EF0 snapped numerous large tree limbs.						
EF1	ENE of Adair to SSW of Big Cabin	Mayes	OK	36.449°N 95.248°W	07:10–07:14	3.1 mi (5.0 km)	500 yd (460 m)
EF1	This tornado uprooted several trees, damaged a home and an outbuilding, and snapped power poles.						
EF1	W of Cedarville to SSE of Natural Dam	Crawford	AR	35.572°N 94.4°W	08:15–08:20	2.9 mi (4.7 km)	175 yd (160 m)
EF1	A tornado traversed through rugged terrain, uprooting and snapping several trees along with breaking multiple large tree branches.						
EF0	NE of Mooringsport to W of Belcher	Caddo	LA	32.7348°N 93.9096°W	16:17–16:18	1.76 mi (2.83 km)	50 yd (46 m)
EF0	A large tree was downed by this tornado that was photographed by a storm chaser.						
EF1	W of Clark	Randolph	MO	39.2815°N 92.4038°W	16:42–16:44	1.05 mi (1.69 km)	50 yd (46 m)
EF1	This tornado struck a farmstead and damaged trees, farm equipment and farm outbuildings.						
EF0	W of Keachi	DeSoto, Caddo	LA	32.1811°N 94.0299°W	17:21–17:27	3.38 mi (5.44 km)	150 yd (140 m)
EF0	Light tree damage occurred.						

=== November 11 event ===
List of confirmed tornadoes – Wednesday, November 11, 2026
EF#	Location	County / Parish	State	Start Coord.	Time (UTC)	Path length	Max width
EF0	SW of Riley	Vigo	IN	39.3601°N 87.3264°W	22:27–22:29	1.1 mi (1.8 km)	25 yd (23 m)
EF0	This weak tornado damaged a barn and shifted an RV off its foundation before lifting near SR 159.						

=== November 12 event ===
List of confirmed tornadoes – Thursday, November 12, 2026
EF#	Location	County / Parish	State	Start Coord.	Time (UTC)	Path length	Max width
EF1	E of Newark	New Castle	DE	39.6393°N 75.7015°W	18:05–18:15	4.4 mi (7.1 km)	175 yd (160 m)
EF1	Many homes suffered varying degrees of roof and siding damage with some also having windows blown out, and trees were uprooted or had large branches broken off. In the latter part of the path, a hotel sign fell on multiple parked cars, a semi-truck was overturned on I-95, and two helicopters at the Christiana Hospital were damaged.						
EF1	W of Chesterfield	Burlington	NJ	40.1309°N 74.6613°W	21:00–21:05	1.5 mi (2.4 km)	100 yd (91 m)
EF1	A tornado developed southwest of Chesterfield, completely collapsing the exterior walls of a barn and causing minor fascia and roof shingle damage to a nearby residence. It continued northward along a narrow path, snapping or uprooting numerous trees, causing several wooden power poles to lean, and damaging multiple homes. The tornado then turned southeast, partially lifting the roof off a residence and scattering roofing materials and wooden beams into surrounding yards, with one beam becoming lodged in the soffit of a neighboring home. Further along its path, additional hardwood trees were snapped before the tornado struck a school, removing a portion of its roof and overturning nearby farm equipment. The tornado produced its final observed damage shortly afterward, snapping several large tree branches near a residence.						

=== November 14 event ===
List of confirmed tornadoes – Saturday, November 14, 2026
EF#	Location	County / Parish	State	Start Coord.	Time (UTC)	Path length	Max width
EF0	W of Lamesa	Gaines	TX	32.73°N 102.25°W	23:59		
EF0	A tornado was photographed. No damage occurred.						
EF1	NNW of Lamesa	Dawson	TX	32.7884°N 101.9947°W	00:33–00:34	0.08 mi (0.13 km)	30 yd (27 m)
EF1	This brief tornado occurred just west of SH 137 and destroyed a metal outbuilding and fencing. A tree was snapped and a couple of trailers were also tossed.						

== See also ==
- Tornadoes of 2026
- List of United States tornadoes from July to September 2026
