= Spring Valley Colony, South Dakota =

- Census-designated place
- Location within South Dakota Location within the United States
- Coordinates: 44°02′23″N 98°53′20″W
- Country: United States
- State: South Dakota
- County: Jerauld

Area
  - Total: 0.48 sq mi (1.25 km^{2})
  - Land: 0.48 sq mi (1.25 km^{2})
  - Water: 0 sq mi (0.00 km^{2})
- Elevation: 1,641 ft (500 m)

Population (2020)
  - Total: 0
  - Density: 0/sq mi (0/km^{2})
- Time zone: UTC-6 (Central (CST))
  - Summer (DST): UTC-5 (CDT)
- ZIP Code: 57382 (Wessington Springs)
- Area code: 605
- FIPS code: 46-61180
- GNIS feature ID: 2807109

Spring Valley Colony is a Hutterite colony and census-designated place (CDP) in Jerauld County, South Dakota, United States. It was first listed as a CDP prior to the 2020 census. As of the 2020 census, Spring Valley Colony had a population of 0.

It is in the western part of the county, on the north side of a west-flowing tributary of Crow Creek, which in turn flows west to the Missouri River at Lake Francis Case. The colony is 19 miles (31 km) by road west-southwest of Wessington Springs, the Jerauld county seat.

== Demographics ==
Historical population
Census	Pop.	Note	%±
2020	0		—
U.S. Decennial Census
