= Morning Star, Virginia =

Unincorporated community in Virginia, US

Coordinates: 38°38′46″N 78°21′57″W

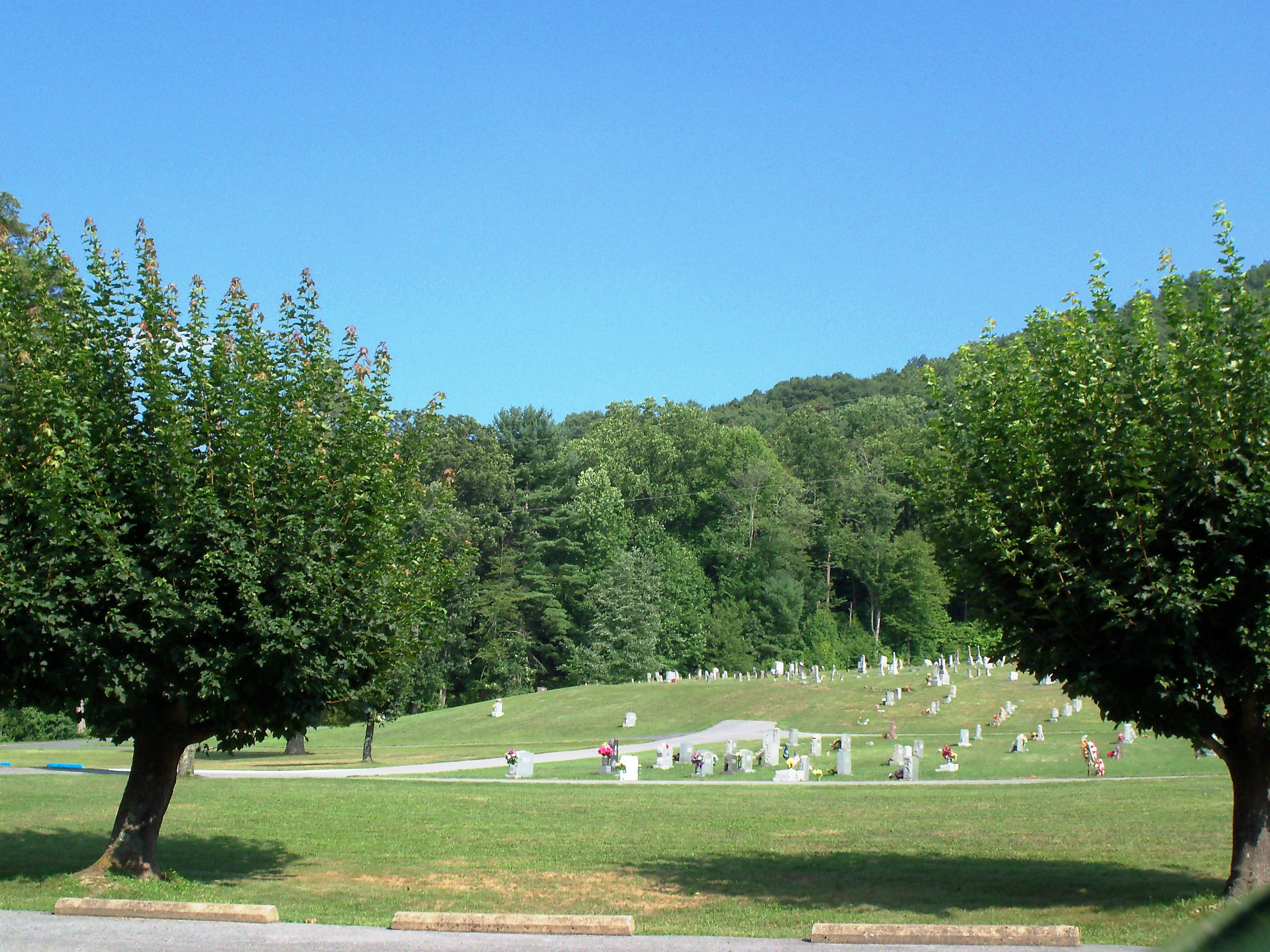
Cemetery in Morning Star

Morning Star is an unincorporated community in Page County, in the U.S. state of Virginia.
