= Little Chicago, South Carolina =

Unincorporated community in South Carolina, US

Coordinates: 35°03′45″N 82°11′01″W

Little Chicago is an unincorporated community in Spartanburg County, in the U.S. state of South Carolina.

== History ==
The community had once had a reputation for illicit liquor manufacturing and sales, earning it the moniker Little Chicago.
