= Little Chicago (novel) =

Novel by Adam Rapp

- First edition book cover
- Author: Adam Rapp
- Publisher: Front Street
- Publication date: April 15, 2002
- ISBN: 1-886910-72-3

Little Chicago is a 2002 novel by American writer Adam Rapp.

Little Chicago is a story told by eleven-year-old Gerald 'Blacky' Brown, a victim of sexual abuse and neglect living in Little Chicago, Wisconsin. Blacky is taken to hospital to be examined, tells a social worker about the molestation, and at school he tells his best (and only) friend, Eric Duggan.

But he is let down by the other characters. Blacky's mother wants to keep seeing her boyfriend; his sister has a serious drug problem; Wendy Wolf, the woman from the Children's Service, does not follow up on the allegations; and Blacky suffers associated bullying at school.

Blacky befriends Mary Jane Paddington, a lonely and very unpopular girl at school, and she encourages Blacky to resist the bullying, but she becomes the victim of a brutal prank. The girl’s friendship helped him, but he still suffers the cruelty at school and neglect at home. Eventually Blacky acquires a gun and two bullets and confronts two of the bullies.

Rapp, through the observations of the young boy, shows the terror, bewilderment, and behaviour changes that can result from child molestation if adults ignore it.

== See also ==
- Pedophilia
