= Mountain, West Virginia =

- Unincorporated community
- Location within West Virginia Location within the United States
- Coordinates: 39°21′43″N 80°54′37″W
- Country: United States
- State: West Virginia
- County: Ritchie
- Elevation: 860 ft (260 m)
- Time zone: UTC-5 (Eastern (EST))
  - Summer (DST): UTC-4 (EDT)
- Area codes: 304 & 681
- GNIS feature ID: 1543852

Mountain is an unincorporated community in Ritchie County, West Virginia, United States. Mountain is located in extreme northeastern Ritchie County along West Virginia Route 74 and the Hughes River, 6.2 miles (10.0 km) north-northeast of Pennsboro. The community was known as Mole Hill prior to 1949, when residents requested that the name be changed to Mountain as part of a publicity stunt to literally make a mountain out of a molehill. Despite the name, there is no mountain in or even visible from the community. The post office ultimately closed on November 9, 2002.

The community most likely was named after the local Mole family.
