= Thursday, West Virginia =

Thursday
- Unincorporated community
- Location within the state of West Virginia Thursday (the United States)
- Coordinates: 39°3′7″N 81°1′20″W
- Country: United States
- State: West Virginia
- County: Ritchie
- Elevation: 899 ft (274 m)
- Time zone: UTC-5 (Eastern (EST))
  - Summer (DST): UTC-4 (EDT)
- GNIS feature ID: 1548082

Thursday is an unincorporated community located in Ritchie County, West Virginia, United States. It is near the community of Burnt House.

The community's name origin specifically related to the date of a post office application, which was Thursday. The Post Office was established in 1921 and no longer exists.

== Gallery ==
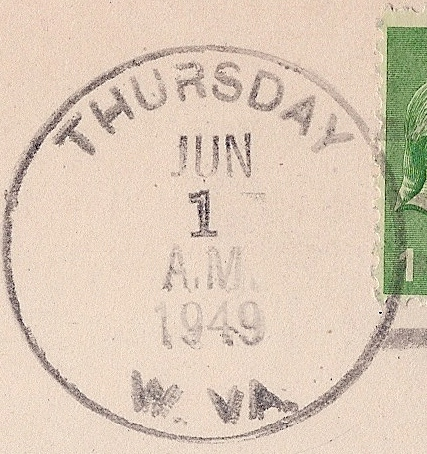
Thursday postmark
