= Little Chicago Prospect =

Oil and natural gas deposits in the Northwest Territories, Canada

- Oil and natural gas deposit
- Location within Northwest Territories Location within Canada
- Coordinates: 67°12′00″N 130°15′08″W
- Country: Canada
- Province: Northwest Territories
- Postal code: X0E 1L0

The Little Chicago Prospect is an oil and natural gas deposit on the Mackenzie River in the Sahtu Region of the Northwest Territories, Canada. For census purposes Statistics Canada shows it being located in the unorganized part of Region 2, Northwest Territories, and as of the 2021 census, its population was 0, unchanged from 2016.

The closest populated community is Fort Good Hope, about 127 km (79 mi) to the southeast, and it is situated 917 km (570 mi) northwest of Yellowknife, the capital of Northwest Territories, and 3,957 km (2,459 mi) away from Ottawa, the capital of Canada.

== Petroleum resources ==
In 2007, Kodiak Energy completed a survey of the petroleum resources along the Mackenzie River in the Little Chicago area and concluded that there could be up to 1 billion barrels of oil and up to 600 billion cubic feet of natural gas. The project was a part of the planned Mackenzie Valley Pipeline that was scrapped in 2017.

== See also ==
- Norman Wells
- Norman Wells Proven Area Agreement
