= Raven Rock, West Virginia =

Raven Rock
- Unincorporated community
- Location within the state of West Virginia Raven Rock (the United States)
- Coordinates: 39°26′22″N 81°9′2″W
- Country: United States
- State: West Virginia
- County: Pleasants
- Elevation: 633 ft (193 m)
- Time zone: UTC-5 (Eastern (EST))
  - Summer (DST): UTC-4 (EDT)
- GNIS ID: 1552589

Raven Rock is an unincorporated community in Pleasants County, in the U.S. state of West Virginia.

== History ==
A post office called Raven Rock was established in 1878, and remained in operation until 1968. The community took its name from a raven's nest perched high above the original town site.
