= Mechanicsville, Rockingham County, Virginia =

Mechanicsville, Virginia
- Unincorporated community
- Location within Virginia Location within the United States
- Coordinates: 38°40′04″N 78°47′16″W
- Country: United States
- State: Virginia
- County: Rockingham
- Elevation: 1,181 ft (360 m)
- Time zone: UTC-5 (Eastern (EST))
  - Summer (DST): UTC-4 (EDT)
- Area code: 540
- GNIS feature ID: 1499725

Mechanicsville is an unincorporated community in Rockingham County, Virginia, United States. Mechanicsville is 2 miles (3.2 km) north-northwest of Timberville.
