= Little Chicago, Wisconsin =

Unincorporated community in Wisconsin, United States

- community
- Location within Wisconsin Location within the United States
- Coordinates: 45.04722°N 89.84417°W
- Country: U.S.A.
- state: Wisconsin
- ZIP code: 54448

Little Chicago is an unincorporated residential and agricultural community on Marathon County Highway A in located along the border of the towns of Hamburg and Berlin, in Marathon County, Wisconsin, United States.

== History ==
The community was originally named Ziegler. In 1898, Ziegler had 60 people, a planing mill and a saw mill, one cheese factory; one hardware and one shoe store, and a Lutheran church. The United States Post Office delivered mail three times a week. In 1909, Ziegler had a post office.

The community reportedly got the name Little Chicago during the Prohibition era in the early 20th century, when a local tavern was dispensing illegal alcoholic beverages.

== Notable people ==
- Robert Plisch, Wisconsin state legislator and farmer, lived in Ziegler.

== Media ==
Little Chicago was the setting of Adam Rapp's novel Little Chicago.
