= Harold C. Whitehouse =

American architect

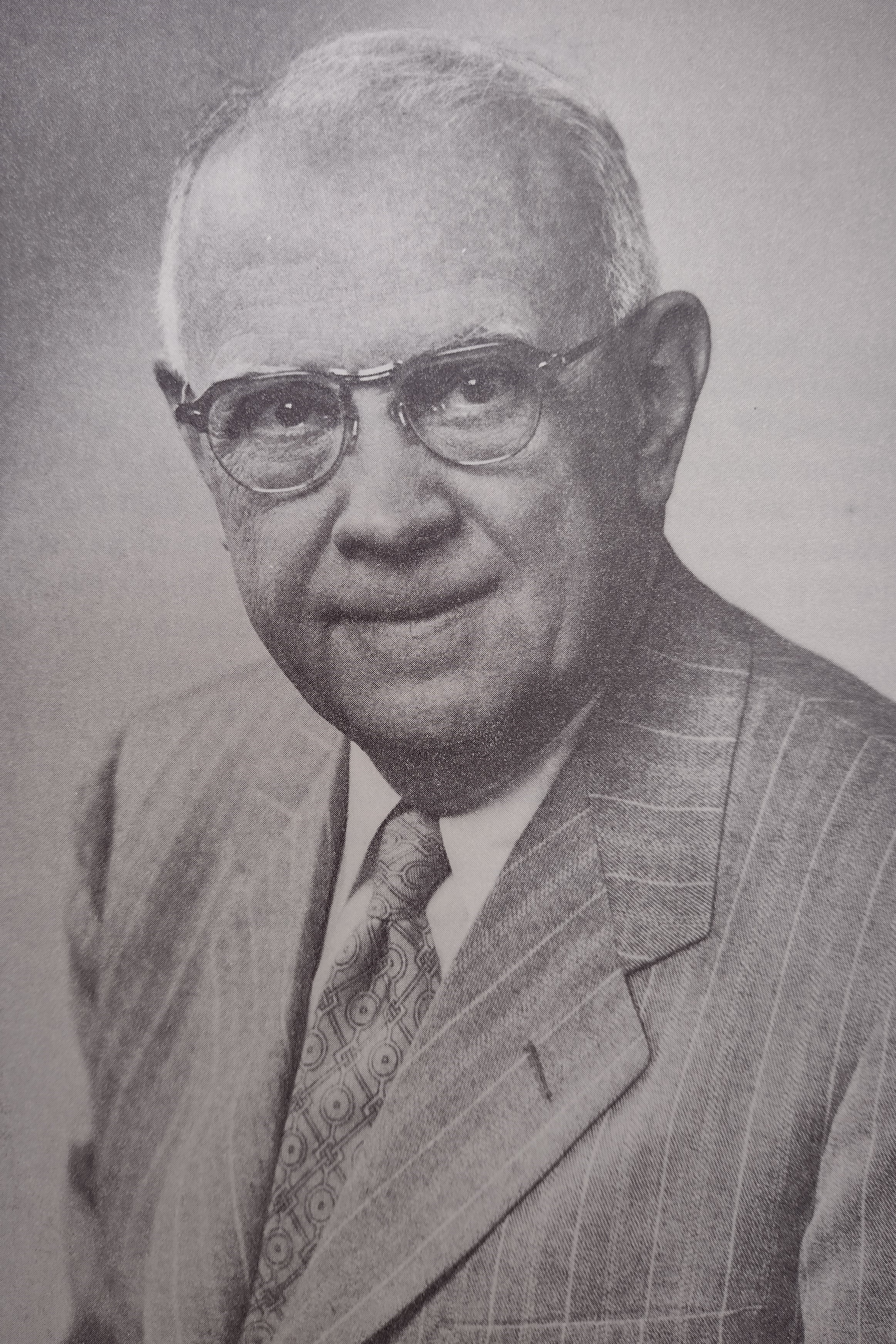
- Born: January 31, 1884
- Died: September 25, 1974 (aged 90)
- Occupation: Architect
- Spouse: Catherine Cox Weston (m. 1909; died 1964)

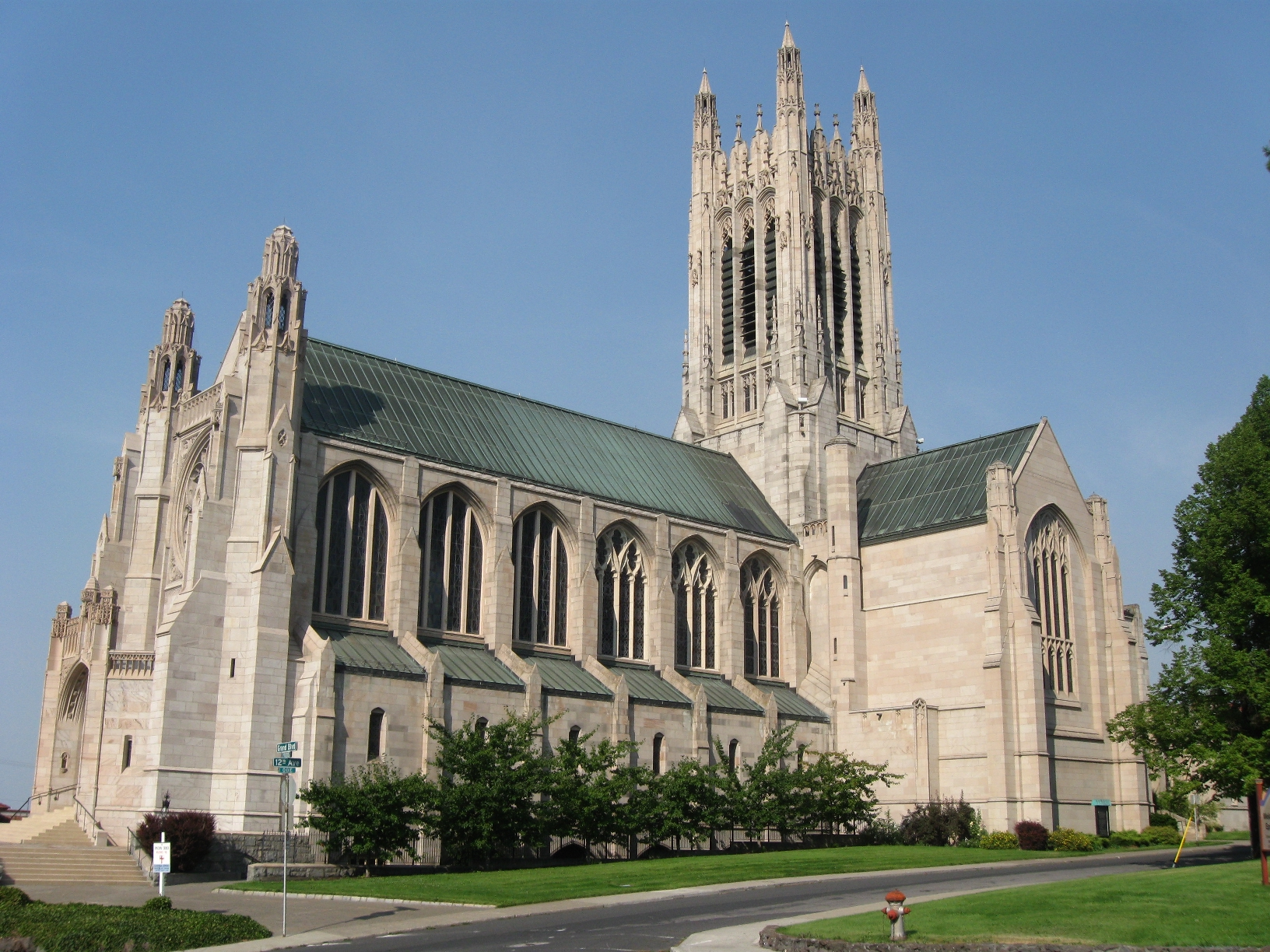
Cathedral of St. John the Evangelist, Spokane, Washington

Harold Clarence Whitehouse (January 31, 1884 - September 25, 1974) was an American architect based in Spokane, Washington.

A native of Massachusetts, Whitehouse moved to Spokane in 1906. He worked for a time in the office of John K. Dow and then formed a partnership with George Keith. He then left Spokane to study architecture at Cornell University. He graduated from Cornell in 1913. With fellow Cornell architecture graduate Ernest V. Price, he formed a partnership, the firm Whitehouse & Price, in 1913. He was elected to the American Institute of Architects College of Fellows in 1959 and won the Allied Art Award in 1961.

Whitehouse was married to Catherine Cox Weston from 1909 to her death in 1964, and later to Ruth W. Thompson until his death.

Works of Whitehouse or the firm (with attribution) include:

- Benewah Milk Bottle, S. 321 Cedar Spokane, WA (Whitehouse & Price), NRHP-listed
- Bradsmore Building, Priest River, Idaho (Whitehouse & Price), Part of NRHP-listed historic district.
- Cathedral of St. John the Evangelist, Spokane, Washington
- Chamber of Commerce Building, 9 S. Washington St., Spokane, WA.
- Christ Episcopal Church, 210 Fifth St. SW. Puyallup, WA (Whitehouse, Harold C.), NRHP-listed
- Cordova Theater, 135 N. Grand Ave. Pullman, WA (Whitehouse & Price), NRHP-listed
- Culmstock Arms Apartments.
- Dover Church, Washington between Third and Fourth Dover, ID (Whitehouse & Price), NRHP-listed
- Eastern State Hospital.
- Farragut Naval Training Station (650 buildings), Lake Pend Oreille, Bayview, Idaho.
- John A. Finch Memorial Nurses Home, N. 852 Summit Blvd. Spokane, WA (Whitehouse & Price), NRHP-listed
- Hutton Settlement (a complex of neo-Tudor cottages), 9907 Wellesley Spokane, WA (Whitehouse, Harold C.), NRHP-listed
- Lincoln Building, corner of Lincoln and Riverside, Spokane, WA.
- Masonic Temple, Deer Lodge, Montana (Whitehouse & Price), part of NRHP-listed historic district.
- One or more works in Millwood Historic District, roughly bounded by Argonne and Sargent Rds., and by Euclid and Liberty Aves. Millwood, WA (Whitehouse, Harold), NRHP-listed

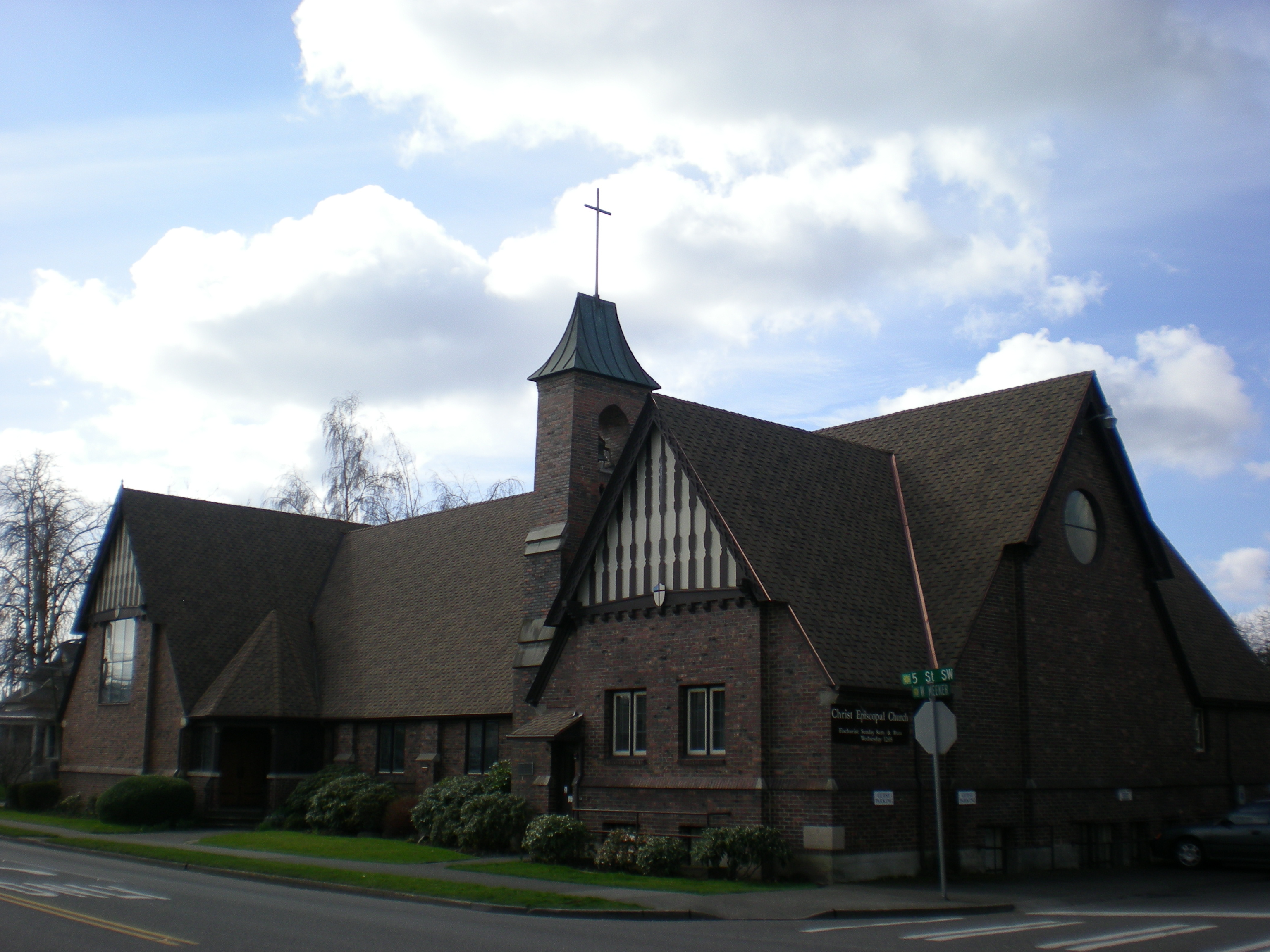
Christ Episcopal Church, Puyallup, Washington

- Mineral County Courthouse, Superior, Montana (Whitehouse & Price)
- Rosebush House, 3318 N. Marguerite Rd. Millwood, WA (Whitehouse, Harold), NRHP-listed
- Sandpoint High School, 102 S. Euclid Ave. Sandpoint, ID (Whitehouse & Price), NRHP-listed
- St. Peter's Cathedral, Helena, Montana.
- St. Thomas Church, Medina, Washington
- University of Washington Music Building.
- Washington State University Chemistry Building.
- West Valley High School, N. 2805 Argonne Rd. Millwood, WA (Whitehouse & Price), NRHP-listed

On September 25, 1974, Whitehouse died at age 90 in a Spokane convalescent center. Whitehouse's papers, including original drawings, are housed at the Eastern Washington State Historical Society and the University of Oregon Libraries Special Collections and University Archives.

== See also ==
- Morris H. Whitehouse and Whitehouse & Fouilhoux, architects of Oregon
