= Hutton Settlement District =

Historic district in Washington, United States

- Hutton Settlement
- U.S. National Register of Historic Places
- U.S. Historic district
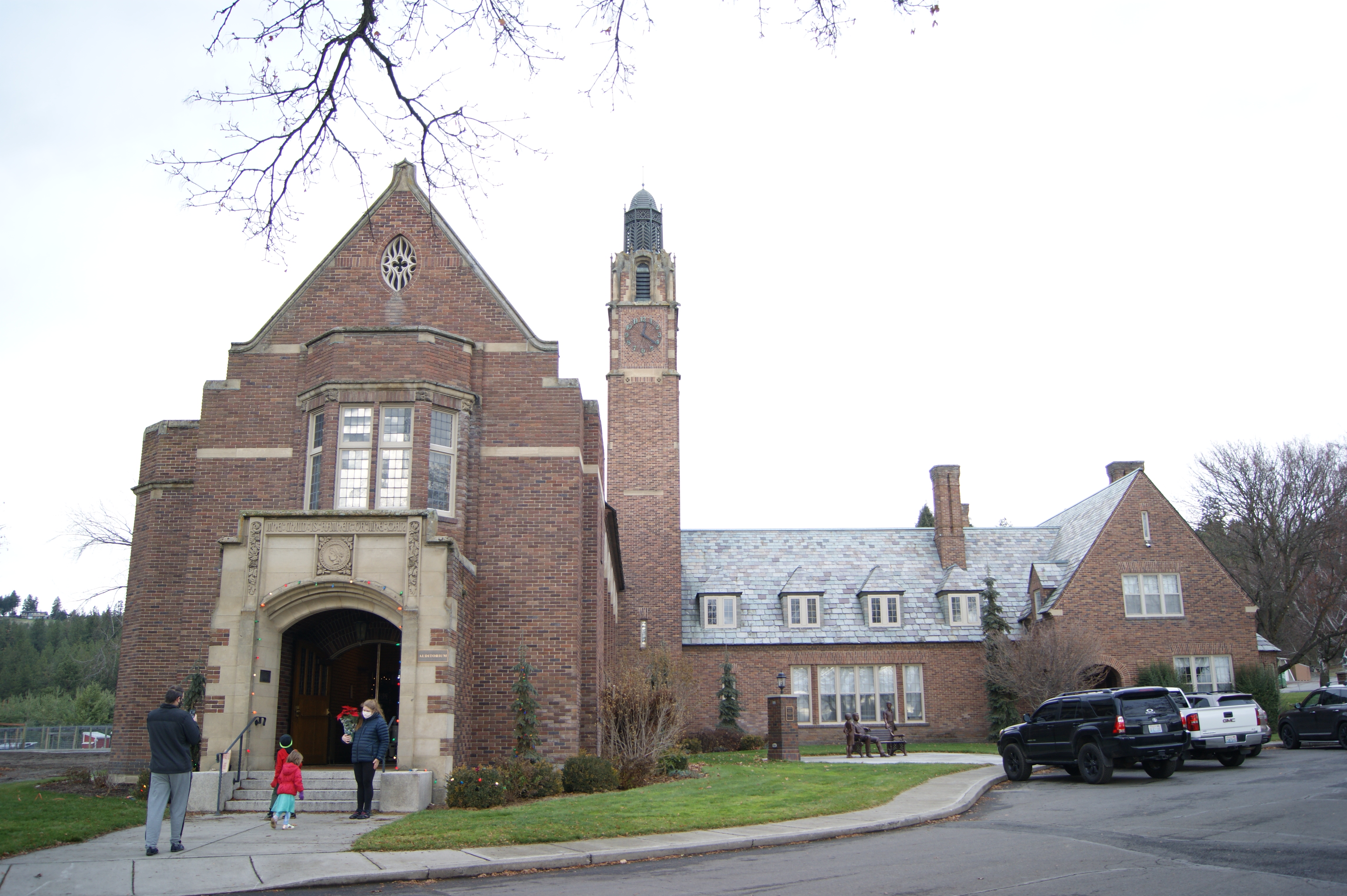

- Location within Washington (state)
- Nearest city: Spokane, Washington
- Coordinates: 47.7012°N 117.26611°W
- Area: 15 acres (6.1 ha)
- Built: 1917
- Architect: Harold C. Whitehouse., Ernest V. Price
- Architectural style: Tudor Revival, Jacobethan Revival
- NRHP reference No.: 76001919
- Added to NRHP: January 1, 1976; July 22, 1994

Hutton Settlement District is a historic district near Spokane, Washington. It was first listed on the NRHP in 1976 as Hutton Settlement. It had 15 acres (6.1 ha) with 12 contributing buildings and four contributing structures. It was expanded by 304 acres and renamed in 1994.

== History ==
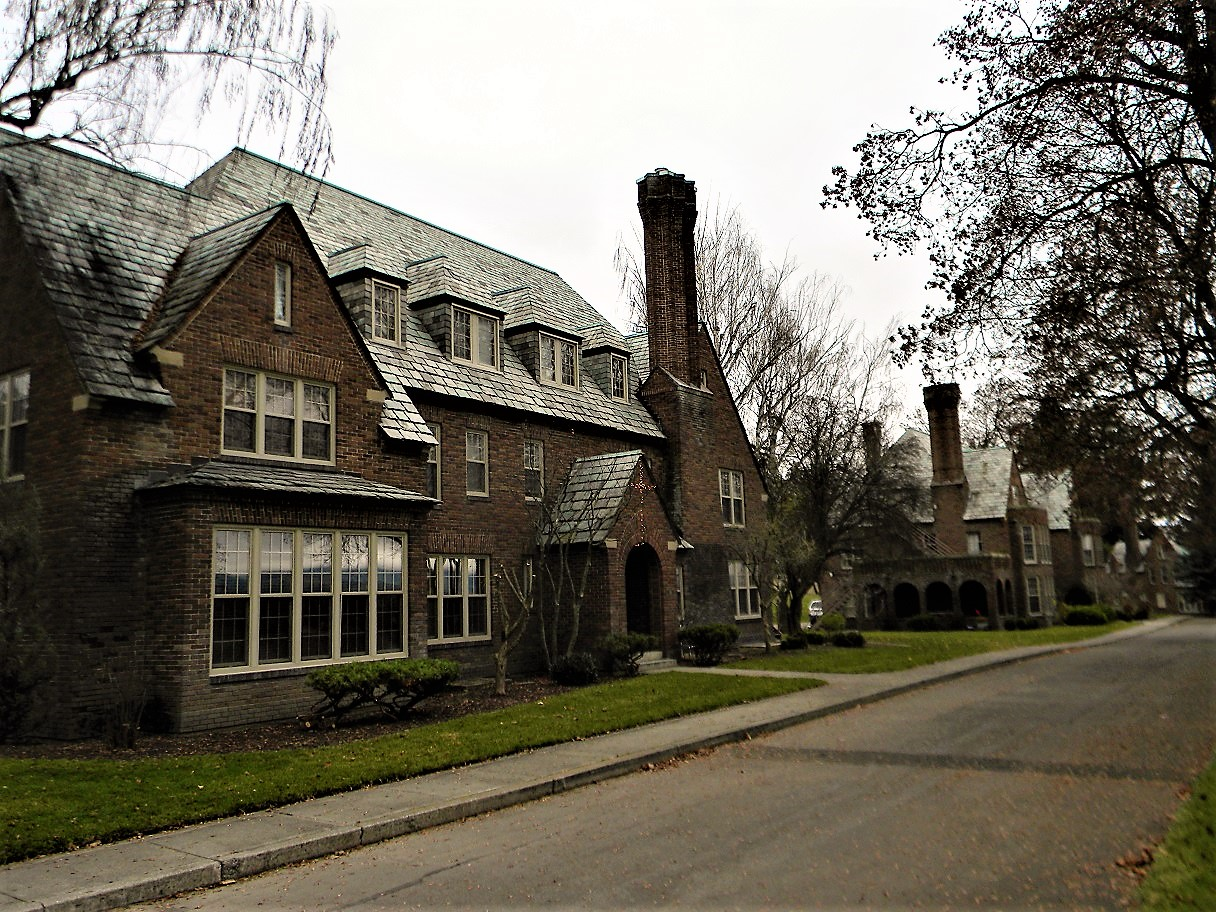
Building on the campus

The Hutton Settlement is an orphanage institution founded and endowed by mining magnate Levi W. Hutton in 1919. Following much research and a nationwide tour of orphanages for inspiration on the best orphanage design and organizational structure, a settlement on a 111-acre (45 ha) plot was designed to function as a working farm with an administration building and four “cottages” on the campus. As an orphan himself, “Daddy Hutton” as he became known, took a great interest in all aspects of the Settlement and was very involved in the planning, building, administration, and operation of the facilities until his death in 1928.

== See also ==
- Morning Star Boys' Ranch
