= Millwood Historic District =

Historic district in Washington, United States

- U.S. National Register of Historic Places
- U.S. Historic district
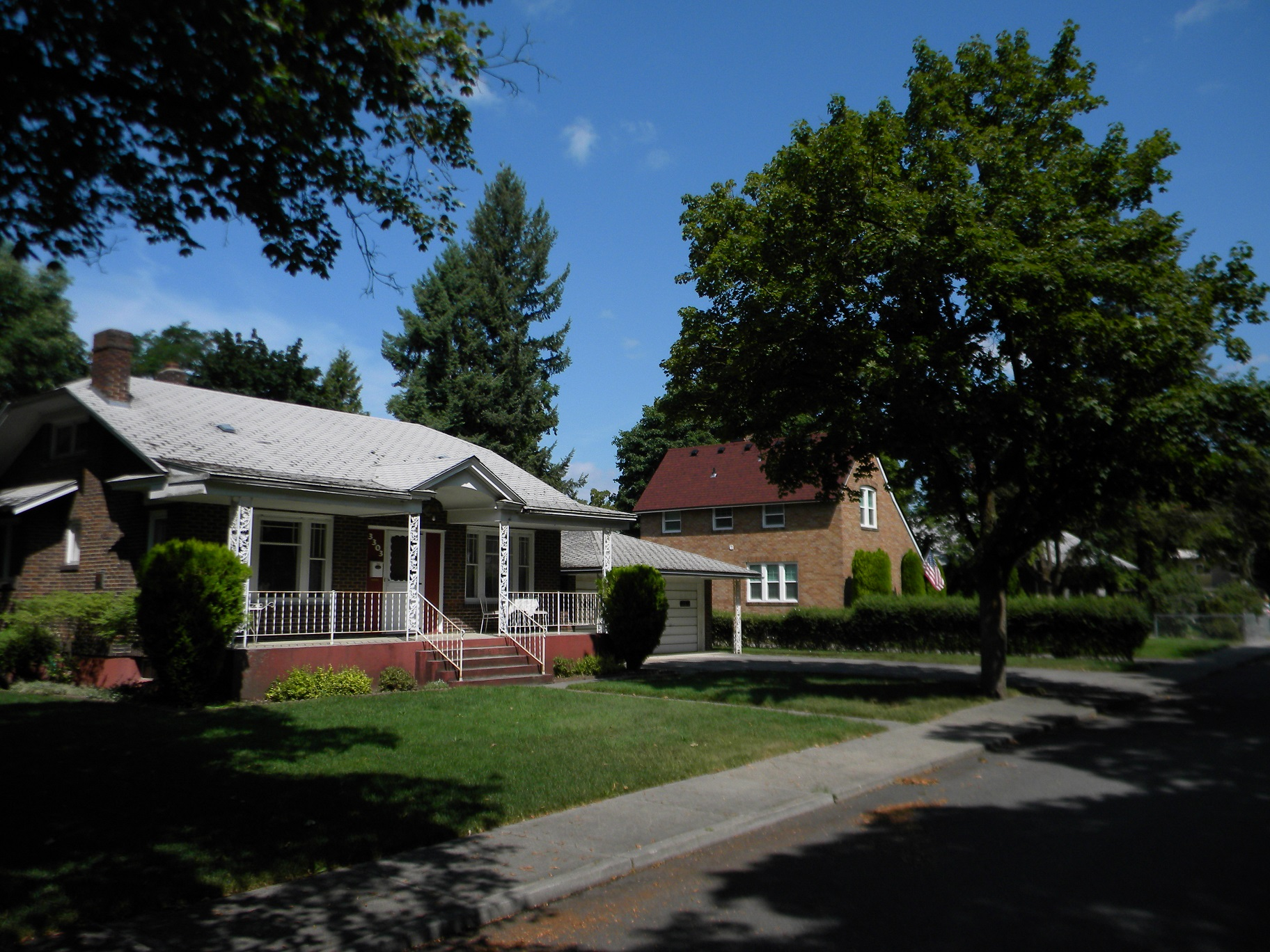

- Location within Washington (state)
- Location: Roughly bounded by Argonne and Sargent Rds., and by Euclid and Liberty Aves., Millwood, Washington
- Coordinates: 47.6869°N 117.28538°W
- Area: 20 acres (8.1 ha)
- Built: 1910
- Architect: Whitehouse, Harold
- Architectural style: Bungalow/Craftsman, Late 19th and 20th Century Revivals, et al.
- NRHP reference No.: 01000064
- Added to NRHP: February 2, 2001

The Millwood Historic District in Millwood, Washington is a 20-acre (8.1 ha) historic district that was listed on the National Register of Historic Places in 2001. The listing included 69 contributing buildings and one other contributing site. It includes work by architect Harold Whitehouse.

== Setting ==
Millwood is a suburb of Spokane located along the Spokane River about a mile east of the Spokane city limits and surrounded on three sides by the City of Spokane Valley. It is a mostly flat area to the south of the Spokane River on the valley floor.

The Millwood Historic District occupies roughly eight square blocks in the northwest quadrant of Millwood. It is bounded by Euclid Avenue on the south, Argonne Road on the east and stretches to include the west side of Sargent Road on the west and the north side of Liberty Avenue on the north. A railroad track runs immediately south of Euclid Avenue.

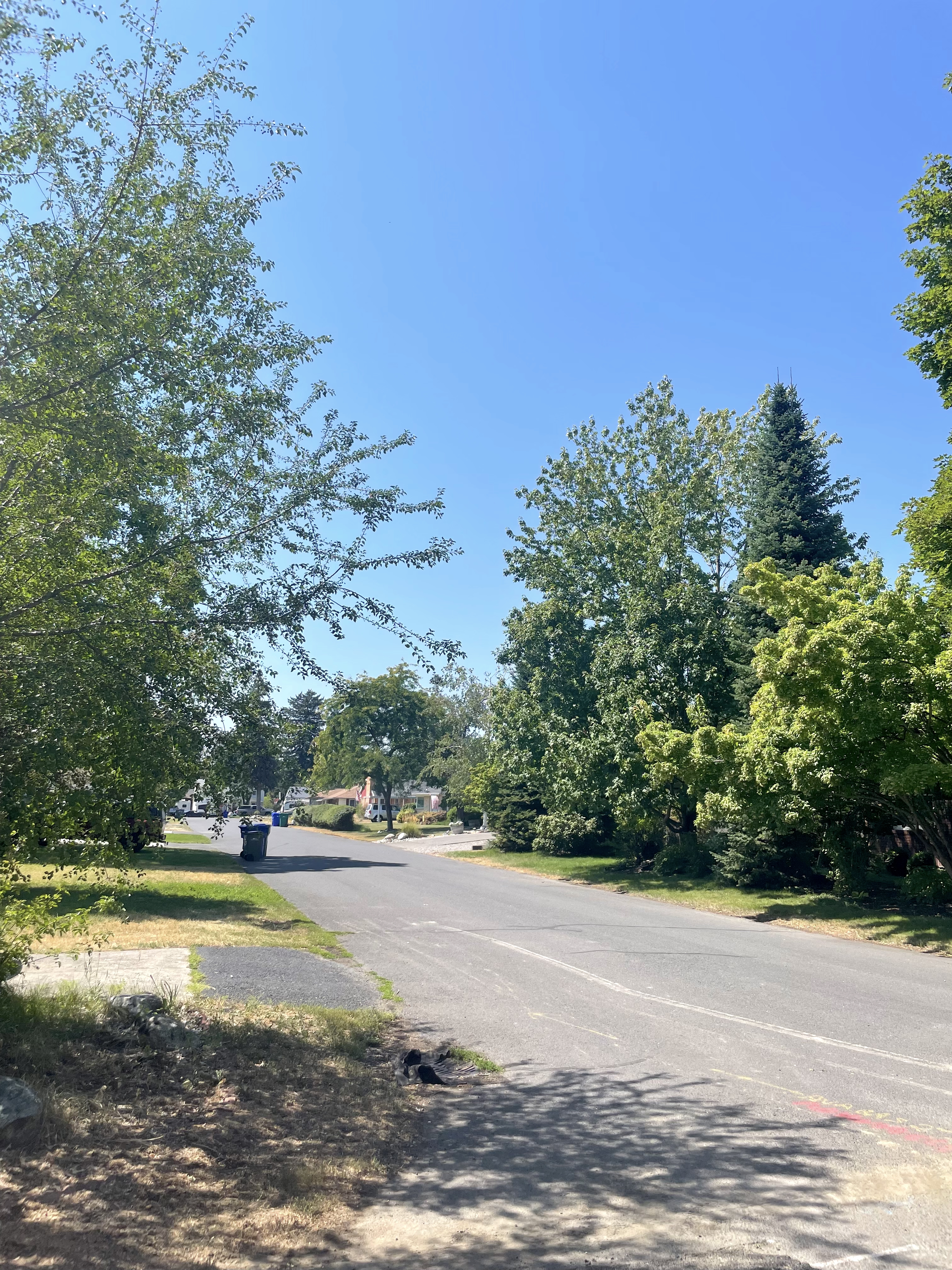
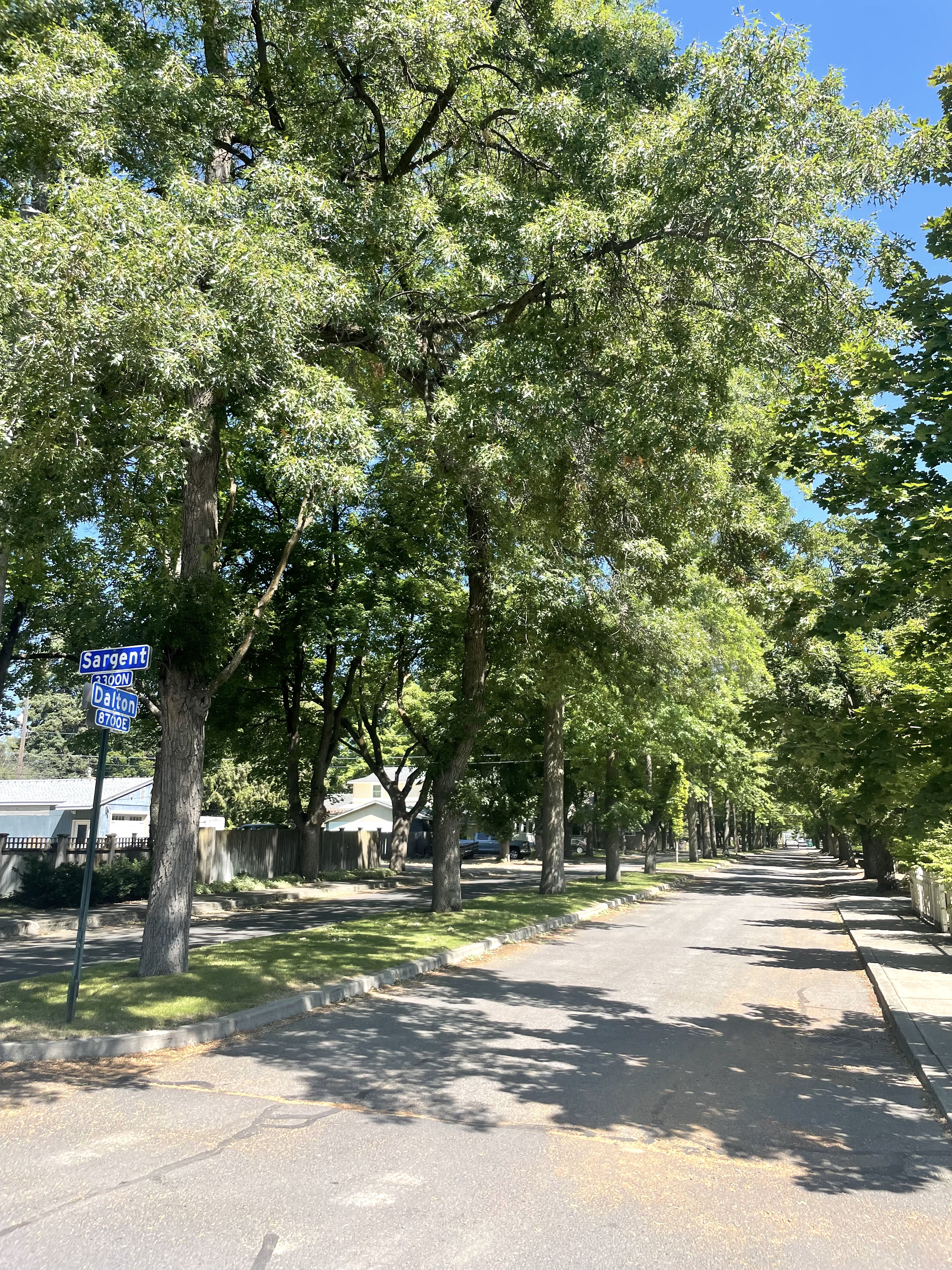
Looking out of (left) and into (right) the Millwood Historic District at Dalton Ave. and Sargent Rd.

It was the first area developed in Millwood, with the bulk of the development coming between the 1920s and 1940s. There is a distinct difference in the architecture and tree canopy between the historic district and the rest of the residential and commercial areas of Millwood which were developed more recently. The boundary between the historic district and the rest of the city is obvious to see in most places. Within the district, the streets are tree-lined and built with sidewalks. Outside the district, street trees are lacking and sidewalks mostly non-existent.

Argonne Road is the main street through Millwood, connecting the city with the rest of the Spokane area via highways to the south. As the main street, it is home to the commercial section of the historic district, which runs along the west side of Argonne and wraps around for the first block of Euclid Avenue. The rest of the district is single-family residential in nature.

== History ==
=== Early history ===
Prior to European settlement, the area that is now the historic district was homeland to the Spokane people. A winter camp for the upper Spokane was recorded in the area.

European settlement in the Millwood area began with Antoine Plante, who founded a ferry across the river in 1856 about two miles upstream. M.F. Warren became the first settler to homestead within the borders of the historic district in 1883. Development in the area was spurred on in 1903 when an electric interurban railway connecting Spokane to Coeur d'Alene was routed through Millwood. The community became known as Woodard Junction after the family that provided land for the railway and station. What became known as Argonne Road was established through the area in 1908 to connect the Spokane Valley community of Dishman, Washington, on the south side of the valley opposite Millwood, north to the Spokane River at Millwood.

=== Foundational years ===
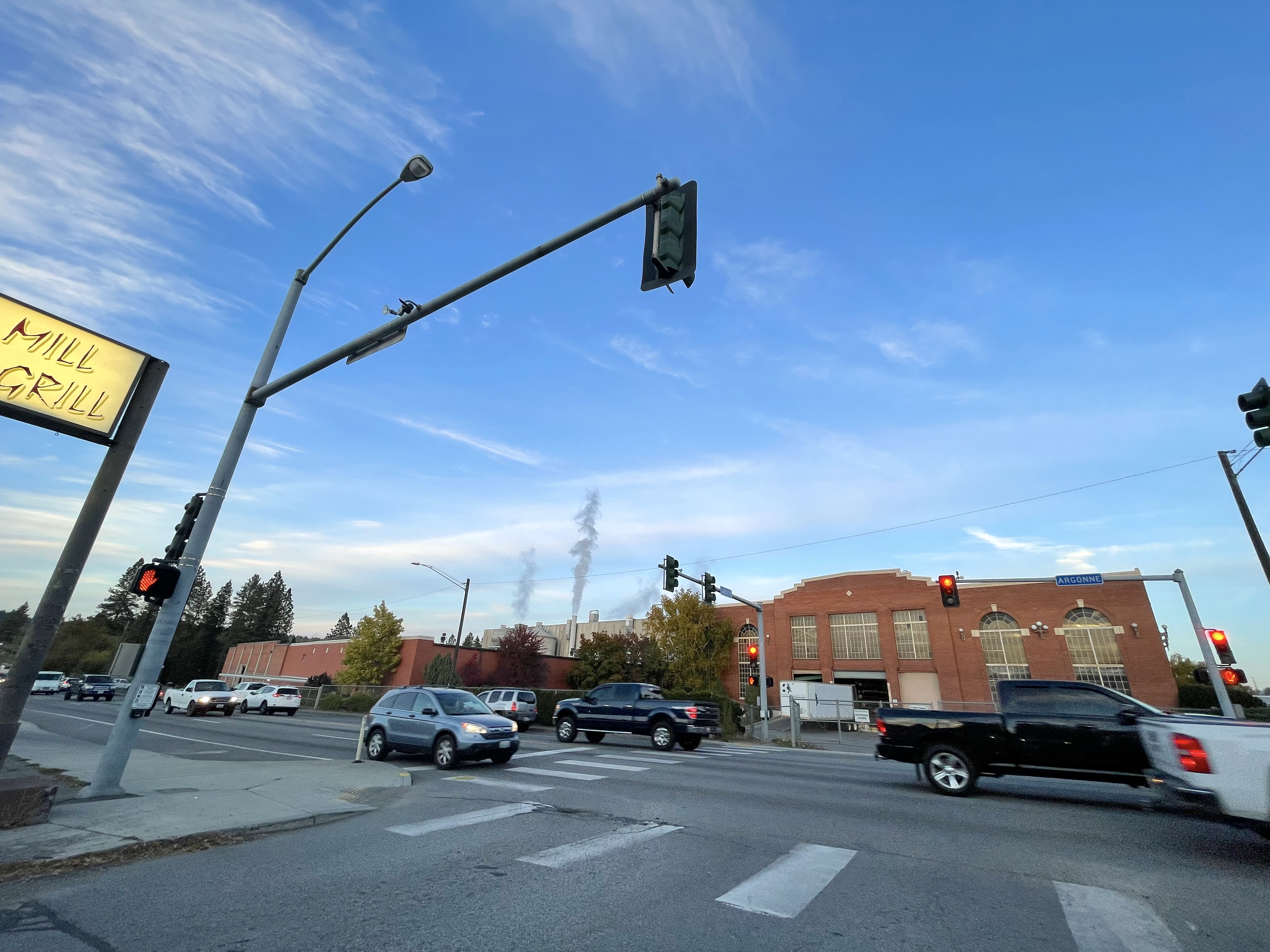
Inland Empire Paper Company

During the early 1900s, as the city of Spokane saw its population swell, the Spokane Valley became a regional center for farming — nearby communities like Greenacres and Otis Orchards reflect that history in their names. Millwood grew along a similar track until 1910 when the Inland Empire Paper Company began work on a paper mill on the east side of Argonne Road. This construction and industrial development in the Millwood area changed the nature of the community from a rural, agricultural area into a more settled town.

Soon after construction of the mill, which expanded numerous times over the following years, developers and financiers behind the new mill worked to change the community's name from Woodard Station to something that would advertise the presence of the mill and its economic impact on the area. With the approval of the Woodard family, the name was changed to Millwood.

As workers flocked to the area, many from paper mills in the Midwest, other businesses were established in the area to serve the new population. A store, barbershop, restaurant and hotel had been established by 1911, the year the mill opened for business.

Despite the overwhelming presence of the Inland Empire Paper Company in the town's economy, connectivity with other towns around the Spokane Valley prevented Millwood from becoming a company town. A steel bridge was built across the river in 1909. Nearby subdivisions like Orchard Avenue, between Millwood and Spokane, were closer to the commercial district in Millwood than to those in the much larger city of Spokane. Millwood's location meant that the town would serve more than just workers at the paper mill.

=== Boom years ===
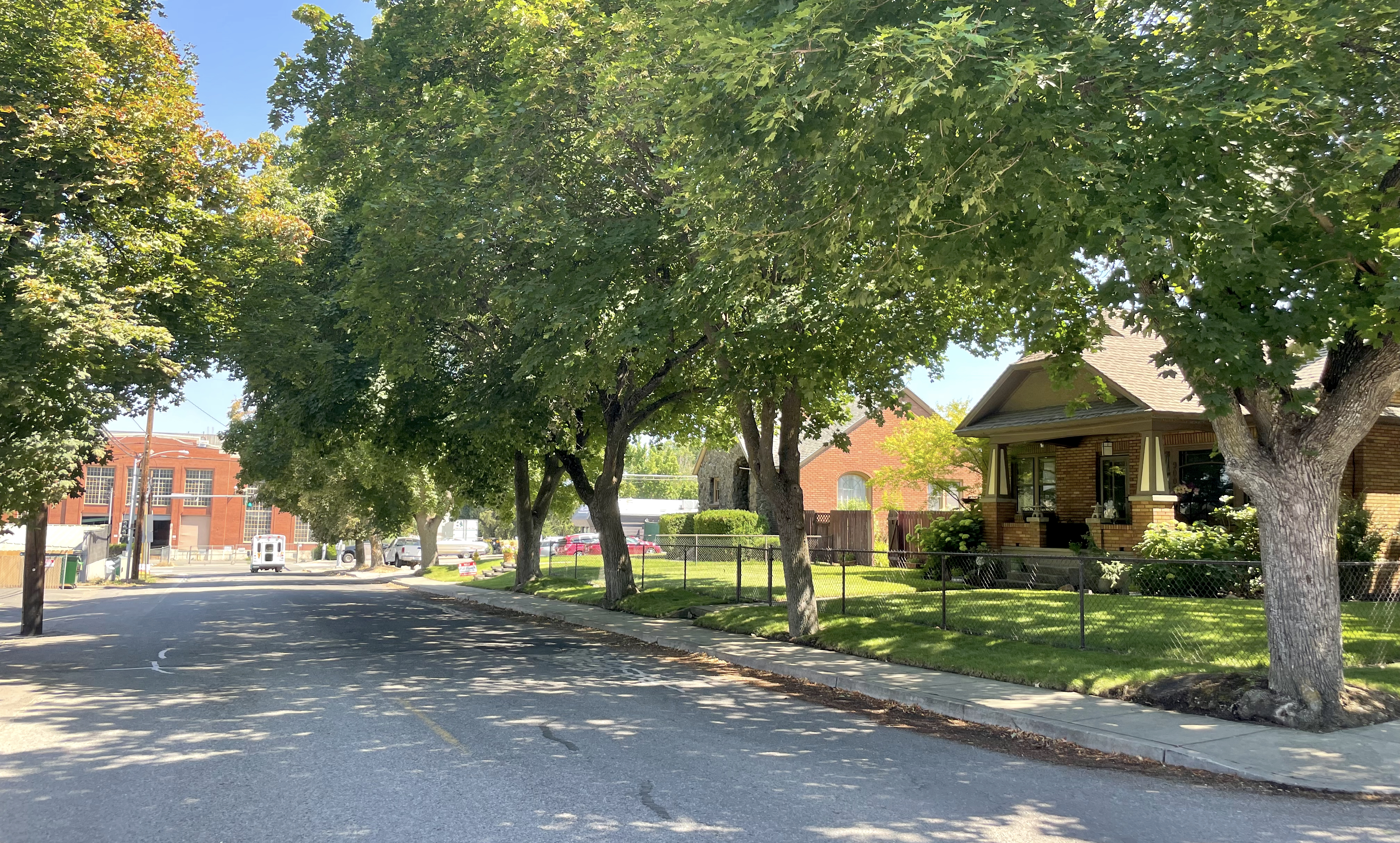
Homes in the district, with the paper mill visible in the background

With demand for housing outpacing supply as the mill continued to expand, the paper company started purchasing lots around its property in 1911. By the early 1920s, the company owned most of the lots in the townsite and in 1923 established a loan fund to help employees construct homes in Millwood. The company issued pattern books for home construction. The use of these pattern books would become one of the qualifying factors for the district to land on the NRHP some eight decades later. The push by the company to have employees build homes on the nearby land was inspired by the 1922 Better Homes in America movement.

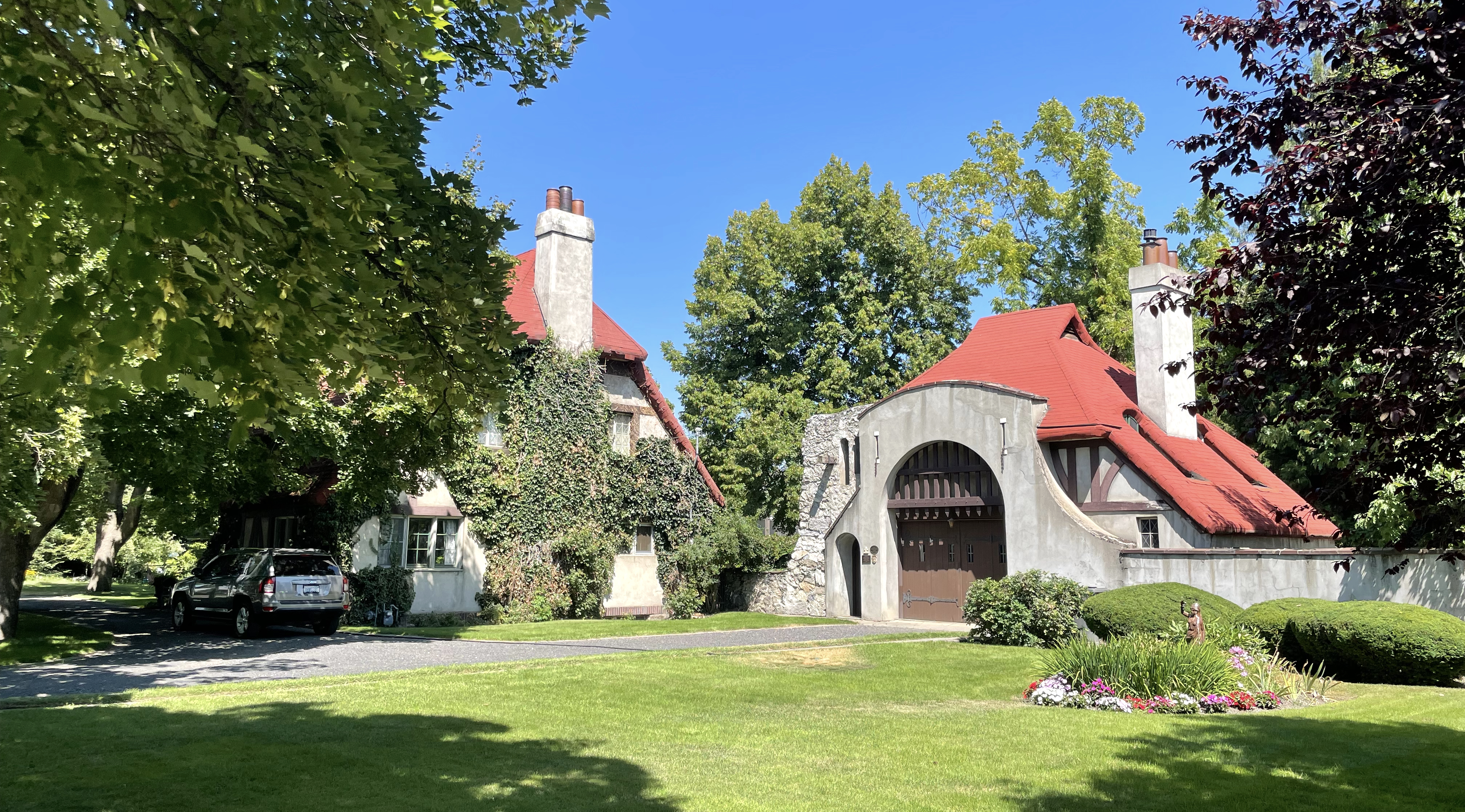
The Rosebush House

In 1923, residential development started to take off as the paper company built a rail line from the mill into what is now the historic district to bring a steam shovel to help facilitate construction. Nine homes were built in 1923, including the Rosebush House which was built for Waldo Rosebush who was the mill's general manager for much of the boom years. The direct replica of a Normandy cabin was listed individually on the NRHP in 2000. Additional waves of construction occurred in 1927 and 1928. On October 15, 1927, by a vote of 75 in favor to 5 against, the citizens of Millwood voted to incorporate into a fourth-class town.

Inland Empire Paper Company continued to expand throughout the 1910s and 1920s, and made a major expansion in 1931, but as the Great Depression dragged on that growth would ultimately come to a halt. In the 1930s the company needed to be reorganized in order to stay in business.

=== Later years ===
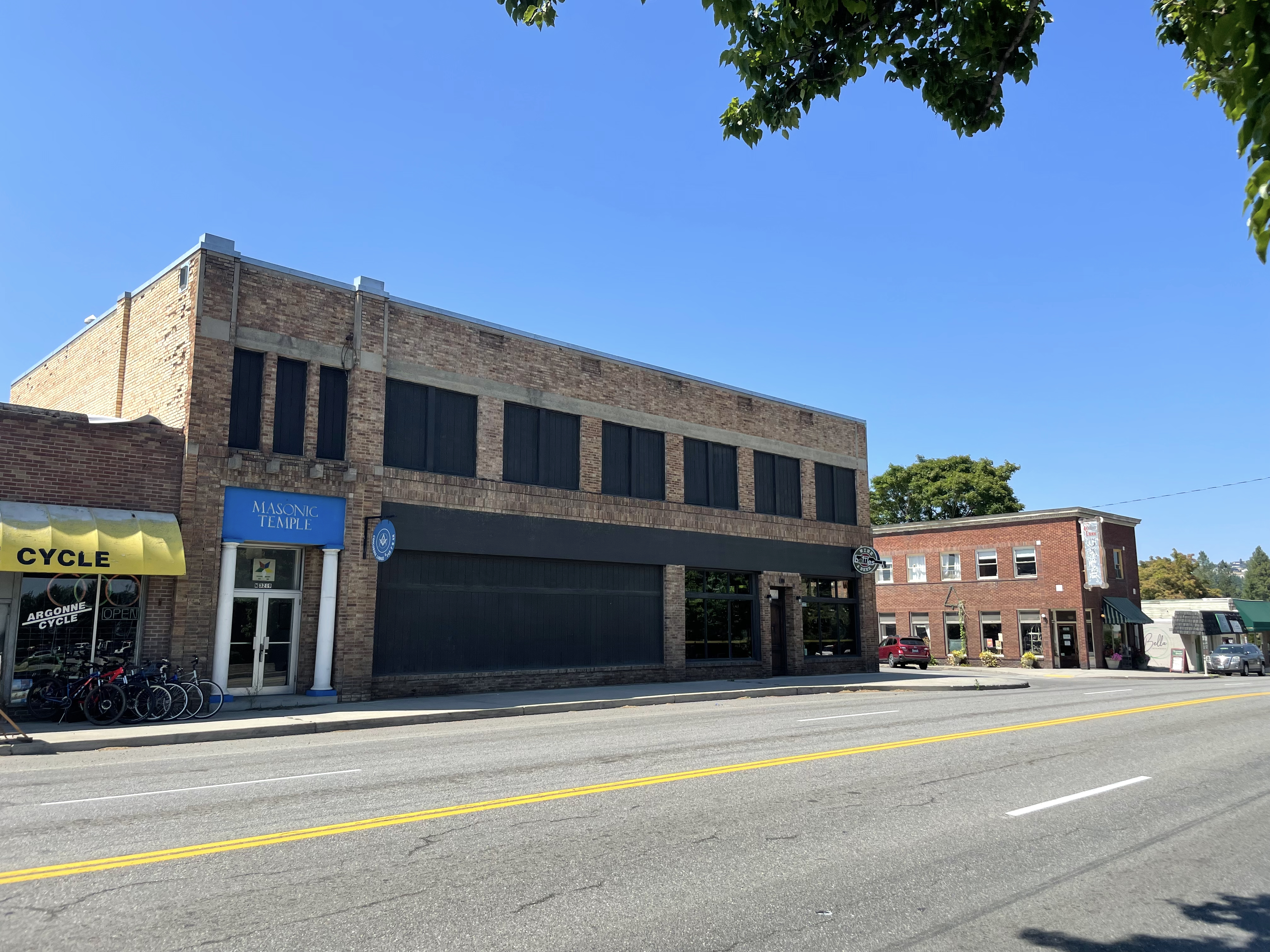
Commercial district on Argonne

Stagnation occurred during the Great Depression and into World War II, though a handful of homes and commercial buildings were constructed in the district in the 1930s and 1940s. From the early-1950s through the turn of the 21st century, no new buildings were constructed in the historic district. Construction did continue in Millwood outside of the district as well as in the surrounding communities of the Spokane Valley as suburbanization spread eastward from Spokane. A strip mall called Argonne Center was built in 1960, about six blocks south of the historic commercial district on Argonne, just outside of the Millwood City Limits on the other side of Trent Avenue. The strip mall pulled business and businesses away from the town's historic core. By the late 1970s, one-quarter of commercial spaces in the historic district were vacant.

Starting in the 1990s, businesses began returning to the historic center. Specialty shops of different varieties and a handful of cafes opened. Millwood was the only incorporated town in the Spokane Valley until the City of Spokane Valley incorporated, and nearly surrounded the town, in 2003.

== Gallery ==
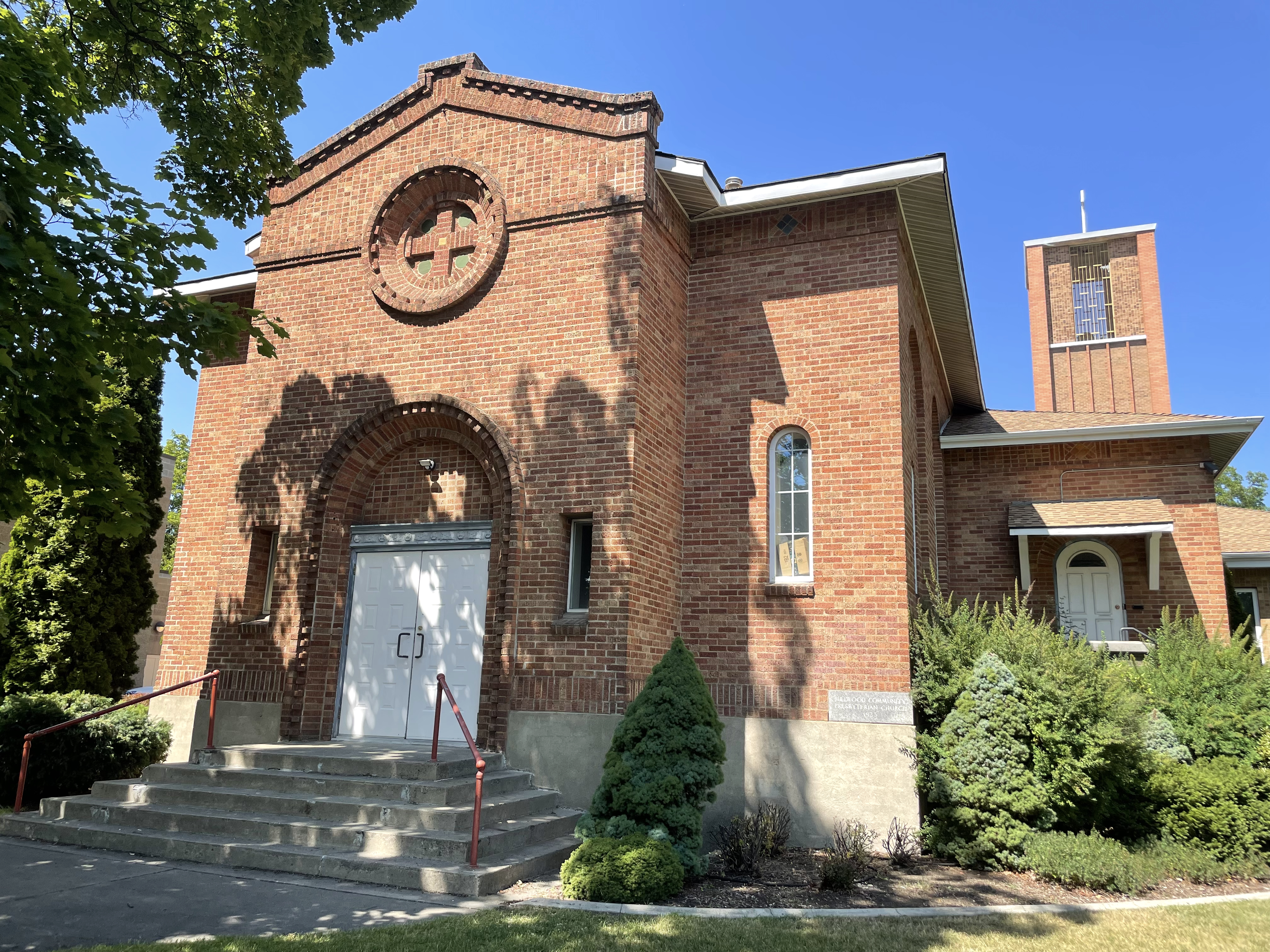
Presbyterian church, showing the original 1923 structure with later additions

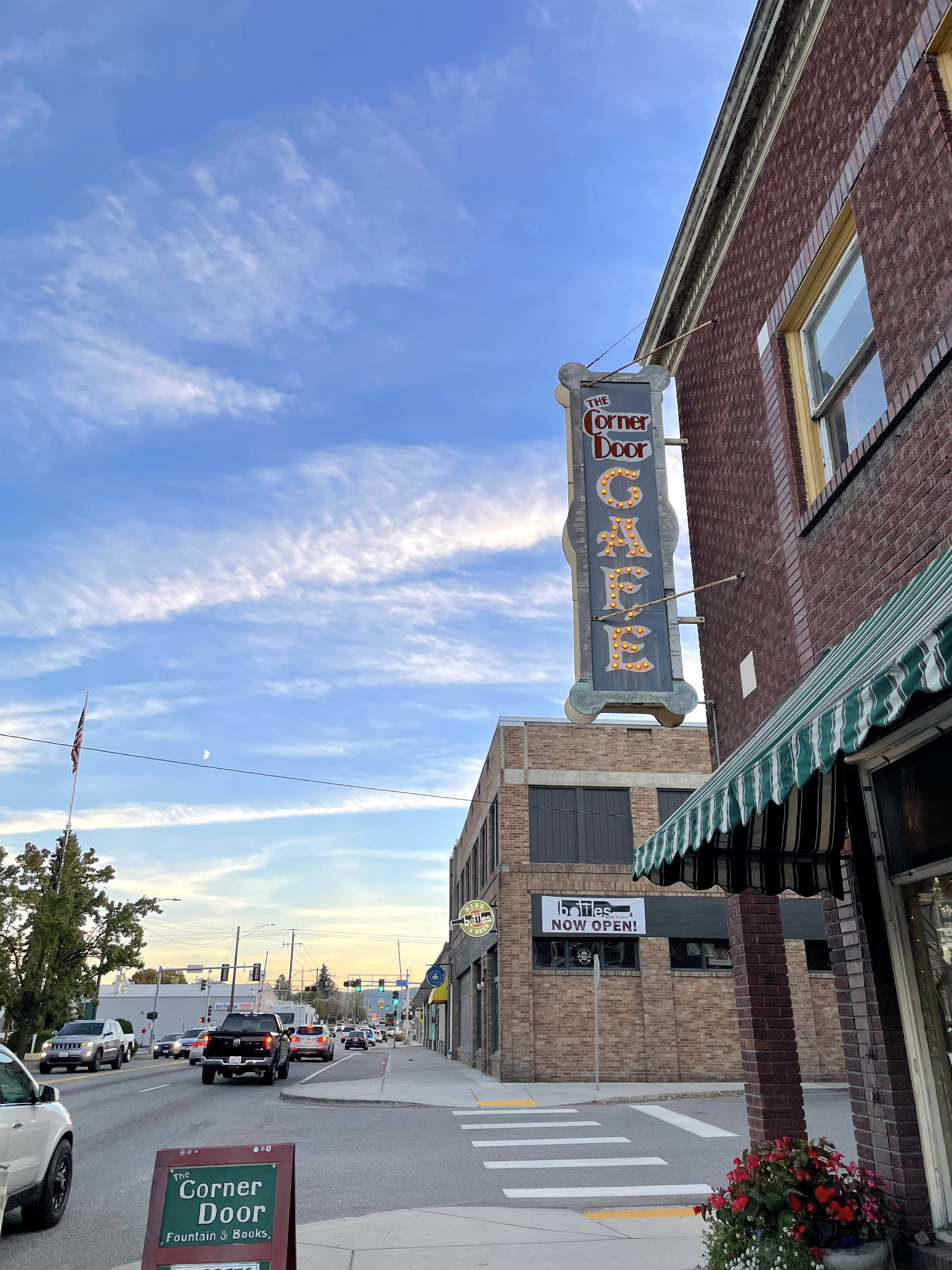
Commercial buildings at Argonne and Dalton

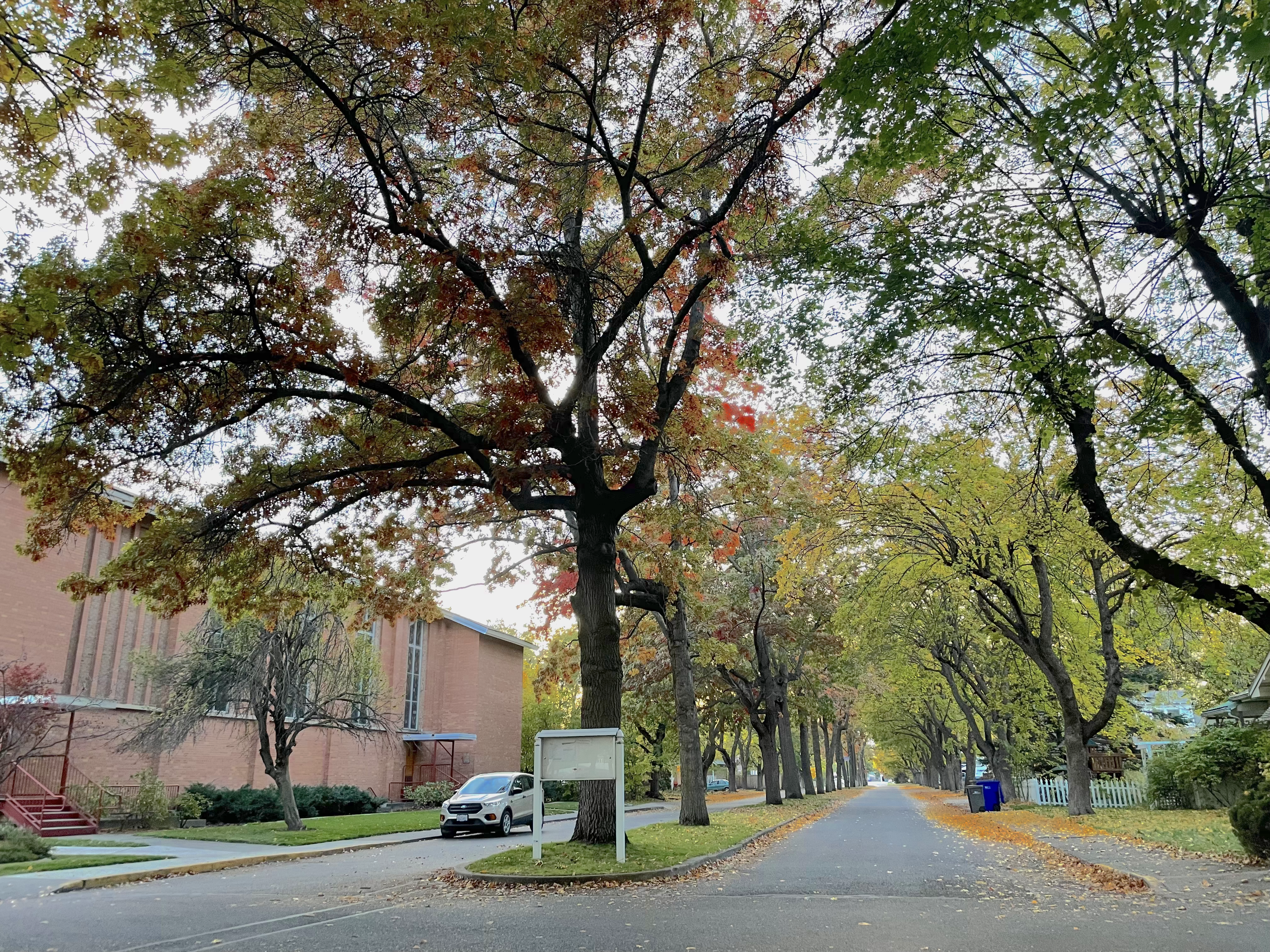
Dalton Avenue's tree-lined boulevard in autumn

== See also ==
- Millwood, Washington
- National Register of Historic Places listings in Spokane County, Washington
