= Robert Ferguson (physicist) =

Nuclear physicist (1932–2022)

Robert L. Ferguson
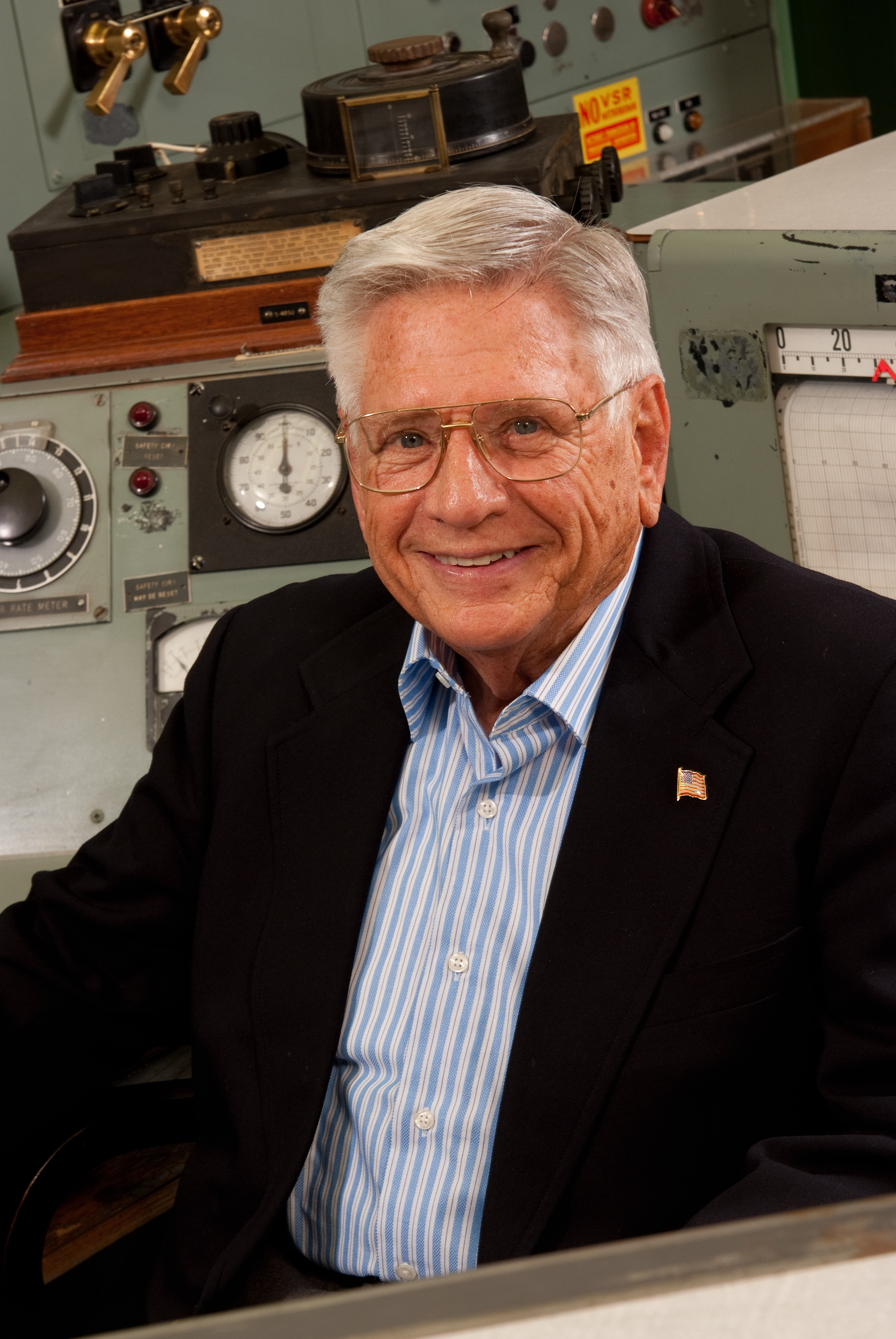
- Ferguson in 2012

1st Deputy Assistant Secretary of Nuclear Programs, U.S. Department of Energy
- In office 1978–1980

Personal details
- Born: October 26, 1932 Dover, Idaho
- Died: August 12, 2022 (aged 89) Idaho
- Spouse: Catherine Anne "Katie" Crosby (died 2018)
- Children: 2
- Education: Gonzaga University (BS)

Robert Louis (Bob) Ferguson (October 26, 1932 – August 12, 2022) was a nuclear-trained physicist and a 60-year veteran in the field of nuclear energy. He was best known for being appointed the first Deputy Assistant Secretary for Nuclear Energy Programs for the U.S. Department of Energy (DOE) by the first Energy Secretary, James Schlesinger, serving from 1978 to 1980 during President Jimmy Carter's administration.

Ferguson was also known for taking leadership of the Washington Public Power Supply System (WPPSS) in 1980 as the "no nonsense manager" during troubled times for the nuclear power industry.

Ferguson was one of three private citizens who successfully sued President Barack Obama and the Nuclear Regulatory Commission (NRC) for illegally shutting down the Yucca Mountain nuclear waste repository project.

Ferguson was the author of two books based on government mismanagement of nuclear waste and spent nuclear fuel. The Cost of Deceit & Delay: Obama and Reid's Scheme to Kill Yucca Mountain Wastes $Billions was published in 2012. Nuclear Waste in Your Backyard: Who's to Blame and How to Fix It was published in 2014.

== Early life, education, and career ==
Ferguson was born in Dover, Idaho, and educated by the Jesuits at Gonzaga High School (1950) and Gonzaga University in Spokane, Washington, where he graduated in 1954 with a Bachelors’ of Science in physics. He married Catherine Anne "Katie" Crosby, the niece of Bing Crosby, in June 1956.

=== 1954–1957 – military service ===
Ferguson was commissioned as an officer after training with the Reserve Officers' Training Corps (ROTC). He attended Ordnance Guided Missile School at Redstone Arsenal in Huntsville, Alabama, and was then transferred to White Sands Proving Ground in 1956. He served as 1st Lieutenant in the U.S. Army Ordnance Corps at White Sands, New Mexico, until 1957. His career in the Army included temporary duty at the Pentagon and in Australia during the testing of guided missiles.

=== 1957–1980 – Atomic Energy Commission/Energy Research & Development Administration/U.S. Department of Energy ===
General Electric at Hanford: Ferguson began his career in the nuclear field when he joined General Electric at the Hanford Site, known as the Hanford Works in 1957. He trained and worked as a reactor physicist and reactor operations supervisor at the historic B Reactor, the first full-scale nuclear reactor in the world. The B Reactor produced the plutonium used in the first nuclear detonation test at Alamogordo, New Mexico, and for “The Fat Man” atomic bomb, which was dropped on Nagasaki to end World War II.

Chicago Operations Office at Argonne: In 1961, Ferguson joined the AEC's Chicago Operations Office at Argonne National Laboratory (ANL) with the intention of turning his career toward peaceful uses of nuclear technology. He was sent to attend the historic Oak Ridge School of Reactor Technology (ORSORT), which was initiated by Alvin M. Weinberg, director of Oak Ridge National Laboratory, and Admiral Hyman G. Rickover, father of the nuclear navy, for an accelerated course in all aspects of nuclear reactor safety. On returning to Argonne, Ferguson participated in the design, construction, and operational safety review of the AEC's Second Round Commercial Reactor Demonstration Program, the Space Nuclear Program, and research reactors at ANL in Illinois, the National Reactor Testing Station (NRTS), now known as Idaho National Laboratory, and Atomics International's Santa Susana Field Laboratory in California.

Ferguson assumed project management responsibilities for reactor and high energy physics projects including the management structure for the construction of the National Accelerator Laboratory, renamed the Fermi National Accelerator Laboratory (Fermilab).

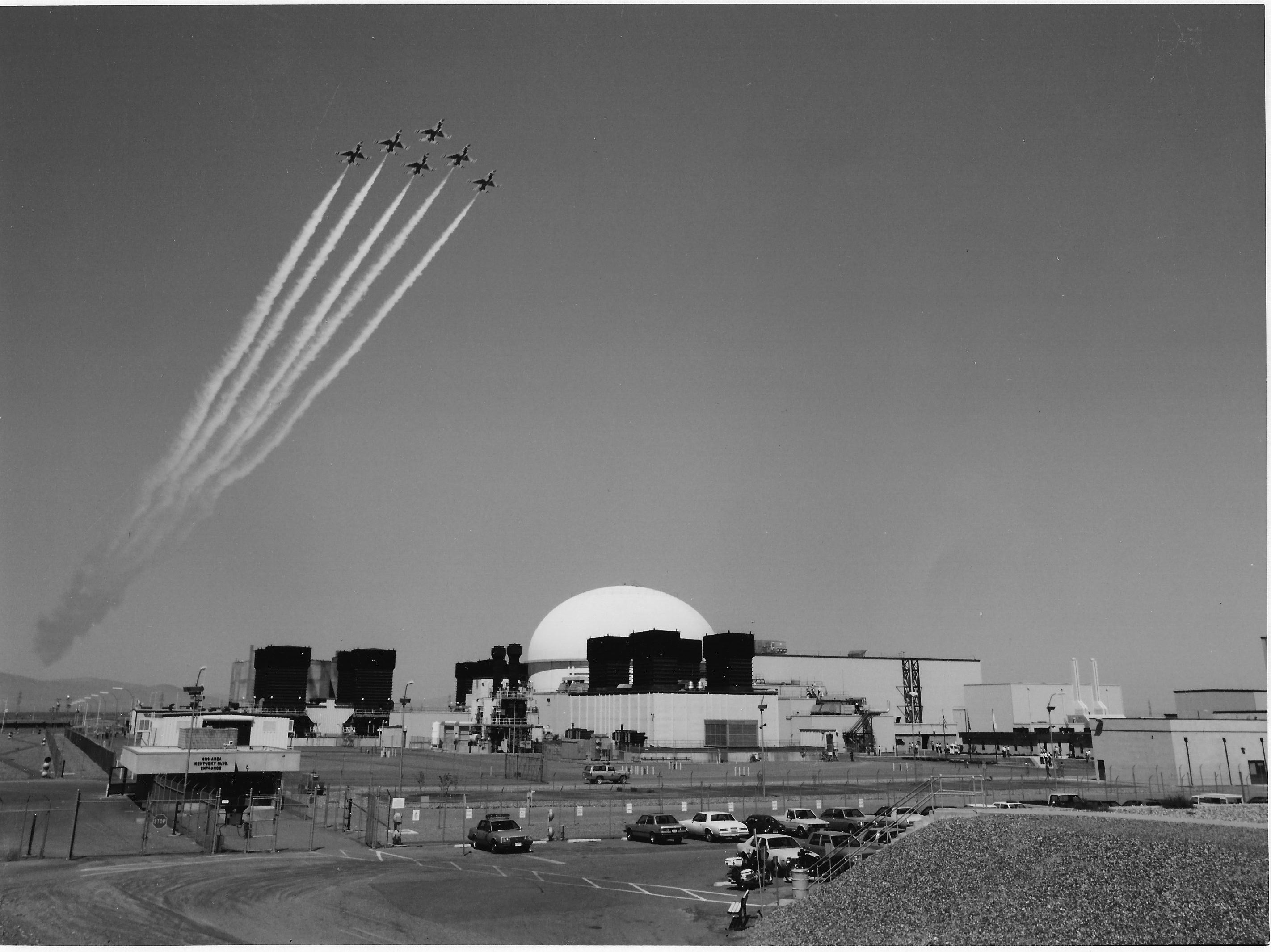
Fast Flux Test Facility on the Hanford Site in Richland, Washington, was completed in 1978 and began operation in 1980. Its purpose was to test advanced nuclear fuels, materials, components, nuclear power plant operations and maintenance protocols, and reactor safety designs for commercial fast breeder reactors. Photo source: U.S. Department of Energy.

The Fast Flux Test Facility at Hanford: In 1972, Ferguson joined the Richland Operations Office at Hanford in Washington State where he served as Director of Contracts and Assistant Manager for Projects. In 1973, he formed the Fast Flux Test Facility (FFTF) Project Office and assumed total responsibility for the Hanford Engineering Development Laboratory's breeder reactor program and construction of the FFTF experimental fast neutron reactor.

Deputy Assistant Secretary for Nuclear Programs: In 1978, Ferguson was appointed Deputy Assistant Secretary for Nuclear Energy by the first Secretary of Energy, James R. Schlesinger. During this eventful two-year period, Ferguson traveled extensively to manage and implement President Jimmy Carter's Nonproliferation Alternative Systems Assessment Program (NASAP) and the International Nuclear Fuel Cycle Study (INFCE), which was jointly operated with the International Atomic Energy Agency (IAEA), as well as bilateral technical exchanges with England, France, Italy, West Germany, Japan, and the Soviet Union regarding nuclear energy.

Ferguson spent much of his early time at DOE in technology exchange meetings with foreign countries explaining President Carter's non-proliferation policy, which stopped indefinitely the reprocessing of spent nuclear fuel out of concerns that it presented a serious threat of nuclear weapons proliferation. The U.S. had entered into multi-lateral and bi-lateral agreements with other nations for the exchange of fission energy technology following President Dwight D. Eisenhower’s Atoms for Peace Initiative in 1953.

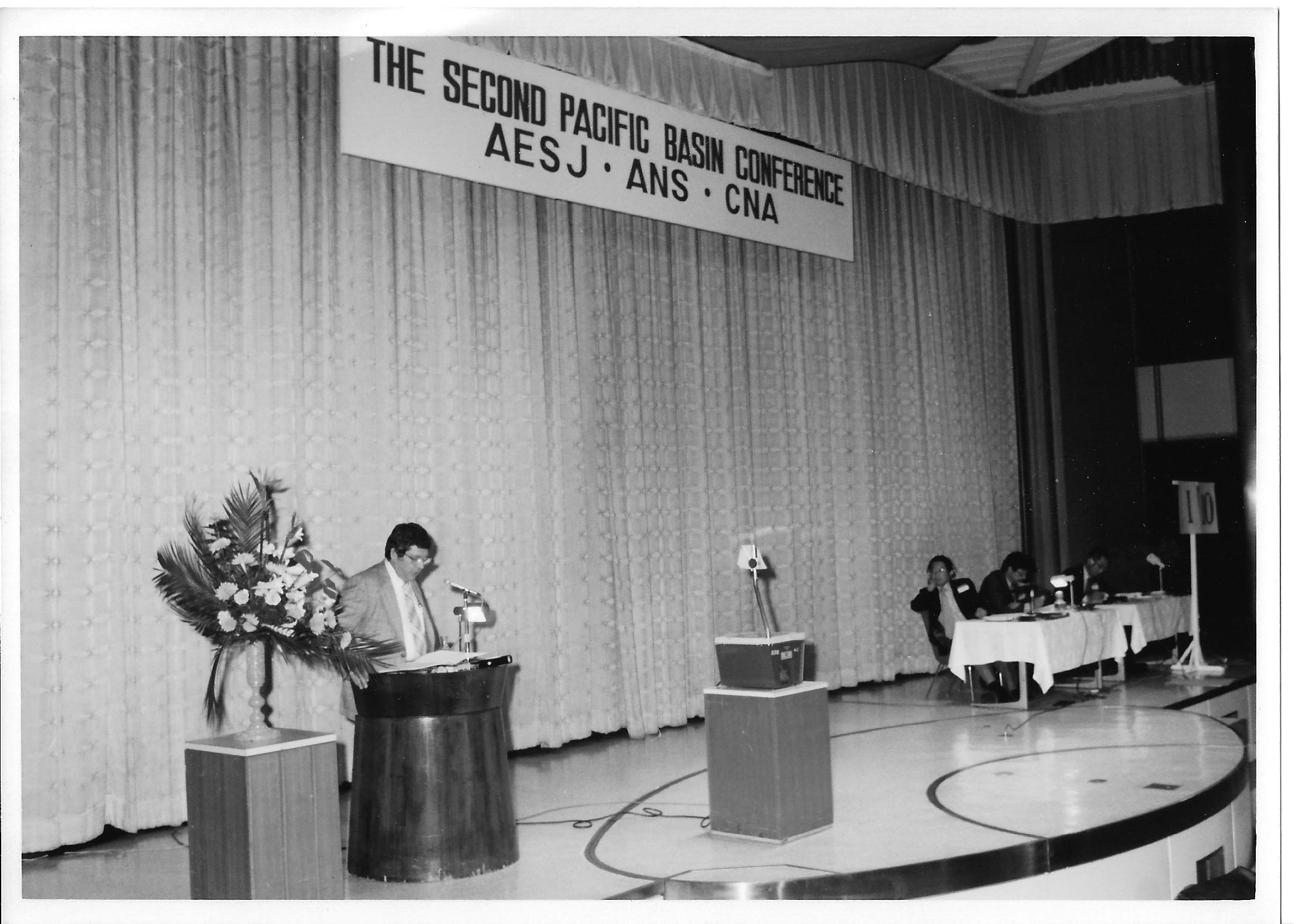
Robert L. Ferguson delivering President Carter's disappointing nuclear policy message about stopping the breeder reactor program and discontinuing nuclear fuel reprocessing at the Second Pacific Basin Conference in September 1978 in Tokyo, Japan.

By 1978, the U.S. led the world in numbers and efficiency of nuclear power plants. The chemistry of wartime reprocessing had been adapted to the commercial fuel cycle. Experimental breeder reactors, which could burn plutonium fuel more efficiently and also make more new plutonium fuel than it could consume, had furnished experience for the design and construction of commercial-sized demonstration plants. The European nations, Russia and Japan particularly, were building nuclear power plants and looking ahead to breeder reactors for the future. Therefore, President Carter's dramatic changes in U.S. nuclear energy policy to discontinue reprocessing spent nuclear fuel and terminate the U.S. Breeder Reactor Program, a program Ferguson himself had worked on and believed in, were abrupt and difficult for most countries to understand. Carter hoped that in setting this example, the U.S. would encourage other nations to follow its lead. Most nations went ahead with reprocessing and breeder development until high costs and loss of political support delayed plans in nuclear projects around the world.

Other major events that marked Ferguson's service at DOE were the gasoline shortages during the 1979 energy crisis caused by oil embargoes leveled at the United States during political upheaval in Iran, and the Three Mile Island accident at the nuclear power plant in Pennsylvania on March 28, 1979. On April 5, 1979, several days into the accident, Ferguson and his staff from DOE traveled to the Three-Mile Island site for a first-hand understanding of the cause, the damage done, and the recovery needs. The Nuclear Regulatory Commission (NRC) and utility owner Metropolitan Edison had not thought to involve the DOE, so Ferguson established a liaison between the NRC and the Office of Nuclear Programs because whatever lessons could be learned from the accident could be applied to other nuclear programs within DOE.

The Three Mile Island accident had a profound effect on the nuclear industry, resulting in the cancellation of 100 nuclear plants planned or ordered between 1972 and 1983. No new plants were licensed in the United States by the NRC from that time until 2012, and more than 80 anti-nuclear groups were formed in the United States out of fear of nuclear reactors after the Three Mile Island accident.

=== 1980–2022 — private sector nuclear energy industry/nuclear waste/medical isotopes ===
Washington Public Power Supply System: In 1980, Ferguson was selected by a national recruitment firm as a candidate for Chief Executive Officer of the troubled Washington Public Power Supply System (WPPSS), now called Energy Northwest, a municipal utility. His friend and mentor Senator Henry M. Jackson (“Scoop” Jackson) from Washington State encouraged him to take this job to get the construction projects for five nuclear power plants back on track for WPPSS, which were far behind schedule and over budget. Ferguson was WPPSS' first administrator with broad experience beyond the Northwest public utility community. He had turned around troubled nuclear construction projects before, such as the FFTF, and he and Jackson were convinced that the fate of the commercial nuclear industry was closely tied to the fate of the WPPSS projects.

The need for these projects was based on an independent projection of energy need for the region. Four of the power plants were eventually cancelled, and two of those projects, WNP-4 and -5, resulted in the largest municipal bond default in U.S. history at that time — $2.25 billion.

Eleven other nuclear and coal projects were also cancelled after regional power planners determined that the energy projections had been grossly over-estimated. Just one of the WPPSS nuclear power plant projects, WNP-2, in eastern Washington on the Hanford Site was completed. The plant was rechristened the Columbia Generating Station and is still in operation, providing low-cost, carbon-free electricity for customers of the Bonneville Power Administration.

After a tumultuous three years of enormous effort, from 1980 to 1983, which included chaotic open public meetings in Seattle, anti-nuclear protests, union labor strikes on the projects, and death threats that required Ferguson to travel with a bodyguard, he suffered a heart attack and underwent emergency open-heart surgery at Seattle's Swedish Hospital at age 49. He resigned from WPPSS soon after.

Companies Founder/Boards of Directors: In 1983, Ferguson first job after CEO of WPPSS was chairman of UNC Nuclear Industries. In 1985, he co-founded RL Ferguson and Associates, and sold that company to Science Applications International Corporation (SAIC) in 1991. He then founded a company that specialized in waste management, environmental consulting, and alternative energy called Nuvotec through which he acquired ATG, a nuclear waste company, and renamed it Pacific Eco Solutions. Ferguson also founded a computer-based nuclear safety training company called Vivid Learning Systems for the Hanford Site. Today, Vivid is an occupational health and safety training company.

In 2007, Ferguson sold Nuvotec to Perma-Fix Environmental Services and was appointed to its board of directors. He also served on the boards of UNC Nuclear Industries, Pacific Nuclear Services, Hanford Environmental Health Foundation, Frontier Federal Savings and Loan, Ben Franklin National Bank, Columbia Trust Bank, and British Nuclear Fuels, Inc. He was the last president of the Tri-City Nuclear Industrial Council (TRCNIC) and the first chairman and president of that organization's successor, the Tri-City Industrial Development Council (TRIDEC). Ferguson continues to serve as a director on the boards of Vivid Learning Systems and Perma-Fix Medical SA, a company based in Poland that developed an innovative method of generating medical isotopes that does not present proliferation risks.

== Career highlights ==
=== The Isaiah Project – 1991 to 1994 ===
On the dissolution of the Soviet Union in 1991, Ukraine was left in possession of the third largest nuclear arsenal in the world. Ferguson's company, R.L. Ferguson and Associates, developed the Isaiah Project to address the fate of Ukraine's nuclear weapons, which became the focus of intense proliferation concern by the United States and Russia. The Isaiah Project was a plan to implement Article VI of the Nonproliferation Treaty by converting plutonium from U.S. and Russian/Ukrainian nuclear weapons into MOX fuel (plutonium and uranium mixed oxide) to produce electricity. When Ferguson sold his company to SAIC, the sale was contingent on its continued support of The Isaiah Project.

The basic concept of the Isaiah Project was that the project partners — SAIC, Newport News Shipbuilding Corp., and Battelle Memorial Institute — would acquire two of the four partially completed reactor facilities shut down by WPPSS in Washington State, complete construction, and provide $2 billion in private financing for secure storage, under international safeguards, of the 1800 nuclear warheads left in Ukraine after the breakup of the Soviet Union. The plan would complete the reactor projects with private financing and then transfer them to DOE.

The proposed agreement required that the plutonium from dismantled nuclear weapons in the United States and Russia be converted into MOX fuel to provide fuel for the peaceful use of nuclear power plants to generate electricity for each country; thus the name Isaiah Project, in reference to Isaiah 2:4: “They will beat their swords into plowshares and their spears into pruning hooks.” The resultant burned fuel would meet the internationally accepted nonproliferation standard for commercial nuclear fuel. During the 40-year design life of the two WPPSS reactors, it would be possible to dispose of an estimated 80 tons of usable plutonium.

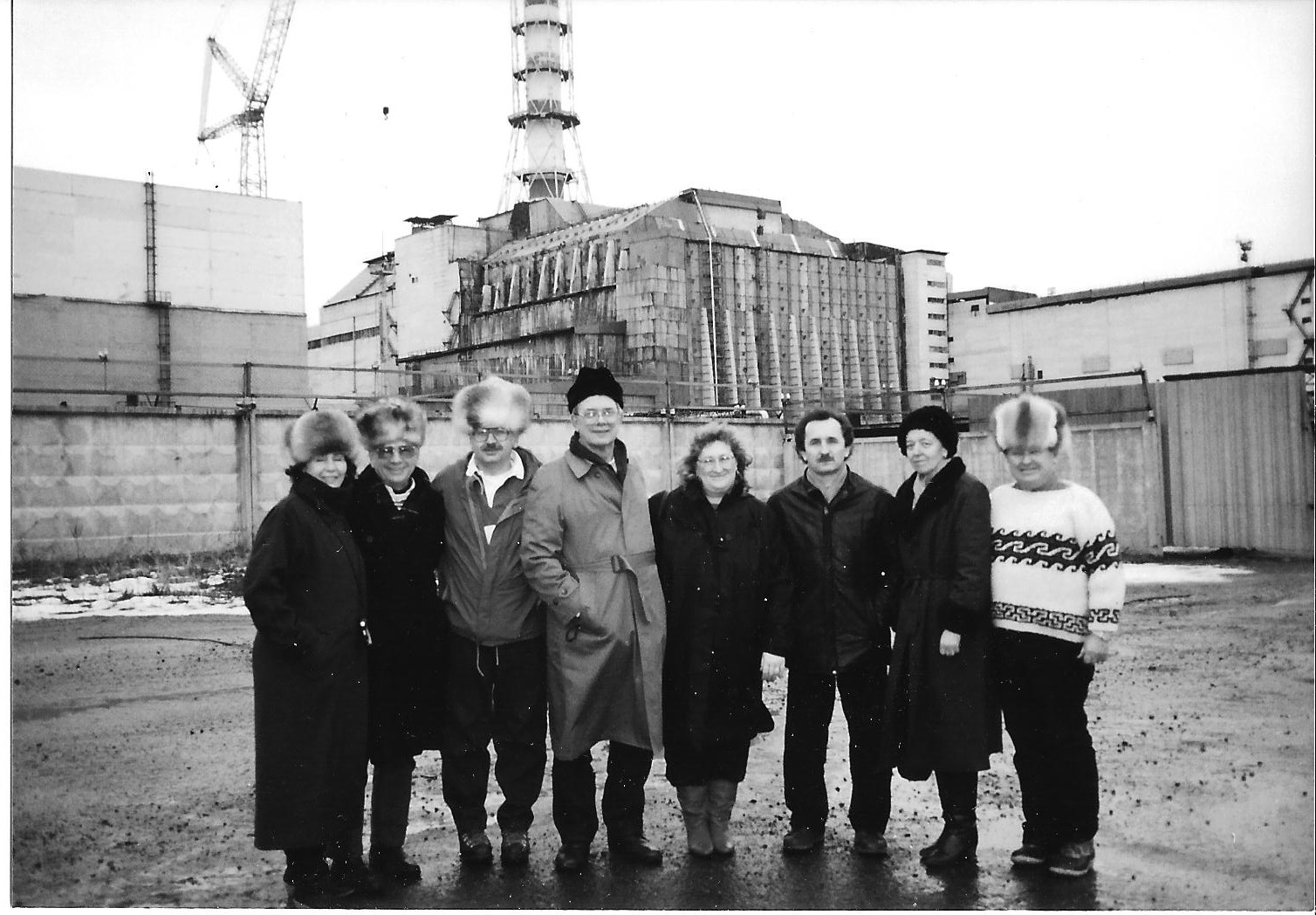
Wanda Briggs, Reporter for the Tri-City Herald; Robert L. Ferguson, CEO of Ferguson Financial Group, LLC; and the Isaiah Project Team standing in front of the Chernobyl Power Plant in Ukraine, 1994

The Isaiah Project proposal was promoted in Ukraine by Vladimir Shokoshitny, a member of the Ukrainian Rada (Parliament), and presented to Ukraine's President Leonid Kravchuk and the parliament in Kyiv and then to Russian officials in Moscow during a 10-day trip made by Ferguson and representatives of the Isaiah Project team in January/February 1994. Before leaving Kyiv, the Isaiah Project team briefed U.S. Ambassador Charles Miller, who arranged for a briefing in Moscow for Ambassador Tom Pickering.

Notwithstanding unofficial support from high-level U.S. officials, the Isaiah Project team was notified that the United States would not support the Isaiah Project proposal while they were waiting in Congressman Norm Dicks office for a scheduled meeting between President Clinton and President Kravchuk. Instead, the United States persuaded the Ukrainian Rada to ratify the Nonproliferation Treaty (NPT) and return all the nuclear weapons in Ukraine to Russia. In return, Ukraine was to be guaranteed its territorial integrity. Russia, Ukraine, Britain, and the United States formalized and strengthened security commitments to Ukraine on December 5, 1994, in a memorandum signed in Budapest at the summit of the Conference on Security and Co-operation in Europe. The agreement, called the Budapest Memorandum, stated that the nuclear-weapons states pledged to respect Ukraine's territorial integrity and abstain from economic coercion, the threat of force, or use of force.

Russia's 2015 takeover of the Ukrainian territory of Crimea was a blatant violation of the Budapest Memorandum on Security Assurances. In addition, Russia and the United States have yet to implement the Plutonium Management and Disposition Agreement (PMDA), signed in 2000 requiring each country to destroy 34 tons of weapons-grade plutonium by creating MOX fuel to be burned in nuclear power reactors. This was the same process proposed by the Isaiah Project more than 22 years ago.

=== Yucca Mountain Project Lawsuit – 2010 to 2013 ===
In February 2010, shortly after President Barack Obama and Energy Secretary Steven Chu unlawfully terminated the Yucca Mountain nuclear waste repository project, Ferguson and two other private citizens from Washington State filed a lawsuit against the President, the Department of Energy (DOE), and the Nuclear Regulatory Commission (NRC) to hold them accountable to the law of the Nuclear Waste Policy Act (NWPA). Similar suits filed by Aiken County, South Carolina, and the states of Washington and South Carolina; the National Association of Regulatory Utility Commissioners; and Nye County, Nevada, were combined by the D.C. Circuit Court of Appeals into one lawsuit.

In August 2013, the court made a landmark ruling on the case, granting the petitioners a writ of mandamus ordering the NRC to follow the law and resume the Yucca Mountain license review.

Two of the three judges on the panel agreed that the NRC had violated the NWPA when its former chairman, Gregory Jaczko, stopped the Yucca Mountain license review and withheld the Safety Evaluation Reports (SERs), which were due to be released to Congress and the public.

Circuit Judge Brett Kavanaugh wrote in his opinion, “This case raises significant questions about the scope of the Executive’s authority to disregard federal statutes. The underlying policy debate is not our concern. The policy is for Congress and the President to establish as they see fit in enacting statutes, and for the President and subordinate executive agencies to implement within statutory boundaries.” Kavanaugh concluded that the President and federal agencies “may not ignore statutory mandates or prohibitions merely because of policy disagreements with Congress.”

The dissenting judge, Chief Judge Merrick Garland, did not contest the law in the decision, but wrote simply that the lack of funds would make the court's ruling “useless” because it amounted to “little more than ordering the commission to spend part of those funds unpacking its boxes, and the remainder packing them up again.” However, the NRC testified during the court hearing that the remaining $11.1 million designated for the Yucca Mountain review would be enough to at least publicly release the Yucca Mountain SERs that Jaczko had held back.

By January 30, 2015, the NRC had completed and released all five volumes of the Yucca Mountain SER, concluding that Nevada's Yucca Mountain met all of its technical and safety requirements for the disposal of highly radioactive nuclear waste, stating that “DOE’s proposed repository as designed will be capable of safely isolating used nuclear fuel and high-level radioactive waste for the 1-million-year period specified in the regulations.”

Completion of the safety evaluation report does not represent an agency decision on whether to authorize construction. A final licensing decision, should funds beyond those currently available be appropriated, could come only after completion of a supplement to the DOE's environmental impact statement, hearings on contentions in the adjudication, and Commission review.

== Personal life ==
In 1956, Ferguson married Catherine “Katie” Anne Crosby (born May 18, 1934; died 2018); they have two daughters, Catherine Joy Kolinski (1957) and Colleen Lowry (1960); and three grandchildren, Ashley Joy Berkshire, Michael Joy, and Keefe Lowry.

Katie Crosby Ferguson is the niece of the iconic singer and actor Bing Crosby. Her father, Edward “Ted” Crosby, was Bing's older brother. Katie's half-brother Howard Crosby is an entrepreneur and a singer with a voice that is reminiscent of his famous Uncle Bing's, and performs for charities in the United States and Ireland.

In recognition of the Fergusons’ commitment to higher education, the Father Gordon Toner Scholarship was established at Gonzaga Preparatory School.
