= Cordova Theater =

- U.S. National Register of Historic Places
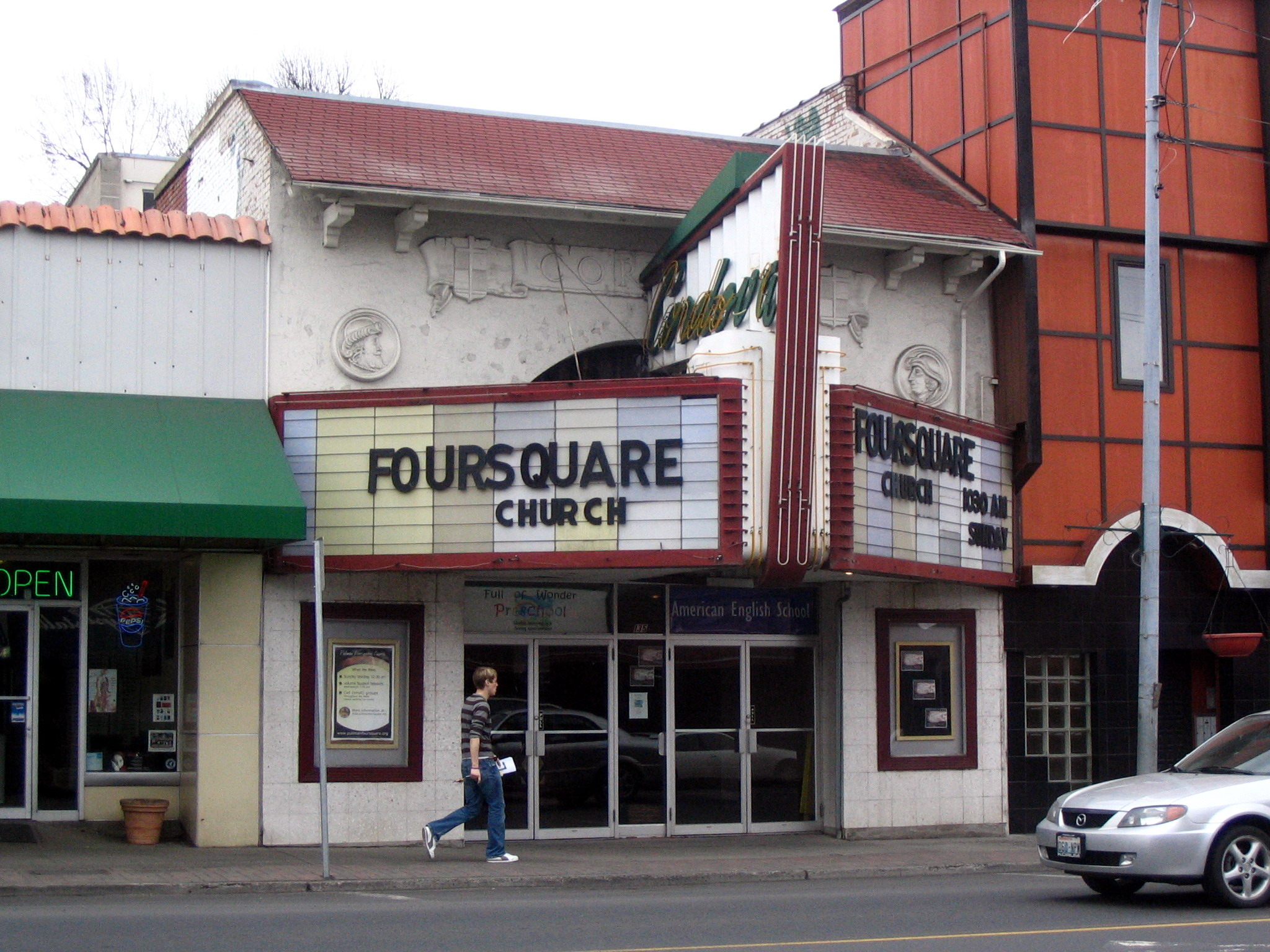

- Location within Washington (state)
- Location: 135 N. Grand Ave., Pullman, Washington
- Coordinates: 46°43′57″N 117°10′54″W
- Area: less than one acre
- Built: 1927
- Architect: Whitehouse & Price; Berg, Carl R.
- Architectural style: Mission/Spanish Revival
- MPS: Movie Theaters in Washington State MPS
- NRHP reference No.: 04000200
- Added to NRHP: March 18, 2004

The Cordova Theater in Pullman, Washington is a Mission/Spanish Revival style theater that was designed by architects Whitehouse & Price and interior decorator Carl R. Berg. It was constructed in 1927. "In 1950 an "Art Deco-style marquee with neon lighting" was added.

It was listed on the National Register of Historic Places in 2004, at which time it had run movies for "76 years and [was] the oldest and longest-running movie house in Pullman".
