= Christ Episcopal Church (Puyallup, Washington) =

Historic church in Washington, United States

- U.S. National Register of Historic Places
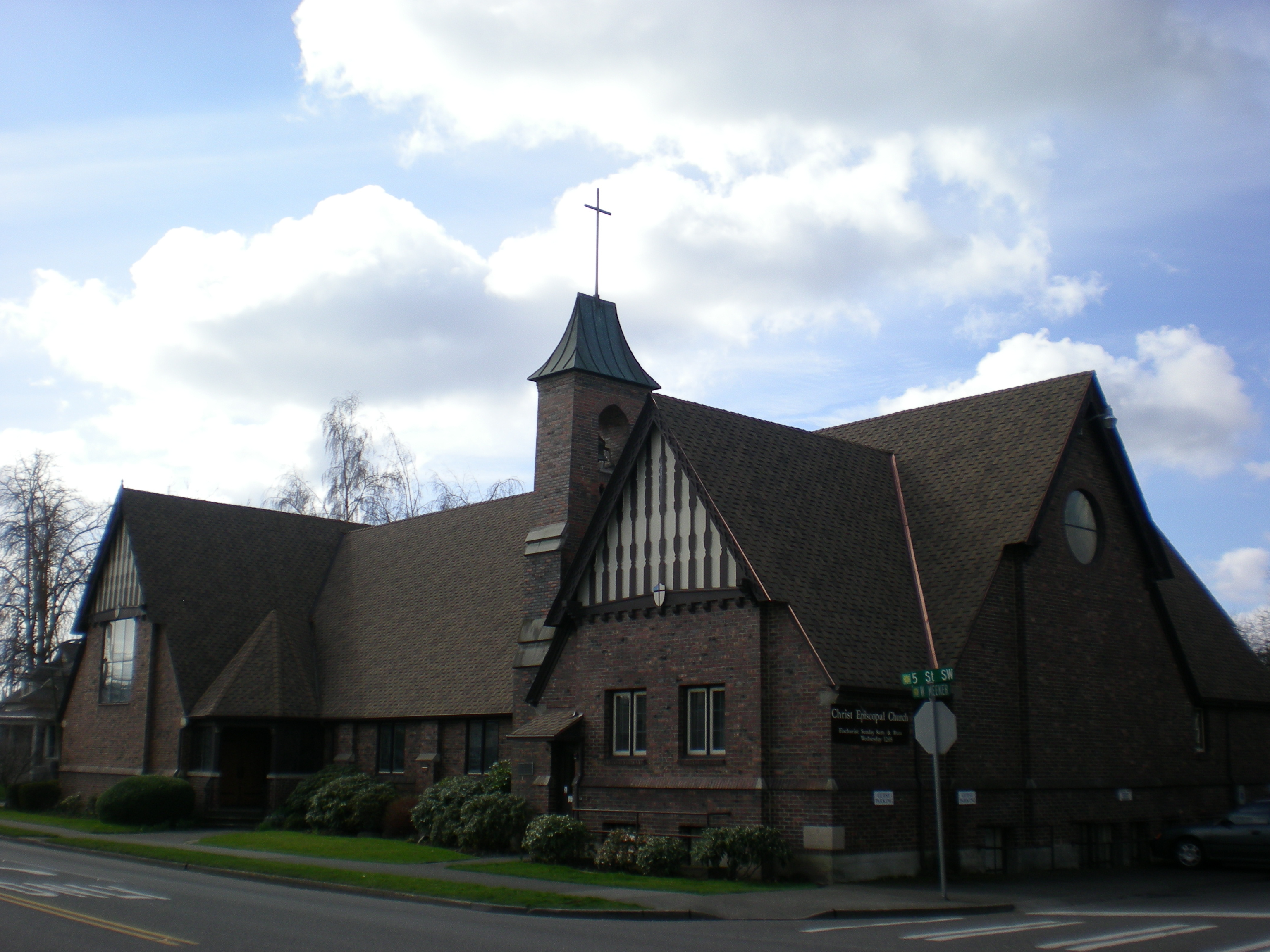

- Location within Washington (state)
- Location: 210 Fifth St. SW., Puyallup, Washington
- Coordinates: 47°11′27″N 122°17′53″W
- Area: less than one acre
- Built: 1926
- Architect: Whitehouse & Price
- Architectural style: Tudor Revival
- NRHP reference No.: 94001440
- Added to NRHP: December 15, 1994

Christ Episcopal Church is a historic church 210 Fifth Street SW in Puyallup, Washington.

It was built in 1926 in a Tudor Revival style and was added to the National Register in 1994.
