= Dover Church =

Historic church in Idaho, United States

- U.S. National Register of Historic Places
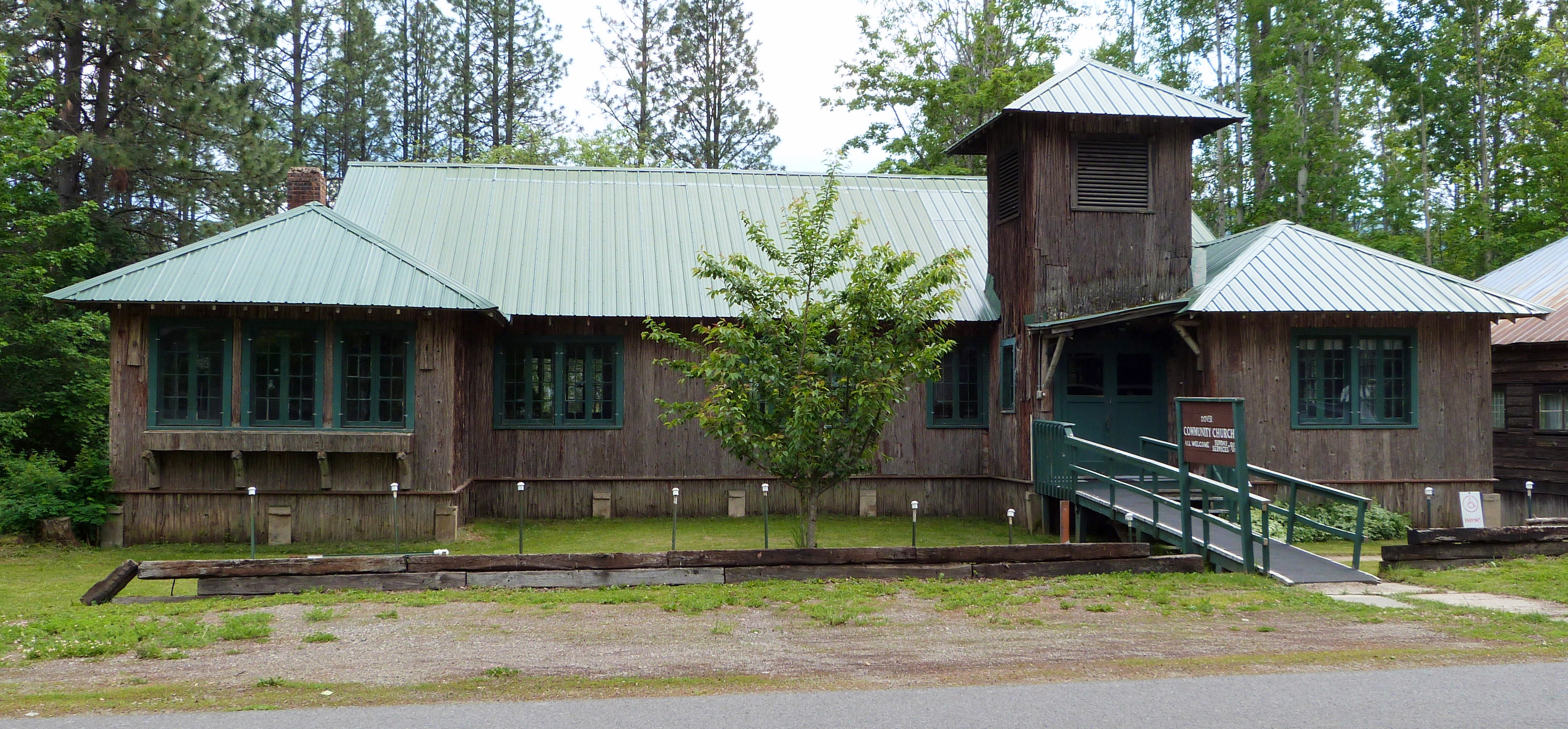
- Dover Church in 2015

- Location within Idaho Location within the United States
- Location: Washington between Third and Fourth, Dover, Idaho; United States
- Coordinates: 48°14′53″N 116°36′22″W
- Area: 0.3 acres (0.12 ha)
- Built: 1922
- Architect: Whitehouse & Price
- Architectural style: Rustic style
- NRHP reference No.: 86002153
- Added to NRHP: August 8, 1989

The Dover Church in Dover, Idaho, United States, was designed by Whitehouse & Price and was built in 1922. It was listed on the National Register of Historic Places in 1989.

It was built as a summer cottage in Laclede for lumber businessman A.C. White and his family, but it was not completed before the A.C. White lumber mill and factory in Laclede burned. Like many other houses, it was moved by barge on the Pend Oreille River to Dover in 1923, where a new mill was built. It became a church, and is unusual as a church for its rustic style.

== See also ==
- National Register of Historic Places listings in Bonner County, Idaho
