= Rosebush House =

Historic house in Washington, United States

- U.S. National Register of Historic Places
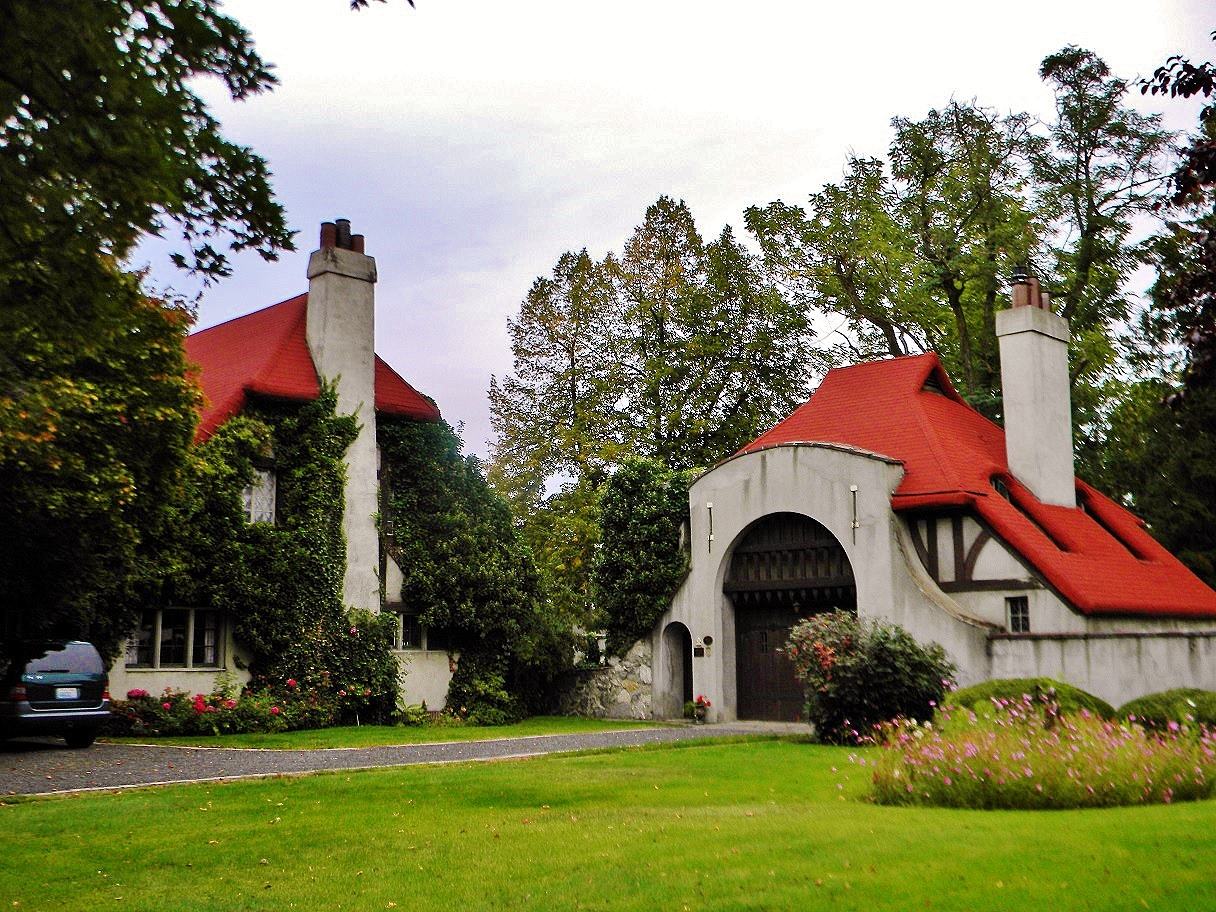

- Location within Washington (state)
- Location: 3318 N. Marguerite Rd., Millwood, Washington
- Coordinates: 47°41′15″N 117°17′2″W
- Area: less than one acre
- Built: 1923
- Architect: Whitehouse, Harold
- Architectural style: Late 19th and 20th Century Revivals
- NRHP reference No.: 00001446
- Added to NRHP: November 22, 2000

The Rosebush House in Millwood, Washington, was designed by architect Harold C. Whitehouse and was built in 1923. It was listed on the U.S. National Register of Historic Places in 2000. According to its NRHP nomination, "is a landmark example of the French Eclectic architectural style and is one of the most unique properties in the Spokane area."

When the Millwood Historic District was added to the NRHP in 2001, the Rosebush House was listed as a contributing property to the district.
