= Millwood, Washington =

City in Washington, United States

Millwood
- City
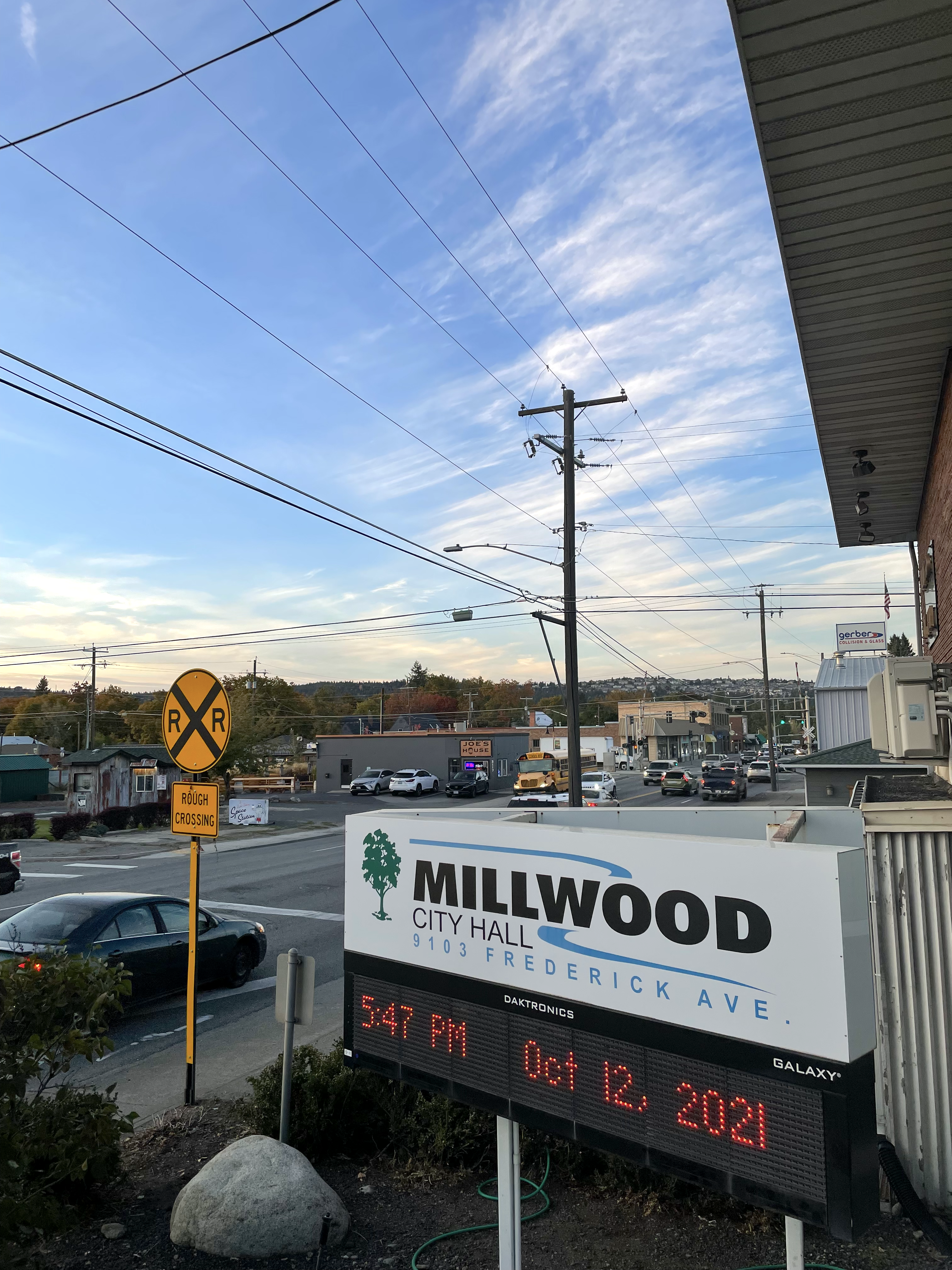

- Location of Millwood, Washington
- Coordinates: 47°41′08″N 117°16′50″W
- Country: United States
- State: Washington
- County: Spokane
- Incorporated: October 26, 1927

Government
  - Type: Mayor–council
  - Mayor: Shawna Beese

Area
  - Total: 0.70 sq mi (1.82 km^{2})
  - Land: 0.69 sq mi (1.80 km^{2})
  - Water: 0.0039 sq mi (0.01 km^{2})
- Elevation: 1,949 ft (594 m)

Population (2020)
  - Total: 1,881
  - Estimate (2019): 1,800
  - Density: 2,585.8/sq mi (998.38/km^{2})
- Time zone: UTC-8 (Pacific (PST))
  - Summer (DST): UTC-7 (PDT)
- ZIP code: 99212
- Area code: 509
- FIPS code: 53-45985
- GNIS feature ID: 2413003
- Website: millwoodwa.us

Millwood is a city in Spokane County, Washington, United States. As of the 2020 census, the city had a population of 1,881. Millwood is a suburb of Spokane, and is surrounded on three sides by the city of Spokane Valley. The Spokane River flows along the northern edge of the city. The city is home to the Millwood Historic District, which is listed on the National Register of Historic Places.

== History ==
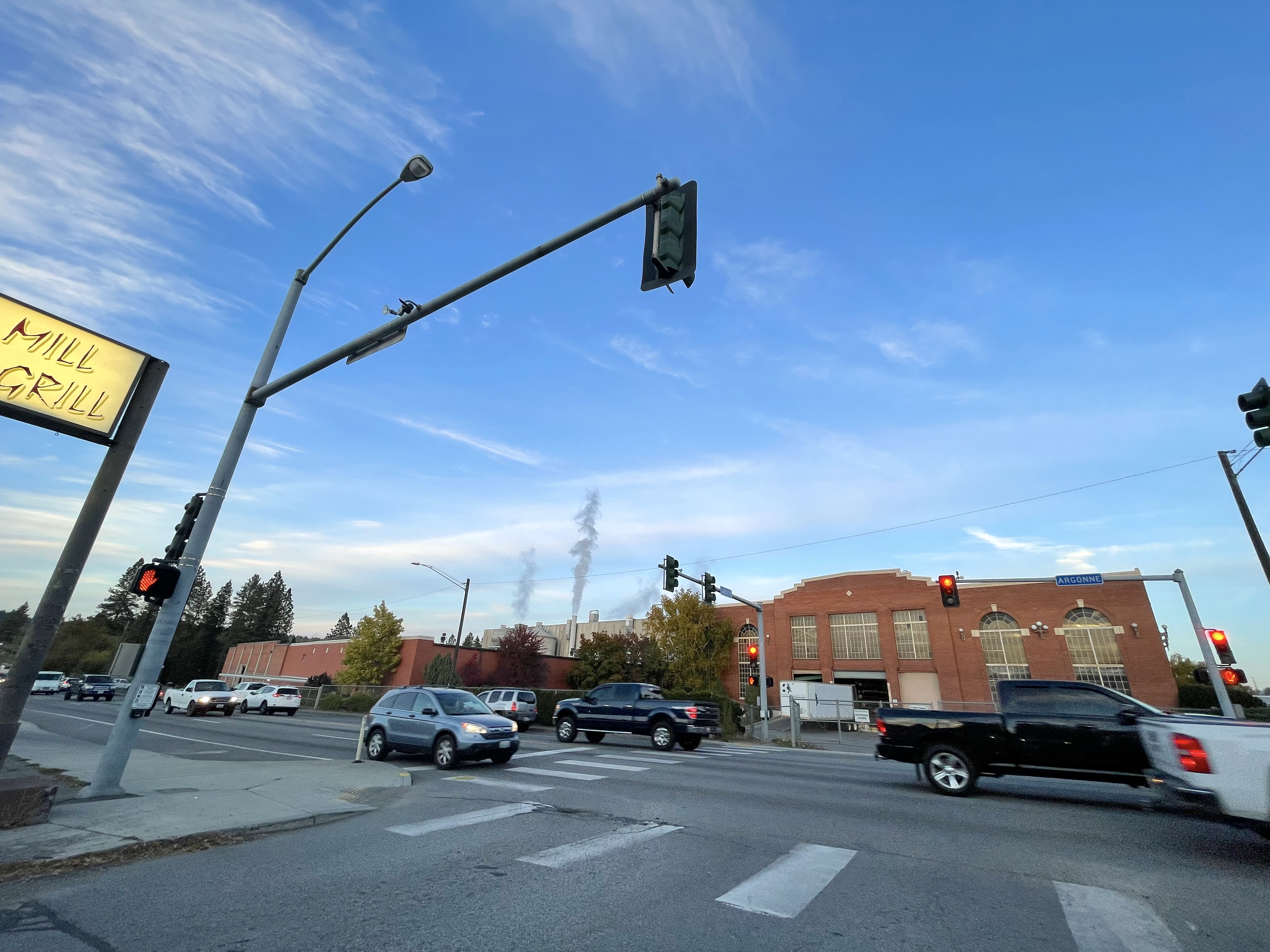
The Inland Empire Paper Company facility in Millwood, the town's namesake

Millwood was officially incorporated as a town on October 26, 1927. It was named for the local sawmill.

According to the Tacoma Public Library's Washington Place Names database: "In 1900, it was chosen as a station by the Spokane-Coeur d'Alene Electric Railway, and was named Woodard's for the family who owned the land along the railway route. When Inland Empire Paper Company built a paper mill they requested a name change to Milltown. Railway officials refused the change unless the Woodard family agreed. A compromise resulted, using the word mill combined with the first four letters of Woodard. It was incorporated October 27, 1927."

The Rosebush House, located in the center of Millwood, "is one of Millwood's best preserved homes" and is listed on the U.S. National Register of Historic Places.

In March 2008, Millwood was reclassified as a city.

== Geography ==
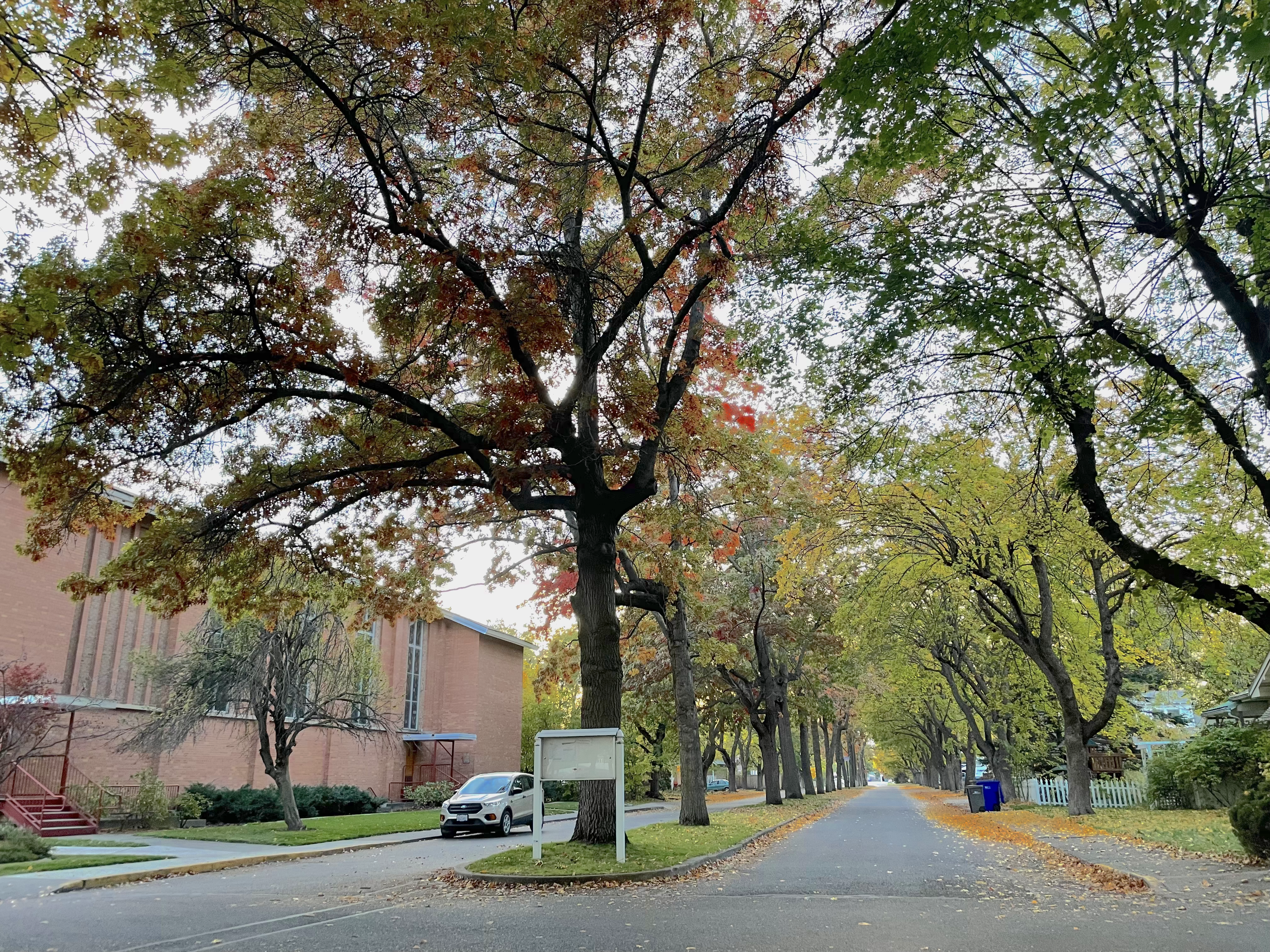
Dalton Avenue is one of Millwood's many tree-lined streets.

According to the United States Census Bureau, the town has a total area of 0.73 square miles (1.89 km^{2}), of which, 0.70 square miles (1.81 km^{2}) is land and 0.03 square miles (0.08 km^{2}) is water.

The topography of the city is mostly flat as it lies on the floor of the Spokane Valley, though it does slope gently down towards the north. The northern edge of town is defined by the Spokane River, where the terrain promptly drops about 20 feet down to the river bank.

Two major arterials pass through Millwood. Argonne Road bisects the city before crossing the Spokane River, providing the only river crossing for automobiles between Greene Street in Spokane, five miles to the west, and Trent Avenue three miles to the east. Trent Avenue, carrying Washington State Route 290, marks the southern limit of the city. The intersection of Argonne and Trent is home to a shopping center. The Argonne exit of Interstate 90 is located half-a-mile south of Millwood.

West Valley High School, which serves Millwood and surrounding areas, is located on the western boundary of the town.

=== Climate ===
This region experiences warm (but not hot) and dry summers, with no average monthly temperatures above 71.6 °F. According to the Köppen Climate Classification system, Millwood has a warm-summer Mediterranean climate, abbreviated "Csb" on climate maps.

== Demographics ==
Historical population
| Census | Pop. | Note | %± |
|---|---|---|---|
| 1930 | 493 | | — |
| 1940 | 717 | | 45.4% |
| 1950 | 1,240 | | 72.9% |
| 1960 | 1,776 | | 43.2% |
| 1970 | 1,770 | | −0.3% |
| 1980 | 1,717 | | −3.0% |
| 1990 | 1,559 | | −9.2% |
| 2000 | 1,649 | | 5.8% |
| 2010 | 1,786 | | 8.3% |
| 2020 | 1,881 | | 5.3% |
U.S. Decennial Census

=== 2020 census ===
As of the 2020 census, Millwood had a population of 1,881. The median age was 40.4 years; 20.7% of residents were under the age of 18 and 17.0% were 65 years of age or older. For every 100 females there were 100.3 males, and for every 100 females age 18 and over there were 101.1 males age 18 and over.

100.0% of residents lived in urban areas, while 0.0% lived in rural areas.

There were 768 households in Millwood, of which 29.7% had children under the age of 18 living in them. Of all households, 44.5% were married-couple households, 22.3% were households with a male householder and no spouse or partner present, and 25.0% were households with a female householder and no spouse or partner present. About 29.8% of all households were made up of individuals and 11.4% had someone living alone who was 65 years of age or older.

There were 821 housing units, of which 6.5% were vacant. The homeowner vacancy rate was 3.2% and the rental vacancy rate was 6.8%.

Racial composition as of the 2020 census
| Race | Number | Percent |
|---|---|---|
| White | 1,634 | 86.9% |
| Black or African American | 24 | 1.3% |
| American Indian and Alaska Native | 11 | 0.6% |
| Asian | 18 | 1.0% |
| Native Hawaiian and Other Pacific Islander | 8 | 0.4% |
| Some other race | 28 | 1.5% |
| Two or more races | 158 | 8.4% |
| Hispanic or Latino (of any race) | 96 | 5.1% |

=== 2010 census ===
As of the 2010 census, there were 1,786 people, 751 households, and 467 families living in the town. The population density was 2,551.4 inhabitants per square mile (985.1/km^{2}). There were 793 housing units at an average density of 1,132.9 per square mile (437.4/km^{2}). The racial makeup of the town was 94.4% White, 0.6% African American, 1.3% Native American, 1.1% Asian, 0.3% Pacific Islander, 0.6% from other races, and 1.7% from two or more races. Hispanic or Latino of any race were 1.9% of the population.

There were 751 households, of which 30.2% had children under the age of 18 living with them, 46.2% were married couples living together, 11.2% had a female householder with no husband present, 4.8% had a male householder with no wife present, and 37.8% were non-families. 31.2% of all households were made up of individuals, and 10.8% had someone living alone who was 65 years of age or older. The average household size was 2.37 and the average family size was 2.94.

The median age in the town was 40.1 years. 22.6% of residents were under the age of 18; 7.3% were between the ages of 18 and 24; 27.5% were from 25 to 44; 29.6% were from 45 to 64; and 13% were 65 years of age or older. The gender makeup of the town was 49.8% male and 50.2% female.

== Government ==
Millwood is a non-charter code city that has a mayor–council government. The five members of the city council and the mayor are elected to four-year terms by registered voters in the city. Since 2026, the mayor has been Shawna Beese, a former city councilmember. She succeeded Kevin Freeman, who served as mayor for 12 years before his retirement.

== Education ==
The city is served by the West Valley School District.
