= Dover, Idaho =

- City
- Location of Dover in Bonner County, Idaho.
- Coordinates: 48°15′25″N 116°37′02″W
- Country: United States
- State: Idaho
- County: Bonner
- Incorporated: July 26, 1988

Area
  - Total: 3.21 sq mi (8.31 km^{2})
  - Land: 3.17 sq mi (8.21 km^{2})
  - Water: 0.039 sq mi (0.10 km^{2})
- Elevation: 2,474 ft (754 m)

Population (2020)
  - Total: 752
  - Density: 237/sq mi (91.6/km^{2})
- Time zone: UTC-8 (Pacific (PST))
  - Summer (DST): UTC-7 (PDT)
- ZIP code: 83825
- Area codes: 208, 986
- FIPS code: 16-22510
- GNIS feature ID: 2410351
- Website: cityofdover.id.gov

Dover is a city in Bonner County, Idaho. The population was 752 at the 2020 census.

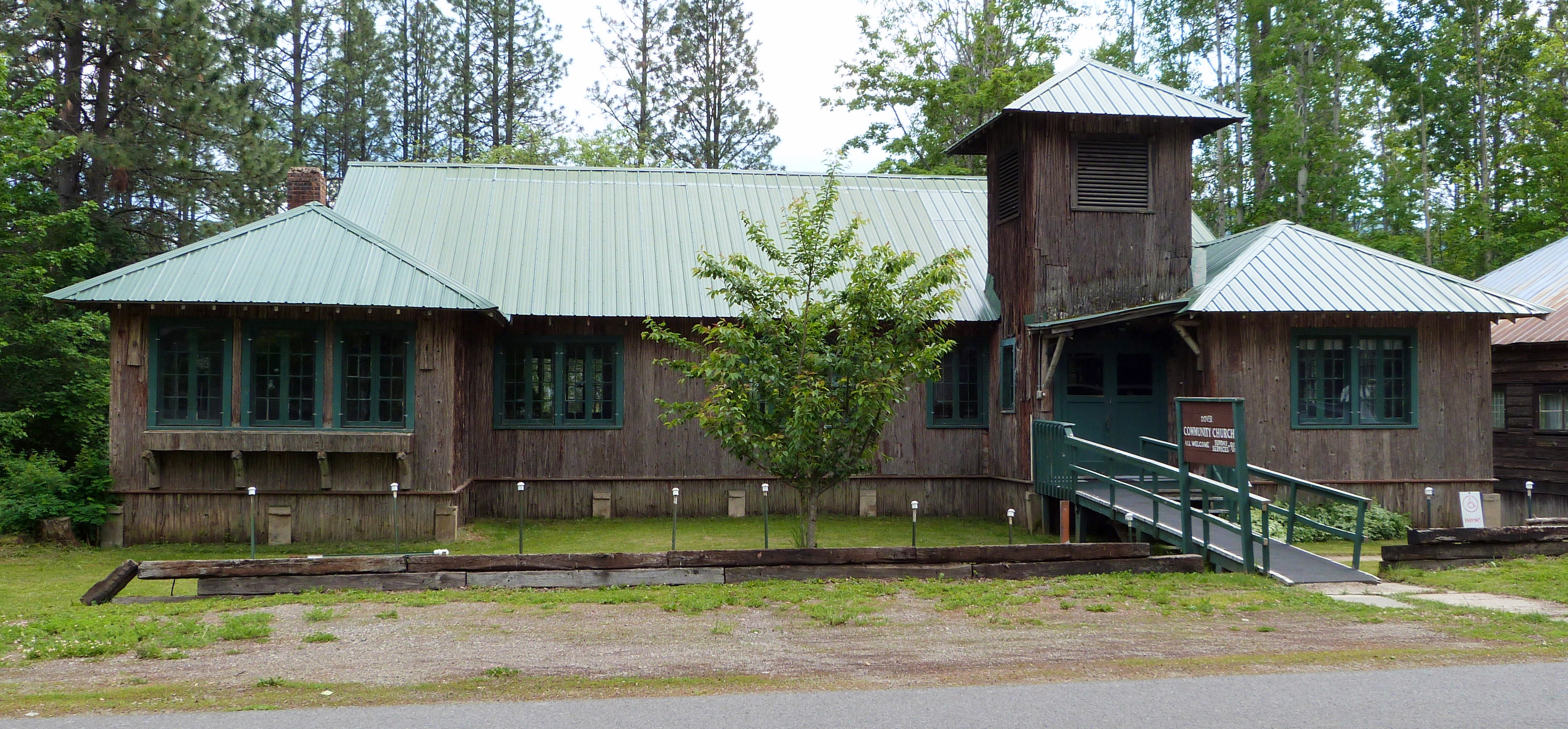
The historic Dover Church in Dover, May 2015

== Geography ==
According to the United States Census Bureau, the city has a total area of 3.24 square miles (8.39 km^{2}), of which, 3.22 square miles (8.34 km^{2}) is land and 0.02 square miles (0.05 km^{2}) is water.

== Demographics ==
Historical population
| Census | Pop. | Note | %± |
|---|---|---|---|
| 1990 | 294 | | — |
| 2000 | 342 | | 16.3% |
| 2010 | 556 | | 62.6% |
| 2020 | 752 | | 35.3% |
U.S. Decennial Census

=== 2010 census ===
As of the census of 2010, there were 556 people, 220 households, and 175 families living in the city. The population density was 172.7 inhabitants per square mile (66.7/km^{2}). There were 327 housing units at an average density of 101.6 per square mile (39.2/km^{2}). The racial makeup of the city was 96.8% White, 0.5% Native American, 0.4% Asian, 0.7% from other races, and 1.6% from two or more races. Hispanic or Latino of any race were 2.5% of the population.

There were 220 households, of which 33.6% had children under the age of 18 living with them, 68.6% were married couples living together, 6.8% had a female householder with no husband present, 4.1% had a male householder with no wife present, and 20.5% were non-families. 17.3% of all households were made up of individuals, and 4.1% had someone living alone who was 65 years of age or older. The average household size was 2.52 and the average family size was 2.85.

The median age in the city was 43.7 years. 24.5% of residents were under the age of 18; 4.5% were between the ages of 18 and 24; 23% were from 25 to 44; 32.2% were from 45 to 64; and 15.8% were 65 years of age or older. The gender makeup of the city was 52.7% male and 47.3% female.

=== 2000 census ===
As of the census of 2000, there were 342 people, 147 households, and 95 families living in the city. The population density was 255.6 inhabitants per square mile (98.7/km^{2}). There were 157 housing units at an average density of 117.3 per square mile (45.3/km^{2}). The racial makeup of the city was 96.20% White, 0.88% Native American, and 2.92% from two or more races. Hispanic or Latino of any race were 0.58% of the population.

There were 147 households, out of which 26.5% had children under the age of 18 living with them, 54.4% were married couples living together, 7.5% had a female householder with no husband present, and 34.7% were non-families. 26.5% of all households were made up of individuals, and 10.2% had someone living alone who was 65 years of age or older. The average household size was 2.33 and the average family size was 2.79.

In the city, the population was spread out, with 20.2% under the age of 18, 7.0% from 18 to 24, 20.5% from 25 to 44, 32.2% from 45 to 64, and 20.2% who were 65 years of age or older. The median age was 46 years. For every 100 females, there were 113.8 males. For every 100 females age 18 and over, there were 120.2 males.

The median income for a household in the city was $36,250, and the median income for a family was $40,000. Males had a median income of $31,875 versus $24,688 for females. The per capita income for the city was $27,861. About 2.8% of families and 3.9% of the population were below the poverty line, including 5.4% of those under age 18 and none of those age 65 or over.

== Notable person ==
- Robert Ferguson, physicist

== See also ==
- List of cities in Idaho
