= Morning Star Boys' Ranch =

Coordinates: 47°36′44″N 117°19′36″W

Morning Star Boys' Ranch is a residential facility for youths in Spokane, Washington. It was established in 1956. Morning Star Boys' Ranch achieved national accreditation for Council on Accreditation in July 2019.

== Controversies ==
The Morning Stars Boys’ Ranch has been subject to multiple lawsuits alleging sexual and physical abuse of the children placed in its care. The priest overseeing the boys during the time of the alleged physical and sexual abuse were reinstated to the church in 2015.

Beginning in 2005, persons who experienced alleged sexual and physical abuse as children began bringing lawsuits against the facility. Several claimed that they were sexually abused by the priest, who was reinstated, when they were children in the care of Morning Star Boys’ Ranch. By 2007, thirteen people who were in the care of the facility had brought lawsuits for physical and sexual abuse. According to documents produced through public records requests, reports of molestation and rape exist beginning in 1978.

== Services ==
=== Murphy House ===
Murphy House is a residential care facility for boys ages 6 to 12. The residential program implements best practices in treatment programs. This program sets behavioral improvement goals for each boy in social skills, emotional regulation and education, with boys that range in age from 6 to 12 years. Once a boy graduates from Morning Star Boys’ Ranch and is either reunified with parents/kinship or receives a foster care placement, he continues to receive a continuum of care through additional services which include: In Home Wrap Around Program, Morning Star Foster Care Services respite, case aide and Morning Star Community Services.

=== Morning Star Case Aide Program ===
Morning Star Case Aide Program-(serving all children from infant to 18 years). Morning Star Case Aide Program provides a service to our community with outstanding outcomes. Established in 2015, Morning Star Case Aide Program provides supports to children and families who have identified needs for additional stabilization. Services include: parent training, an in-home case aide, family therapy, and like skills mentoring.

=== Morning Star Foster Care Services ===
Morning Star Foster Care Services, a child placement agency, was launched in 2015. It recruits and licenses foster families for boys from the ranch and for other children in the community, and focuses on BRS foster care homes.

=== Morning Star In-Home Wrap Around Care ===
Morning Star In-Home Wrap Around Care Established in 2015 and provides support to children that have been in care at the Murphy House Residential and have transitioned to a foster care home or been reunified with parents or kinship. With a continuum of care from Morning Star the goal is to provide additional stabilization within the home. Services include: parent training, case management, family therapy, life skills mentoring, overnight respite, and 24 hour on-call crisis intervention.
