= Morning Star (ship) =

Several vessels have been named Morning Star for the Morning Star:

- De Ochtendster (The Morning Star in Dutch), took part in the Battle of Gibraltar (1607)
- Morning Star (was a merchant ship seized by the English at St. Cruz in Tenerife in 1655, during the blockade of the Canary Islands in the conflict with Spain
- HMS Morning Star (1763) was a one-and-a-half year old cutter that the British Royal Navy purchased in 1763. It sold her in 1773. She then became a slave ship, first under her original name and then as Fanny. She was last listed in 1778.
- Morning Star was an American schooner privateer of 32, or 54 tons (bm), one gun, and 50 men under the command of Captain A.Tucker. He commissioned her at Portland, Maine on 12 July 1812. HMS Maidstone captured Morning Star in the Bay of Fundy and burnt her on 1 August.
- Morning Star (1809 ship) was a schooner launched in 1805 in the United States of America, possibly under another name. From 1809 she sailed under British registry. She sailed to Africa, the Mediterranean, and South America. She was last listed in 1833.
- Morning Star (1813 ship) was launched at Calcutta, India. She was wrecked in Torres Strait near Quoin Island, Queensland in July 1814.
- Morning Star (1825 ship) was launched at Scarborough. She spent her entire career sailing to Ceylon (later via Australia). In 1828 pirates captured her and killed many of her crew and passengers and raped the women passengers. Fortuitously, she and the survivors on board were rescued. Until the British East India Company (EIC) gave up its shipping activities in 1834, Morning Star sailed under a licence from the EIC. She was last listed in 1857, but had disappeared from ship arrival and departure data after 1853.
- Morning Star (1862 ship) was launched in Trenton, Michigan. She was wrecked off Lorain, Ohio in June 1868.
- Morning Star, former name of the cruise ship Salamis Glory
- Morning Star of Revelation (TS-K182), a British sail-training ketch
- Morning Star, the first Star Ferry in Hong Kong, and several later ferries by the same name in the same fleet

== See also ==
- HMS Morning Star – one of four vessels of the British Royal Navy
