= Morning Star =

Morning Star, morning star, or Morningstar may refer to:

== Astronomy ==
- Morning star, most commonly used as a name for the planet Venus when it appears in the east before sunrise
  - See also Venus in culture
- Morning star, a name for the star Sirius, because of the importance of its heliacal rising, thereafter it appears in the sky just before sunrise from early July to mid-September
- Morning star, a (less common) name for the planet Mercury when it appears in the east before sunrise
- Heliacal rising, the astronomical occurrence when a star rises and becomes visible over the eastern horizon before sunrise, thus becoming a morning star

== Mythology and theology ==
- Aurvandil, the Morning Star, or Rising Star, in Germanic mythology
- At-Tariq, a chapter of the Quran
- Barnumbirr, a creator-spirit in the Yolngu culture of Australia
- Jesus, self-described as "the bright Morning Star" in the Christian Bible
- John the Baptist, called a "bright morning star" in Eastern Orthodox Church hymnology
- Lucifer, a name based on the Latin name for the Morning Star
- Mary, mother of Jesus, called "morning star" in the Litany of Loreto
- Morning Star, one of the Zorya (goddesses in Slavic mythology)
- Morningstar or Red Horn, a culture hero in Siouan oral traditions
- Morning Star ceremony, an historical ritual ceremony in Pawnee mythology
- Morning Star ceremony, a Yolngu (Aboriginal Australian) ceremony associated with Barnumbirr
- Phosphorus (morning star), the Morning Star in Greek mythology
- Tlāhuizcalpantecuhtli, god of the morning star (Venus) Aztec mythology

== People ==
- John Wycliffe, English theologian, sometimes referred to as the "Morning Star of the Reformation"
- Morning Star (chief) (1810–1883), Northern Cheyenne leader, also known as Dull Knife
- Chip Morningstar, American author, developer, programmer and designer of software systems
- Darren Morningstar (born 1969), American basketball player
- Erica Morningstar (born 1989), Canadian swimmer
- Richard Morningstar (born 1945), ambassador, Special Envoy of the US Secretary of State for Eurasian Energy

== Places ==
=== Settlements in the United States ===
- Morning Star, Arkansas, an unincorporated community
- Morning Star, Virginia, an unincorporated community
- Morning Star, West Virginia, an unincorporated community
- Morningstar, U.S. Virgin Islands

=== Water features ===
- Morning Star Lake (Glacier County, Montana), US
- Morning Star Lake (Nebraska), US
- Morning Star River, County Limerick, Ireland, flows into River Maigue

=== Other places ===
- Morningstar Airfield, near Cape Town, Western Cape, South Africa
- Morningstar Mill, a heritage site in St. Catharines, Ontario, Canada

== Transportation ==
=== Ships ===
- HMS Morning Star, six ships of the Royal Navy
- Morning Star, original name of the USS Estes, an amphibious force command ship
- Morning Star (ship), one of many vessels of that name
- Morning Star, former name of the cruise ship Salamis Glory
- Morning Star of Revelation (TS-K182), a British sail-training ketch
- Morning Star, the first Star Ferry in Hong Kong, and several later ferries by the same name in the same fleet
- De Ochtendster (The Morning Star in Dutch), took part in the Battle of Gibraltar (1607)

=== In railways ===
- Morning Star (train), passenger train formerly operated by St. Louis Southwestern Railway
- GWR Star Class "Morning Star", broad gauge steam locomotive

== Businesses and organizations ==
=== Businesses ===
- Morningstar Farms, a brand of vegetarian food
- Morning Star Series, a brand of incense
- Morningstar Air Express, a cargo airline based in Edmonton, Alberta, Canada
- Morningstar, Inc., an American investment research firm based in Chicago
- The Morning Star Company, a California-based agribusiness and food processing company

=== Organizations ===
- Morningstar Commune, formed in Sonoma County in the mid-1960s
- Morning Star Boys' Ranch, Spokane, Washington
- Morning Star Trust, UK-based, Christian sail training charity
- Morning Star International, former name of Every Nation Churches, an organization of non-denominational churches

== Arts and entertainment ==
=== Fictional characters ===
- Charlie Morningstar, the protagonist of the animated series Hazbin Hotel
  - Lucifer Morningstar (Hazbin Hotel), Charlie's father and Lilith's ex-husband in Hazbin Hotel
  - Lilith Morningstar, Charlie's mother and Lucifer's ex-wife in Hazbin Hotel
- Lucifer (DC Comics) (Lucifer Morningstar), a DC character who primarily appears in The Sandman comic books by Neil Gaiman
  - Lucifer Morningstar (Lucifer), in the TV series Lucifer and an adaptation of the comic book character
    - Candy Morningstar, Lucifer's "ex-wife", with whom he shares no real relationship
    - Rory Morningstar, Lucifer's daughter from the future, who wishes him dead in Lucifer
- Michael Morningstar, in "All That Glitters" (Ben 10: Alien Force)
- Morning Star (comics), a fictional Marvel Comics villain
- Morningstar, a superhero from the Bogatyri comic books
- Morningstar, in the Elementals comic book
- Morning Star, in the Noble Warriors Trilogy of novels by William Nicholson
- Morningstar, from the novel Jack of Shadows by Roger Zelazny
- Eärendil, in The Silmarillion by J. R. R. Tolkien

=== Literature ===
==== News media ====
- Morning Star (British newspaper)
- Former Morning Star (London newspaper)
- The Morning Star (British Columbia newspaper), Canada
- Former The Morning Star (New Hampshire newspaper), US
- Morning Star, established 1867 in Wilmington, North Carolina, US, renamed Star-News in 2003
- Morning Star, established 1888 in Rockford, Illinois U.S., renamed Rockford Register Star in 1979
- Magic City Morning Star, an on-line newspaper, Katahdin, Maine, US

==== Novels ====
- Morning Star (Haggard novel), 1910, by H Rider Haggard
- Morning Star (Raven novel), 1984, by Simon Raven
- Morning Star (Brown novel), 2016, by Pierce Brown
- The Morning Star (novel), 2020, by Karl Ove Knausgård
- Morningstar, 1992, by David Gemmell
- The Morning Star, a 2001–2003 trilogy of novels by Nick Bantock

==== Other literature ====
- The Morning Star (play), 1941, by Emlyn Williams
- The Morning Star, a 1979 book of poems and translations by Kenneth Rexroth
- "Luceafărul" (poem), an 1883 narrative poem sometimes translated as "The Morning Star"

=== Film and television ===
- "Candy Morningstar", Lucifer episode, 2017
- Morning Star (1950 film), a Brazilian drama film
- Morning Star (1959 film), a Soviet ballet film
- Morning Star (1980 film), an Israeli film about a teen aspiring to be a singer
- Morning Star (TV series), US, 1965–1966
- Morning Star (talk show), Philippines 2004–2005
- "Morning Star" (The Walking Dead), an episode of the television series The Walking Dead
- Morning Star, a planned film about Djalu Gurruwiwi
- "The Murder of Lucifer Morningstar", Lucifer episode, 2021

=== Music ===
==== Albums ====
- Morning Star (Entombed album), 2001
- Morning Star (Flunk album), 2004
- Morning Star (Hubert Laws album), 1972
- Morning Star (Spear of Destiny album), 2003
- Morningstar, by the American electronic music band Asmodeus X
- The Morning Star (album), by Daniel Bachman, 2018
- Criminal Intents/Morning Star, EP by Dope Stars Inc., 2009

==== Songs ====
- "Morningstar", by AFI on The Art of Drowning
- "Morning Star", by Amberian Dawn on The Clouds of Northland Thunder
- "Morning Star", by Amorphis on Tuonela
- "Morning Star", by Angra on Temple of Shadows
- "Morningstar", by Baroness on Purple
- "Morning Star", by Cass McCombs on Big Wheel and Others
- Morning Star, a musical work for wind ensemble composed by David Maslanka
- "The Morningstar", by Draconian on The Burning Halo
- "Morning Star, Durbanville", by Fokofpolisiekar on Swanesang
- "Morning Star", by Hank Marvin
- "Morning Star", by Henry Cow on In Praise of Learning
- "Morning Star", by King Woman
- "Morning Star" (Nat King Cole song), 1958
- "Morning Star" (N-Dubz song), 2011
- "Morning Star", by Roger Shah featuring the voice of Moya Brennan
- "Morning Star", by Stiff Gins
- "Morning Star", by Taylor Davis
- "Draconian Trilogy: Morning Star", by Therion on Vovin
- "Morning Star", by Wolves at the Gate on Captors

==== Other uses in music ====
- Morning Star (opera), by Ricky Ian Gordon
- "Morning Star" (carol), an 1836 traditional Moravian carol
- The Morningstars, a band fronted by Sierra Leonean musician S. E. Rogie

=== Other arts ===
- Morning Star, a painting by Alex Janvier

== Other uses ==
- Morning Star (cannabis), a strain
- Morning star (candlestick pattern), in a financial chart
- Morning star (weapon), a spiked mace
- Morning Star flag, of West Papua
- Morning Star exploration program for the planet Venus, whose first mission is Venus Life Finder
- Morningstar Style Box

== See also ==
- The Evening and the Morning Star (1832–1834), the first newspaper of the Latter Day Saint movement
- Evening Star (disambiguation)
- Morgenster (disambiguation)
- Morgenstern (disambiguation)
- Nightstar (disambiguation)
- Rising Star (disambiguation)
