= St. Louis Blues (disambiguation) =

The St. Louis Blues are a professional ice hockey team based in St. Louis, Missouri.

St. Louis Blues or Saint Louis Blues may also refer to:

- "Saint Louis Blues" (song), a blues tune and song by W. C. Handy, published in 1914
- Saint Louis Blues F.C., an Australian rules football team in the United States Australian Football League
- St. Louis Blues (1929 film), a two-reel short directed by Dudley Murphy
- St. Louis Blues (1939 film), a film directed by Raoul Walsh
- St. Louis Blues (1958 film), a feature film
- Saint Louis Blues (2009 film), 2009 French film
- St. Louis Blues (album), a 1958 album by Nat King Cole
- St. Louis blues (music), a type of blues music
- St. Louis Blues, a defunct American football team that played the 1934 season in the American Football League (1934)
- St. Louis Jr. Blues, a Junior A ice hockey team in Affton, Missouri
