= Earendel =

Earendel may refer to:

- Ēarendel, an Anglo-Saxon mythological figure, the Morning Star, or Rising Star, or Dawn
- Eärendel, original spelling of Eärendil, a fictional character from J.R.R. Tolkien's Legendarium
- Earendel (star), a star, announced as the most distant then known individual star in 2022
- "Earendel" (song), a 2015 song by 'Sirenia' off the album The Seventh Life Path

== See also ==
- Song of Eärendil, a poem by J.R.R. Tolkien
- Morning Star (disambiguation)
- Rising Star (disambiguation)
- Dawn (disambiguation)
- Arendelle, a fictional realm where Disney's Frozen films take place
