= Morning Star Lake =

Morning Star Lake may refer to:

- Morning Star Lake (Glacier County, Montana), in Glacier National Park
- Morning Star Lake (Nebraska), a lake in Merrick County
