= Morning Star (Nat King Cole song) =

"Morning Star" is a track sung by Nat King Cole from the 1958 album St. Louis Blues. "Morning Star", taken from the Paramount picture, St. Louis Blues, with new lyrics by Mack David, was based on W. C. Handy's spiritual "Shine Like a Morning Star". The song describes, among other things, a mother's love for her son. The lyrics commence "I asked my mother / Is there a morning star? / I was answered by my mother / Yes, there's a morning star".

Handy's original song, "Shine Like a Morning Star", was also arranged for SATB quartet as a four voice spiritual.
