= Rising Star =

Rising Star or Rising Stars may refer to:

== People and characters ==
- Rising Star, a pseudonym of the DJ Armin van Buuren
- Aurvandil, the Rising Star, or Morning Star; in Germanic mythology

== Books ==
- Rising Stars (comic), a comic book series by J. Michael Straczynski
- Rising Stars of Manga, an English-language comic anthology published by TOKYOPOP from 2002 to 2008
- Rising Star: The Making of Barack Obama, a 2017 biography of Barack Obama by David Garrow
- Rising Stars, a British educational publisher owned by Hodder Education

== Film and TV ==
- Rising Stars (film), a 2010 American teen musical film
- "Rising Star" (Babylon 5), a fourth-season episode of the science fiction television series Babylon 5
- Rising Star (franchise), an international music reality television series in a number of countries
  - Rising Star (France), 2014 French reality show on M6
  - Rising Star Indonesia
  - Rising Star (American TV series), 2014 American reality show on ABC
  - Rising Star (Indian TV series)
- Suraj: The Rising Star, an Indian animated TV series about cricket

== Music ==
- Rising Star (album), a 2009 album by Taegoon
- Brit Award for Rising Star, an award recognizing up and coming talent

== Places ==
- Rising Star, Texas, USA
- Rising Star Academy, an Islamic School in New Jersey, United States
- Rising Star Cave, an archaeological site in the Cradle of Humankind, South Africa
- Rising Starr Middle School, a school in Fayette County, Georgia, United States

== Ships ==
- PS Rising Star, a paddle steamer warship launched in 1818
- Rising Star (ship, 1991), a tugboat operated by the United States Air Force

=== Fictional ships ===
- Rising Star, a fictional starship featured in the original Battlestar Galactica episode "Murder on the Rising Star"

== Sport ==
- AFL Rising Star, an award given to the best young player in the Australian Football League
- AFL Women's Rising Star, an award given to the best young player in the AFL Women's
- Rising Stars F.C., a Nigerian football club
- Rising Stars Challenge, a basketball all-star game
- Rising Stars cricket team, a cricket team based in Zimbabwe

== Others ==
- Rising Star Casino Resort, a casino hotel in Indiana
- Rising Star Games, a video game publishing company

== See also ==
- Catch a Rising Star (disambiguation)
- Rising Star Award (disambiguation)
- Morning Star (disambiguation)
