= Morgenster =

Morgenster ("Morning Star" in the Dutch language) may refer to:

- Morgenster, Aruba, a village on the island of Aruba in the Caribbean
- Morgenster (ship), a Dutch registered sail training ship
- The Morgenster mission station near the town of Masvingo, Zimbabwe
- The Morgenster residential area of Brackenfell in the Western Cape, South Africa

== See also ==
- Morgenstern (disambiguation)
- Morgnshtern
- Morning Star (disambiguation)
