= Morgenstern =

Morgenstern may refer to:

- Morgenstern (surname)
- Morgenstern (band), a music project
- "Morgenstern", song by metal band Rammstein on their 2004 album Reise, Reise
- Morning star (weapon), a spiked mace, also known as a morgenstern
- Morgenstern, a thermonuclear device detonated in the Castle Koon nuclear test

== See also ==
- Morgenster (disambiguation)
- Morgenshtern
- Morgnshtern
- Morning Star (disambiguation)
