= Catch a Rising Star =

Catch a Rising Star may refer to:

- Catch a Rising Star (comedy clubs), a chain of comedy clubs
- Catch a Rising Star (TV series), a Canadian variety television series
- Catch a Rising Star (album), a 1963 album by John Gary
