= Morning Star (1813 ship) =

Ship wrecked in 1814 near Quoin Island, Queensland, Australia

History

United Kingdom
- Name: Morning Star
- Namesake: Morning Star
- Owner: Lackersteen & Co.
- Builder: J.Scott & Co., Fort Gloster, Calcutta
- Launched: 26 August 1813
- Fate: Wrecked July 1814

General characteristics
- Tons burthen: 135, or 140 (bm)
- Sail plan: Brig

Morning Star was launched at Calcutta, India, in 1813. She was wrecked on a coral reef south of Forbes Island, north Queensland in July 1814.

Morning Star arrived at Port Jackson on 10 June 1814, from Bengal carrying merchandise. She left for Bengal on 3 July.

Loss: On 2 or 3 July 1814, whilst on her way from Sydney to Batavia, she was totally wrecked at 12.4305°S 143.4217°E off the north Queensland coast. On 30 September 1814, as the ship Eliza was passing Booby Island she sighted a white flag flying on the island. Eliza sent a boat to investigate and found five survivors from Morning Star that were stranded there. The survivors stated that on 25 September, Captain Robert Smart and nine other crew had left the Island for Timor in the longboat. There is no record of their arrival in Timor. Excluding the party with Smart and the five rescued by Eliza, it appears that 22 crew drowned in the wreck of Morning Star.

The crew's usage of Booby Island as a refuge was the first recorded instance of such.

Lloyd's List (LL) erroneously reported on 9 May 1815, that Morning Star, Smart, master, had wrecked on Booby Island in September while sailing from Port Jackson to Batavia. It also reported that the crew had been saved.

On 7 September 1818, the ships Claudine and Mary rescued one of the ship's crew, an Indian lascar named Shaik Jamaul, from Murray Island (Mer), in northeast Torres Strait, where he had been living for four years.

Bateson states that the owners of the ship were a Calcutta firm, Lackersteen (or Lackerstren) & Co.
