= When the Roses Come Again =

Studio album by Daniel Bachman
- Released: November 17, 2023
- Length: 42:45
- Label: Three Lobed
- Producer: Daniel Bachman

Daniel Bachman chronology
Almanac Behind (2022)	When the Roses Come Again (2023)

When the Roses Come Again is a studio album by American musician Daniel Bachman, released on November 17, 2023, through Three Lobed Recordings. The track titles form a poem with rhyming lines. It received acclaim from critics.

== Recording ==
The album was recorded by Bachman on a laptop in a cabin near the Shenandoah National Park in Virginia, where Bachman was working as an assistant carpenter. It was assembled from a week's worth of improvisational recordings utilizing homemade instruments.

== Critical reception ==
Professional ratings
Aggregate scores
Source	Rating
Metacritic	83/100
Review scores
Source	Rating
Mojo	4/5 stars
Pitchfork	7.9/10
Uncut	8/10
The Wire	4/5 stars

When the Roses Come Again received a score of 83 out of 100 on review aggregator Metacritic based on six critics' reviews, indicating "universal acclaim". Uncut stated that the album "feels like something impossibly ancient, sent back to us from some distant future", while Mojo described it as "progressive conceptual art, underpinned with profound personal resonances". The Wire felt that "where Vernon's album For Emma, Forever Ago registers like a melancholic exorcism of listless youth and failed relationships, Bachman does not engage in that kind of soul searching, though he elicits a similarly potent emotional response".

Pitchfork's Philip Sherburne found it to be "less turbulent" than Bachman's recent work as his "focus has returned to the sounds of his guitar and banjo, which weave, snakelike, through shimmering fields of harmonium and electronic squeal". Sherburne remarked that "there are no real songs to speak of—just scenes, which flow together as seamlessly as fields glimpsed from the window of a moving train. The album is clearly meant to be experienced as a single piece of music, and the pacing is immaculate". Jon Buckland of The Quietus observed that Bachman's "bucolic folk-fingering [...] entwines with (more) modern technology. There's an oscillator-drawn drone coursing throughout the album, linking tracks together like an aural paste" and the album's use of "archaic electronics [...] juxtaposed with the permeating air of folk-y tranquility" seems to imply "yearning for a simpler age".

== Track listing ==
When the Roses Come Again track listing
No.	Title	Length
1.	"Neath the Shadow, Down the Meadow"	0:37
2.	"Leaves Lying on Each Side"	2:41
3.	"By the River, Flowers Shiver (Fading Dying in Their Pride)"	2:57
4.	"Someone Straying, Long Delaying"	3:45
5.	"Sad the Parting Down the Lane"	1:25
6.	"I Must Leave You Someone's Saying"	4:14
7.	"Till the Roses Come Again"	3:15
8.	"As I Wander, I Will Ponder (On a Happy by and By)"	2:48
9.	"On a Summer Over Yonder (With Joy to You and I)"	3:25
10.	"Sunshine Over Clover Blossom on the Meadow Wide"	2:43
11.	"Summer's Fingers Sweetly Linger (Everywhere on Every Side)"	4:21
12.	"Someone's Roaming in the Gloaming"	2:26
13.	"Happy Hearts That Feel No Pain"	2:38
14.	"All Their Sadness Turned to Gladness"	1:21
15.	"Now the Roses Come Again"	4:09
Total length:		42:45
