= Morgenstern (surname) =

Morgenstern (German: [ˈmɔʁɡn̩ˌʃtɛʁn]) is a German surname that is also used in Scandinavia and is common among Ashkenazi Jews. It means "morning star" and is sometimes anglicized as Morningstar.

== Notable people ==
- Alisher Morgenshtern (born 1998), Russian rapper known as Morgenshtern
- Barbara Morgenstern (born 1971), German musician
- Christian Morgenstern (1871–1914), German poet
- Christian Ernst Bernhard Morgenstern (1805–1867), German landscape painter
- Dan Morgenstern (1929–2024), German-American music critic, former editor of Down Beat magazine, academician at Rutgers University
- Erin Morgenstern (born 1978), American author
- Hal Morgenstern (born 1946), American epidemiologist
- Ignace Morgenstern (1900–1961), Hungarian-born French film producer
- Jamie Morgenstern, American computer scientist
- Janusz Morgenstern (1922–2011), Polish film director and producer
- Joe Morgenstern (born 1932, American film critic
- Johann Karl Simon Morgenstern (1770–1852), the German philologist who coined the term Bildungsroman
- Julian Morgenstern (1881–1976), American rabbi and Hebrew Union College professor and president
- Karina Morgenstern (born 1968), German physicist
- Maia Morgenstern (born 1962), Romanian film and stage actress
- Mark Morgenstern, Canadian filmmaker
- Matthew Morgenstern (born 1962), Israeli professor
- Norbert Morgenstern (born 1935), Canadian geotechnical engineer
- Oskar Morgenstern (1902–1977), German-born economist and founder of the field of game theory
- Ralph Morgenstern (born 1956), German actor in theatre, TV and film
- Soma Morgenstern (1890–1976), Jewish-Austrian writer and journalist
- Stephanie Morgenstern (born 1965), Canadian actress and screenwriter
- Thomas Morgenstern (born 1986), Austrian ski jumper
- Yitzchak Meir Morgenstern (born 1966), Israeli Hasidic rabbi and kabbalist

== Fiction ==
- David Morgenstern, a fictional emergency department physician portrayed by William H. Macy on the TV series ER
- S. Morgenstern, fictional author of William Goldman's The Princess Bride
- Valentine Morgenstern and Sebastian Morgenstern, the main antagonists in Mortal Instruments book series
- Clary Fray, the main protagonist of the Mortal Instruments book series, has the paternal surname of Morgenstern
- Rhoda Morgenstern, portrayed by Valerie Harper, a character on the television sitcom The Mary Tyler Moore Show and subsequent spin-off Rhoda
- Marjorie Morningstar (novel), 1955 novel by Herman Wouk, which introduced the character Marjorie Morgenstern
- Marjorie Morningstar (film) (1958), title character portrayed by Natalie Wood
- Ava Morgenstern, portrayed by Ava Kolker, a character in Disney's children show Girl Meets World
