= Claudine (1811 ship) =

British sailing ship, scrapped 1849

History

United Kingdom
- Name: Claudine
- Owner: Joseph L Heathorn
- Builder: Anthony Blackmore, or M. Smith
- Launched: 31 October 1811
- Fate: Broken up in 1849

General characteristics
- Tons burthen: 428, or 436, or 452 (bm)
- Propulsion: Sail

Claudine was launched at Calcutta in 1811. She made two voyages transporting convicts, one to Van Diemen's Land in 1821 and one to New South Wales in 1829. In between, she made one voyage under charter to the British East India Company. Her captain deliberately grounded her in November 1840 to survive a storm, but she was able to return to service. She was broken up in 1849.

== Career ==
Claudine initially traded as a country ship and then to India under a license from the East India Company. Later she became a free trader.

In 1814 Claudine was admitted to the Registry of Great Britain.

On 2 November 1815 Claudine, Welch, master, and Juliana, Horblow, master, sailed from Batavia. They were at Anjer Roads on 10 November, with Claudine having run on a coral reef the day after leaving Batavia. The two vessels narrowly escaped being wrecked on "Pulo Bahec", but escaped with minimal loss. They then separated after transiting the Sunda Strait. Claudine put into the Cape on 24 December, leaving on the 26th. She rejoined Juliana on 7 January 1816, and touched St Helena the next day; the two vessels finally parted at Ascension Island. On 9 February Claudine ran into bad weather 35 leagues off St Michael's Mount. At 8:43 pm on 10 February Claudine experienced an earthquake that lasted four or five seconds; the crew had to jettison some cargo to stay afloat in the subsequent waves. Claudine and Juliana arrived in the Downs shortly thereafter. Claudine sailed on to Antwerp, where she grounded at Lillo. (Note: Lillo is a former Belgian town that disappeared due to the expansion of the Port of Antwerp.) She was gotten off without major damage.

Claudine's owners applied for a licence from the East India Company on 29 March 1816, and received it the same day.

On 12 April 1817 Claudine struck a reef near Palau Mansalar (1°36′12″N 98°30′39″E), off the west coast of Sumatra. Then in September 1818, Claudine pioneered the northern route through the Torres Strait as she sailed from Port Jackson to Batavia. During this voyage, in company with the ship Mary, a survivor from the 1814 wreck of the Morning Star was rescued from Murray Island (Mer), northeast Torres Strait on 7 September.

=== Van Diemen's Land and Port Jackson ===
Claudine made a trading voyage in 1820 from London to Hobart and then Sydney. She sailed from Sydney on 10 May 1820 under the command of Captain John Welsh. He discovered Claudine's Reef in the Coral Sea (21°19′S 159°4′E). On 16 May he navigated Elizabeth's Reef (30°5′S 159°0′E). He then sailed past Murray Island, Queensland, in the Torres Strait on the way to Batavia. From Batavia she returned to England.

=== Convict voyage to Van Diemen's Land (1821) ===
Captain John Crabtree sailed Claudine on 24 August 1821 from Woolwich. She sailed via Tenerife and Rio de Janeiro to Hobart Town, arriving on 15 December. She had embarked 160 convicts, one of whom died on the voyage.

=== East India Company voyage (1824–1825) ===
Captain George Nichols sailed from the Downs on 16 June 1824, bound for Bengal. Claudine arrived at Calcutta on 23 October. Homeward bound, she was at Saugor on 2 January 1825. She reached Madras on 26 January and St Helena on 12 April. She arrived at East India Dock on 5 June.

Her owners registered Claudine in London on 18 January 1826.

At the end of July 1826 Claudine, Christie, master, was at Bengal, where Bengal Merchant ran into her, carrying away Claudine's bowsprit and inflicting other damage.

=== Convict voyage to Sydney (1829) ===
Captain William Heathorn sailed Claudine from London on 24 August 1829, and she arrived at Sydney on 6 December. Captain Patterson and 26 rank-and-file of the 63rd Regiment of Foot provided the guard. She embarked 180 convicts, two of whom died on the voyage. Claudine then sailed to Madras on 31 December.

== Later career and fate ==
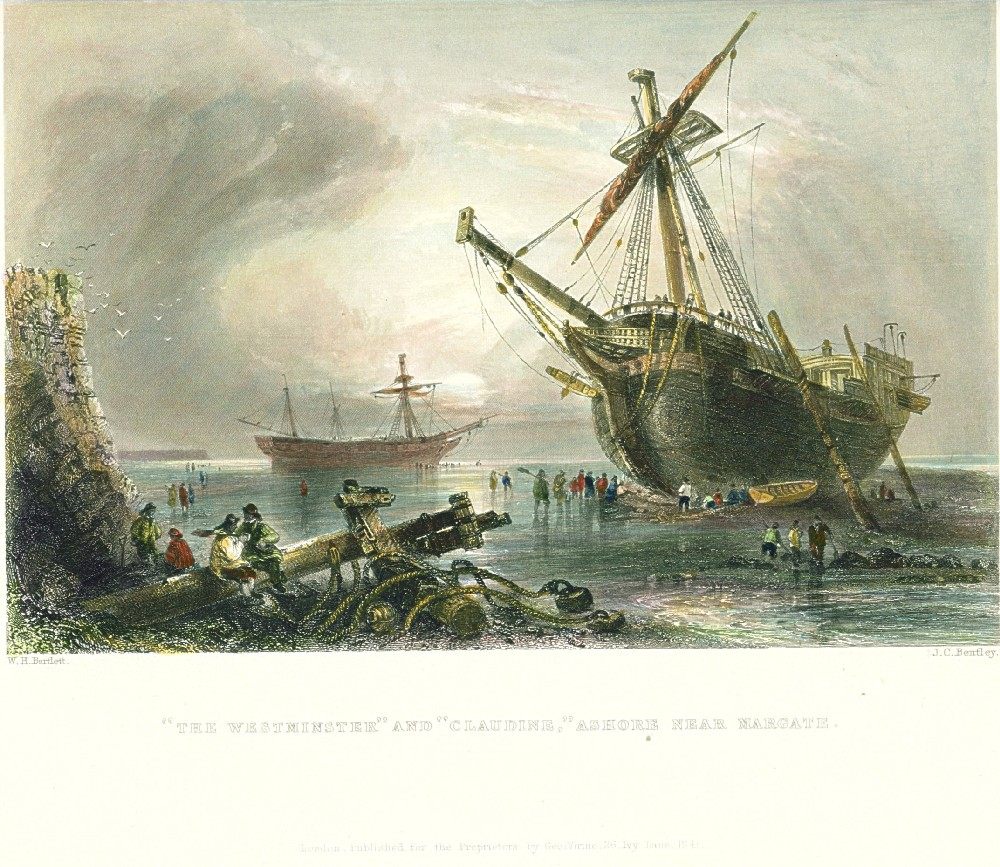
Claudine and Westminster ashore near Margate; Claudine is in the foreground. Artist:William Henry Bartlett

A storm on 21–22 November 1840 led Captain Brewer to beach Claudine ashore near Ramsgate. The captain of Westminster did likewise. The two vessels were unloaded of their cargo and then refloated some weeks later. Both returned to service after repairs. Claudine was repaired in 1840 and Lloyd's Register notes that damage was repaired and references "Margate". At the time of the grounding her owner was still Heathorne. Her trade in 1841 was listed as London−Madras, changing to London—China.

In 1842 Claudine was sold to Mangles. At the time she was trading between London and China.

In 1849 Claudine's master was Black, her owner Kenrick, and her trade London—Madras. Claudine was broken up in 1849. (Note: Hackman conflates the 1840 grounding with being broken up in 1849.) Lloyd's Register for 1850 no longer lists her.
