= Bengal Merchant (1812 ship) =

Sailing ship built in Bengal in 1812

History

United Kingdom
- Name: Bengal Merchant
- Owner: Sedgewicke & Hearne (1812-1832); John Groves (1832-1834); Joseph Somes (1834-1839); Haviside & Company (1839-1856)
- Builder: Anthony Blackmore, Howrah, Bengal
- Launched: 26 May 1812
- Fate: Hulked in 1856

General characteristics
- Tons burthen: 463, or 464, or 477, or 478, or 503 (bm)
- Propulsion: Sail
- Armament: 14 × 18&12-pounder carronades
- Notes: Teak-built

Bengal Merchant was a sailing ship built of teak in Bengal and launched there on 26 May 1812. Between 1812 and 1829, Bengal Merchant was in private trade as a licensed ship. She served the East India Company (EIC) in 1813, and from 1830 till 1834. She also transported convicts from Britain to Australia four times before she was hulked in 1856.

== Career ==
=== First voyage for the EIC (1813–14) ===
Captain Thomas Ross sailed from Calcutta on 21 May 1813. Bengal Merchant was at Saugor on 26 July, Mauritius on 21 September, and the Cape on 17 November. She reached the Downs on 3 March 1814.

Bengal Merchant, Captain Peter Gordon, in November stopped at Tristan da Cunha for several days. There Gordon met Tommaso Corri (known as Thomas Currie), who was the only survivor (of four men) of the American Jonathan Lambert's settlement on Tristan. In May 1815, Gordon sent a letter, per Currie's request, to the government of the British colony at the Cape of Good Hope Colony, asking for British aid and protection. Eventually Britain annexed the island in 1816, establishing a small garrison there.

Bengal Merchant was admitted to the Registry of Great Britain in 1814. She entered Lloyd's Register (LR), in 1814.

Year	Master	Owner	Trade	Source
1814	T.Ross	Davidson	London–India	LR

A passenger travelling from Batavia to Dover in 1815, on Bengal Merchant remarked on her master's insistence on her crew attending divine service on Sunday. The passenger thought it ridiculous to read prayers in English to a crew of lascars, Chinese, and Malays who did not understand the language. On 17 January 1816, Bengal Merchant was at Deal where a gale caught her, causing her to break her anchor.

=== Spanish ownership ===
Between 1816 and 1818, Bengal Merchant was in Spanish hands. After her return to British ownership and Calcutta registry, she became a Free Trader.

In early 1820, Bengal Merchant was at Canton. She had 300 chests of opium.

Between September 1821 and December 1827, Bengal Merchant was Captained by Alexander Brown of Farnham in Surrey, on six occasions. In February 1822, the Times Newspaper shipping News stated; "For Bengal, to sail from Portsmouth, the Teak ship Bengal Merchant of 500 tons, Commander Alexander Brown, carries a Surgeon, superior accommodation, and equal in every respect to the East India Company's regular ships". It apparently didn't sail until June 1822, the African court Calendar reported; Hon Company's Chartered Ship Bengal Merchant, Alexander Brown, Calcutta and Madras, London, Sugar and Saltpetre, 20th June. On other occasions, Captain Brown Chartered the Ship through Smith Inglis and Co of Mansion House.

At the end of July 1826, Bengal Merchant was at Bengal. There she ran into Claudine, carrying away Claudine's bowsprit and inflicting other damage. On this occasion it is likely H Hutchinson was Captain. The Bombay Gazette reported Bengal Merchant arrived in Calcutta on 8 August.

=== First convict voyage (1828) ===
Bengal Merchant sailed from Plymouth on 25 March 1828, under the command of Alex Duthie, and arrived at Hobart Town on 10 August 1828. She had embarked 172 male convicts, four of whom died on the voyage.

=== Second voyage for the EIC (1830–31) ===
Captain Gilson Reeves Fox and Bengal Merchant left Portsmouth on 5 June 1830. They reached the Cape on 24 August, Madras on 19 October, and Calcutta on 1 December. For the return journey, they reached St Helena on 1 June 1831, and the Downs on 6 August.

=== Third voyage for the EIC (1833–34) ===
In 1832, Bengal Merchant was sold to John Groves.

Captain John Campbell left the Downs on 25 July 1833, and reached Calcutta on 9 December. On the return voyage Bengal Merchant passed Saugor on 28 January 1834. She reached St Helena on 8 April, and Blackwall, London, on 8 June.

=== Second convict voyage (1834) ===
In 1834, she was sold to Joseph Somes.

Under the command of William Campbell, Bengal Merchant sailed from London on 1 October 1834, and arrived at Port Jackson on 30 January 1835. She had embarked 270 male convicts, three of whom died on the voyage.

=== Third convict voyage (1836) ===
Again under the command of William Campbell, she sailed from Downs on 8 August 1836, and arrived at Port Jackson on 9 December. She had embarked 270 male convicts, one of whom died on the voyage.

=== Fourth convict voyage (1838) ===
Bengal Merchant left Sheerness on 28 March 1838, under the command of William Campbell, and arrived at Port Jackson on 21 July 1838. She had embarked 270 male convicts; three male convicts died on the voyage.

=== Passenger transport ===
In 1839, Bengal Merchant was sold to Haviside & Co., London. Captain John Hemery sailed from Glasgow on 30 October 1839, with 160 passengers and arrived at Port Nicholson (Wellington Harbour), New Zealand, on 20 February 1840. The New Zealand Company had chartered her and she was the first vessel to bring Scottish emigrants to New Zealand. After their arrival, the steerage passengers submitted a letter of complaint about the food they had received.

== Fate ==
Bengal Merchant was hulked in 1856.
