= Platte River =

River in Nebraska, United States

Platte River Nebraska River, Shallow River, Plato/Chato (spa), Meneo'hé'e (chy), Ñíbraxge (iow), Pȟaŋkéska Wakpá (lkt), Ní Btháska (oma), Kíckatus (paw)
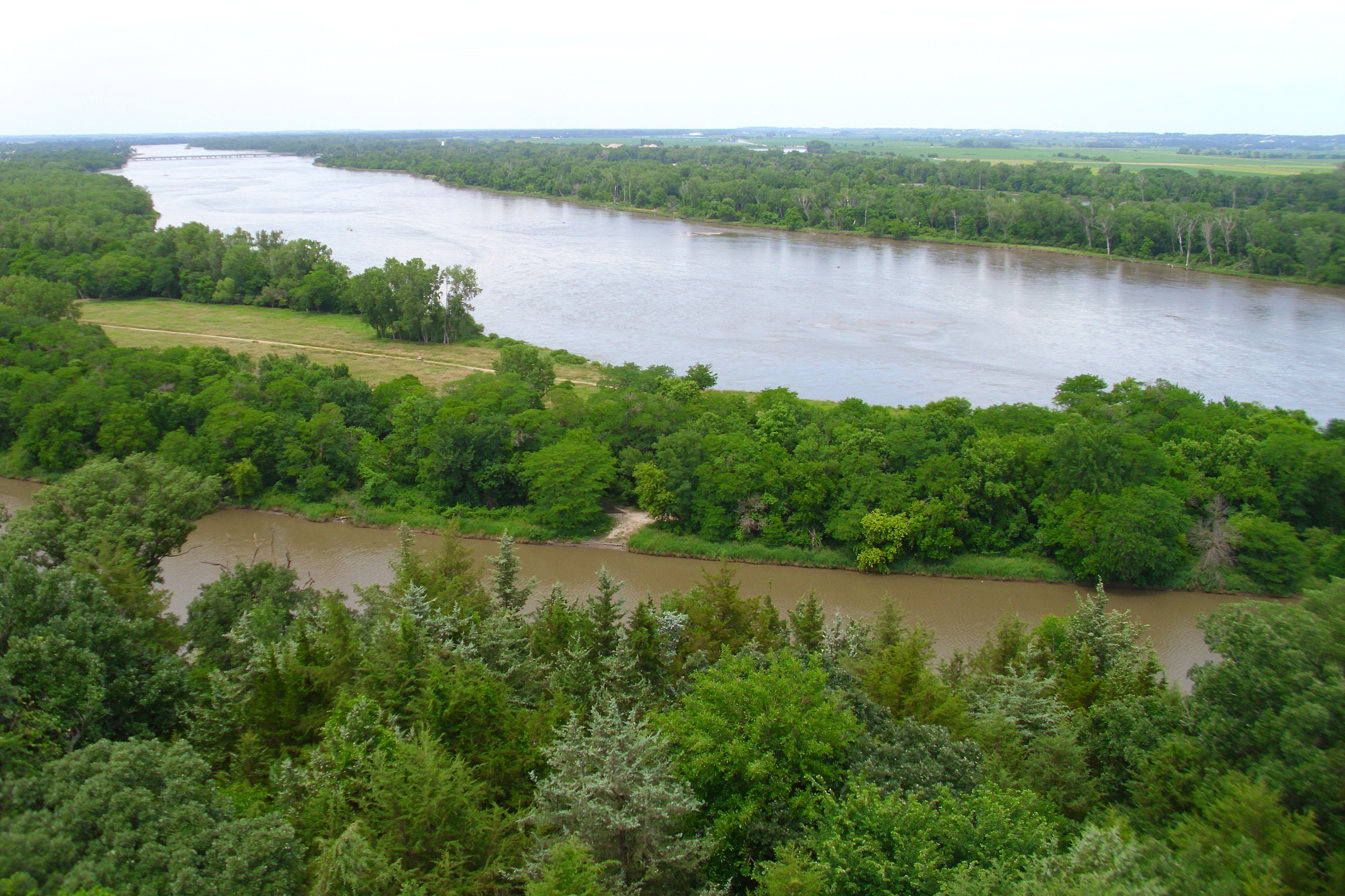
- Platte River at Mahoney State Park

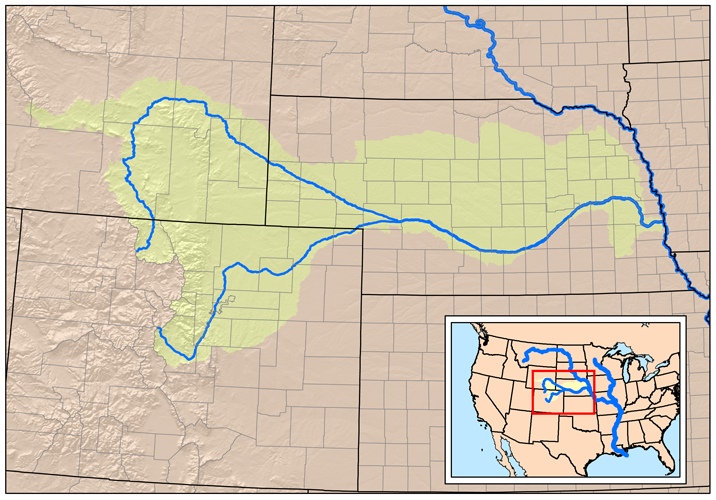
- Map showing the Platte River watershed, including the North Platte and South Platte tributaries
- Etymology: French ("flat river") and Chiwere ("flat water")

Location
- Country: United States
- State: Nebraska
- Region: Great Plains
- Cities: North Platte, Kearney, Grand Island, Fremont, Omaha

Physical characteristics
- Source: North Platte River
  - location: Confluence of Grizzly Creek and Little Grizzly Creek, Jackson County, Colorado
  - coordinates: 40°38′23″N 106°24′19″W
  - length: 716 mi (1,152 km)
  - elevation: 8,050 ft (2,450 m)
- 2nd source: South Platte River
  - location: Confluence of Middle Fork and South Fork South Platte Rivers, Park County, Colorado
  - coordinates: 39°00′40″N 105°44′25″W
  - length: 439 mi (707 km)
  - elevation: 8,785 ft (2,678 m)
- Source confluence
  - location: Near North Platte, Lincoln County, Nebraska
  - coordinates: 41°06′50″N 100°40′33″W
  - elevation: 2,762 ft (842 m)
- Mouth: Missouri River
  - location: Cass / Sarpy counties, at Plattsmouth, Nebraska
  - coordinates: 41°03′14″N 95°52′53″W
  - elevation: 942 ft (287 m)
- Length: 310 mi (500 km), West-east
- Basin size: 84,910 sq mi (219,900 km^{2})
- Discharge
  - location: Louisville, 10 miles (16 km) above the mouth
  - average: 7,037 cu ft/s (199.3 m^{3}/s)
  - minimum: 131 cu ft/s (3.7 m^{3}/s)
  - maximum: 160,000 cu ft/s (4,500 m^{3}/s)

Basin features
- River system: Missouri River basin
- Tributaries
  - left: North Platte River, Loup River, Elkhorn River
  - right: South Platte River

The Platte River (/plæt/) is a major river in the U.S. state of Nebraska. It is about 310 mi (500 km) long; measured to its farthest source via its tributary, the North Platte River, it flows for over 1,050 miles (1,690 km). The Platte River is a tributary of the Missouri River, which itself is a tributary of the Mississippi River, which flows to the Gulf of Mexico. The Platte over most of its length is a broad, shallow, meandering stream with a sandy bottom and many islands—a braided stream.

The Platte is one of the most significant tributary systems in the watershed of the Missouri, draining a large portion of the central Great Plains in Nebraska and the eastern Rocky Mountains in Colorado and Wyoming. The river valley played an important role in the westward expansion of the United States, providing the route for several major emigrant trails, including the Oregon, California, Mormon, and Bozeman trails. The first Europeans to see the Platte were French explorers and fur trappers about 1714; they first called it the Nebraskier (Nebraska), a transliteration of the name given by the Otoe people, meaning "flat water". This expression is very close to the French phrase "rivière platte" ("flat river"), which is likely the origin of the name "Platte River".

== Geography ==
=== Headwaters ===
The Platte River is formed in western Nebraska east of the city of North Platte, Nebraska by the confluence of the North Platte and the South Platte Rivers, which both arise from snowmelt in the eastern Rockies east of the Continental Divide.

In central northern Colorado is the North Park valley, ringed by mountains over 12,000 feet (3,700 m) high; this is where the North Platte River originates. The head of the North Platte River is essentially all of Jackson County; its boundaries are the continental divide on the west and south and the mountain drainage peaks on the east—the north boundary is the state of Wyoming. The nearest Colorado town is Walden, the county seat. The rugged Rocky Mountains Continental Divide surrounding Jackson County has at least twelve peaks over 11,000 feet (3,400 m) in height. From Jackson County, the North Platte flows north about 200 miles (320 km) out of the Routt National Forest and North Park near what is now Walden to Casper, Wyoming. Shortly after passing Casper, the North Platte turns to the east-southeast and flows about 350 miles (560 km) to the city of North Platte, Nebraska. In Colorado and Wyoming, the North Platte is narrower and much swifter flowing than it is in Nebraska, where it becomes a slow-flowing, shallow braided stream.

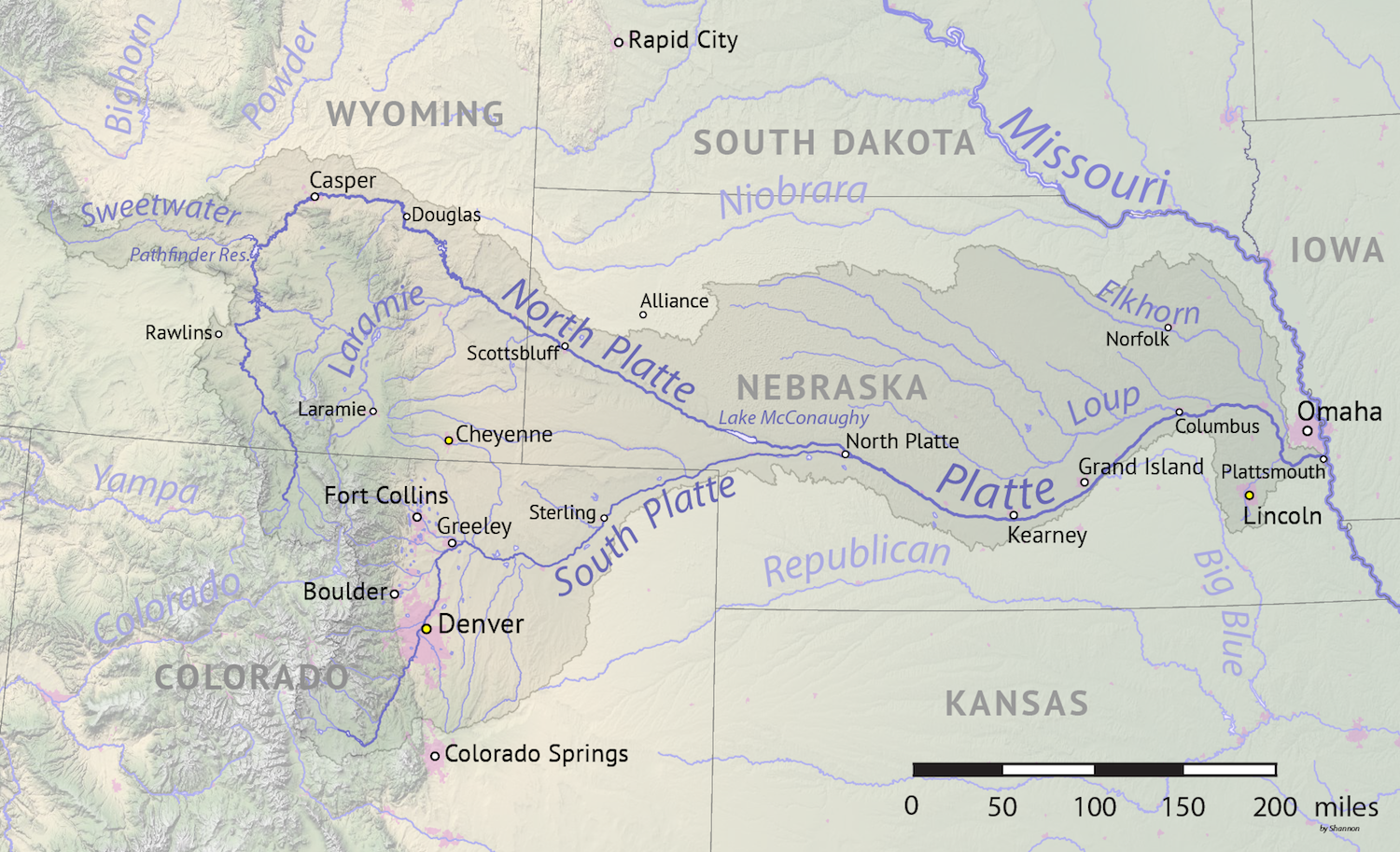
Platte River watershed with tributaries

The North Platte River has been dammed about eight times for water storage and irrigation purposes in Wyoming and Nebraska as it flows to its confluence with the South Platte River. The upper reaches of the river in the Rockies in Colorado and Wyoming are popular for recreation, rafting, lure, and fly fishing for rainbow, brown, cutthroat trout, and other sport fish. In western Nebraska, the banks and riverbed of the North Platte provide a green oasis amid an otherwise semi-arid region of North America. Today, by the time the North Platte reaches Paxton, Nebraska, it is much smaller due to the extensive water taken from it for irrigation. Historically, the North Platte River was up to a mile wide (1.6 km) in many places, as evidenced by the old streambed and historic written records.

The South Platte River drainage includes about 28,000 square miles (73,000 km^{2}) in the north east corner of Colorado, parts of southeastern Wyoming in the vicinity of the city of Cheyenne and a small part of the southwest corner of Nebraska. The South Platte drains a large part of the Front Range mountains east of the continental divide. The part of the river labeled the South Platte is formed in Park County, Colorado, located southwest of Denver, in the South Park grassland basin and mountains east of the continental divide. It is formed by the confluence of the South Fork South Platte River and Middle Fork South Platte River, approximately 15 miles (24 km) southeast of Fairplay, Colorado. After the South and Middle forks join, the South Platte flows east-southeast till it exits Elevenmile Reservoir; it turns almost ninety degrees to skirt the west side of Pikes Peak and flows roughly east-northeast about 100 miles (160 km) through Denver and on to Greeley, Colorado. From Greeley, the South Platte turns east and flows about 200 miles (320 km) to its confluence with the North Platte River near the city of North Platte, Nebraska.

The South Platte River has been dammed about 20 times for water storage, drinking water, and irrigation purposes in Colorado as it flows to its confluence with the North Platte River. The total number of dams in the South Platte drainage may exceed 1,000, as nearly all major streams have at least one dam. The South Platte River serves as the principal source of water for arid eastern Colorado. The South Platte River valley provided a major emigration path to Denver. The wagon trails followed the south side of the Platte/North Platte River. Wagon trains were ferried or waded across the swampy-bottomed South Platte River in low-water years in several places to stay on the south side of the North Platte River, where the trails were located. Miners who later went on to Denver followed the South Platte River trail into Colorado.

=== Main stem ===
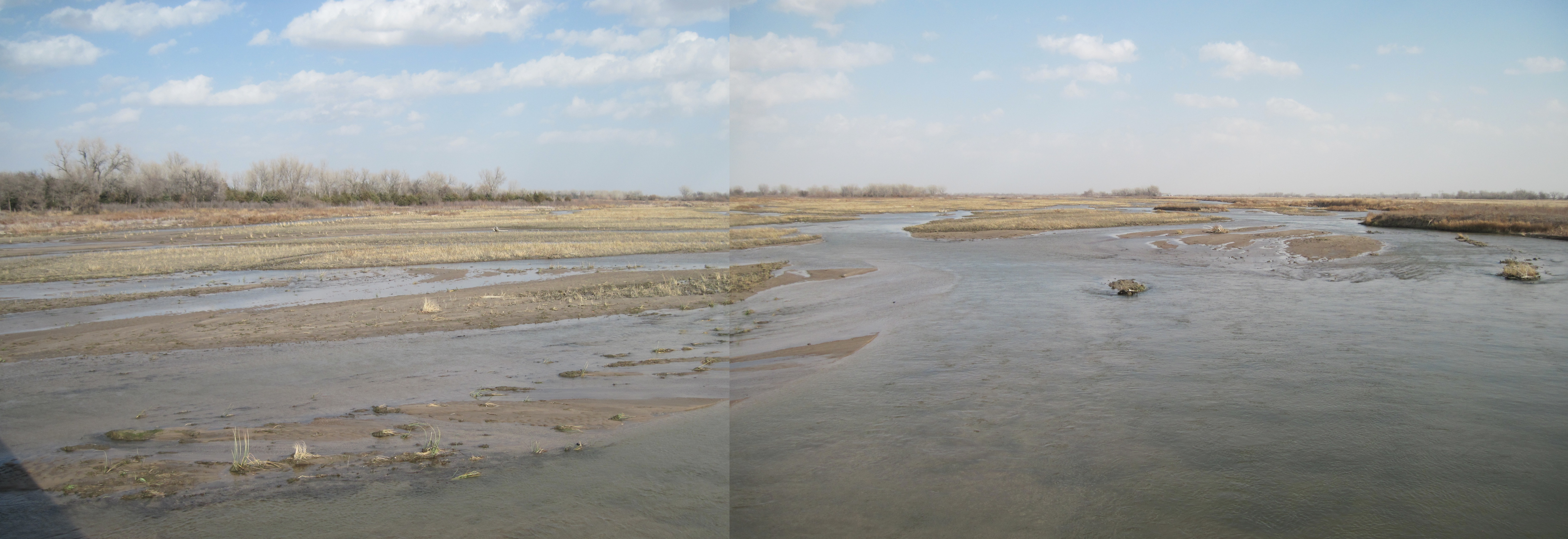
Platte River near Ft. Kearny State Historical Site in Central Nebraska

After the North Platte and the South Platte rivers join to form the Platte River, over most of its length, it is a sandy, broad, shallow, braided river. Its many shallow channels, islands, and ever-changing sandbars made navigation difficult; it was never used as a major water transportation route. The Platte flows in a large arc, east-southeast to near Fort Kearny and then east-northeast, across Nebraska south of Grand Island and on to Columbus. The Platte River is joined from the north by the about 70-mile-long (110 km) Loup River about 2 miles (3 km) southeast of Columbus. During pioneer days, a Loup River ferry crossed the river. From Columbus, the Platte flows almost due east about 50 miles (80 km) past North Bend and then on to Fremont.

Near Fremont, the Platte bends south and then east around the location of Omaha in a large "L" turn. Near Fremont, the Platte turns sharply and flows south-southeast about 10 miles (16 km) to about Waterloo, Nebraska—located about 20 miles (32 km) west of Omaha. Near Waterloo, the Platte turns even more and heads almost due south for about 10 miles (16 km). About 30 miles (48 km) east-southeast of Waterloo and about 30 miles (48 km) from the Platte's confluence with the Missouri River, the Platte is joined from the north by the Elkhorn River. The Elkhorn, a 290-mile-long (470 km) river, originates in the eastern Sandhills of Nebraska and is one of the largest tributaries of the Platte River. The Elkhorn joins the Platte on its south-bound path just southwest of Omaha, approximately 1 mile (2 km) south and 3 miles (5 km) west of Gretna. The pioneers leaving from near Omaha (established 1854) or Council Bluffs, Iowa (established 1846) used the Mormon Trail north of the Platte River and had to ferry across the Elkhorn. After the Union Pacific railroad was constructed west from Omaha in 1866, it had to build a major bridge across the Elkhorn. After the confluence of the Elkhorn and the Platte River, the Platte continues southward, about 7 miles (11 km) before it turns sharply and heads almost due East for about 20 miles (32 km) before its confluence with the Missouri River. Sarpy County is shaped like a crescent, being bounded on the east by the Missouri River, on the south and west by the Platte, and on the north by Douglas County, which contains Omaha. The Platte-Missouri River confluence is about 10 miles (16 km) south of Omaha.

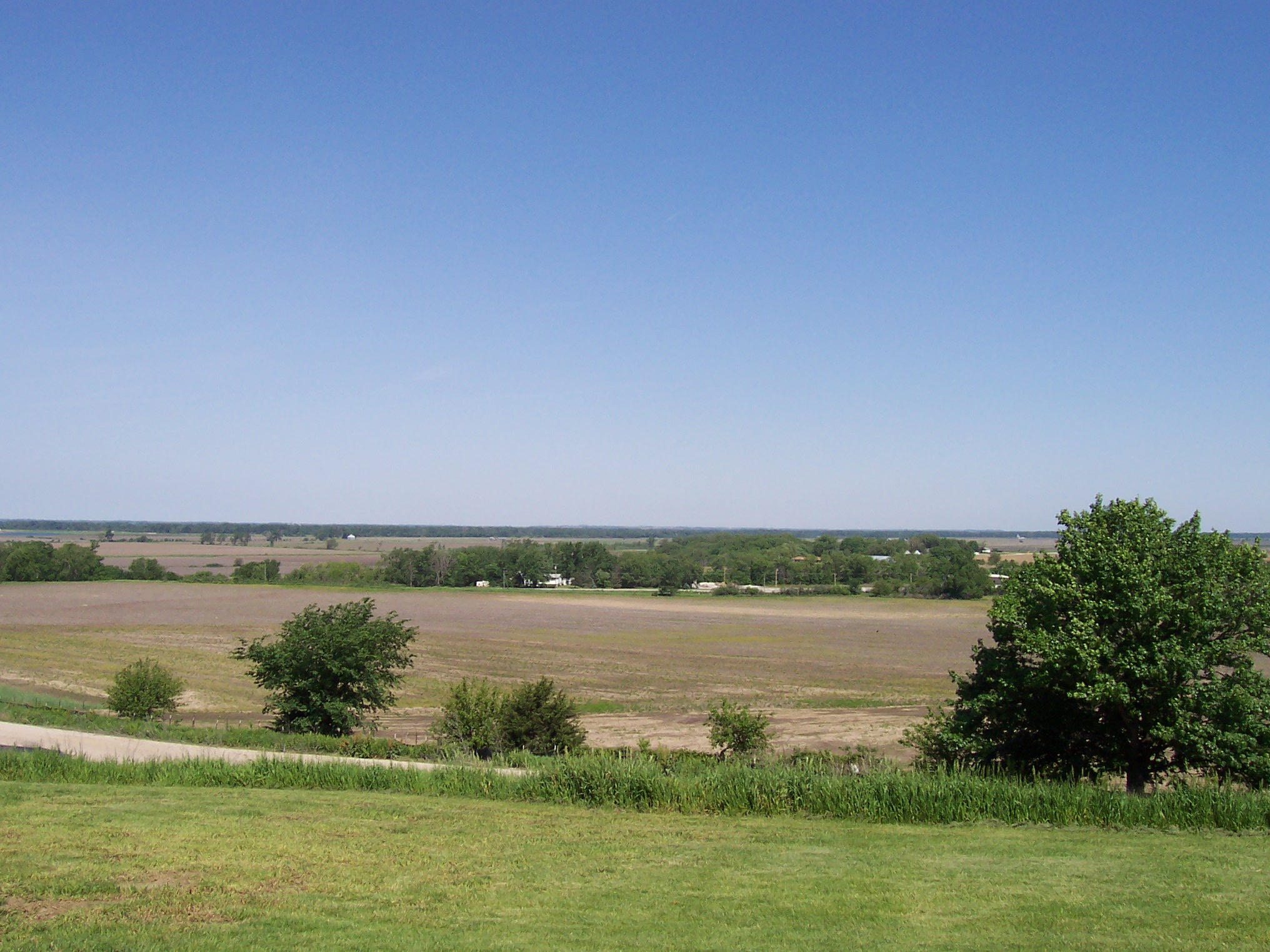
Platte River valley west of Omaha, Nebraska

Including the North Platte River, the Platte River stretches over 850 miles (1,400 km), with a drainage basin of about 90,000 square miles (230,000 km^{2}). The mean annual flow is estimated at 3,240 cu ft/s (92 m^{3}/s). The Platte drains one of the most arid areas of the Great Plains with a flow that is considerably lower than rivers of comparable length in North America. For much of its length, it is a classic wide, muddy and shallow braided stream that, in the lower reaches, flows in a floodplain bordered by bluffs. During pioneer days, the common humorous description was that the Platte was "a mile wide at the mouth, but only six inches deep." 49ers said it was "too thick to drink, too thin to plow". In western Nebraska, the banks and riverbed of the Platte provide a green oasis amid an otherwise semi-arid region of North America. The central Platte River valley is an important stopover for migratory water birds, such as the whooping crane and sandhill crane, in their yearly traversal of the Central Flyway. Fossil evidence in the Platte River valley indicates this crane stopover has been active for over 10 million years.

Since the mid-20th century, this river has shrunk significantly. This size reduction is attributed in part to its waters being used for irrigation, and to a much greater extent to the waters diverted and used by Colorado's growing population, which has outstripped the groundwater's ability to sustain it.

== History ==
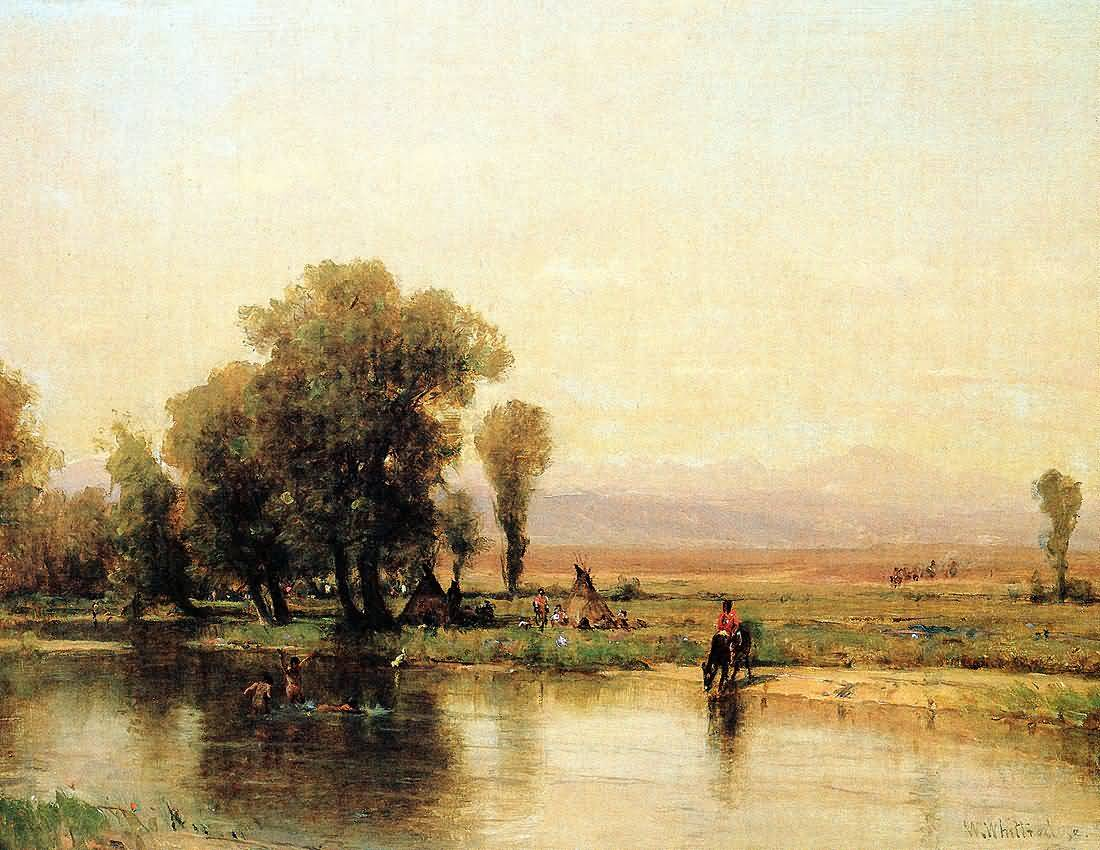
Encampment Along The Platte by Worthington Whittredge

Varying cultures of indigenous peoples lived intermittently along the Platte for thousands of years before European exploration. Historical tribes claimed various territories in the region. The Indian tribes typically visited different areas in different seasons, following the bison herds during hunting seasons. The introduction of horses, which had escaped from early Spanish explorers in the 1540s, dramatically changed life in the Great Plains. Indian tribes could more easily follow the buffalo herds as they migrated from north to south and back. Before 1870, herds of several hundred thousand bison (buffalo) periodically migrated across the Platte in following seasonal grazing. The animals often waded or swam across the Platte. The first known European to see the Platte was the French explorer Étienne de Veniard, Sieur de Bourgmont, in 1714, who named it the Nebraskier, after its Oto name, meaning "flat water". The French later applied the French word plate (meaning flat, and pronounced plat, or platte) to the river.

Occupied by various Indian tribes for part of each year, the Platte River territory was claimed by both Spanish and French explorers who were trying to rule the Great Plains. Spain had claimed all of the Great Plains after Coronado's 1541–42 expedition. Jose Naranjo, an African-Hopi who served as a Spanish scout and explorer in the Southwest, was a war captain of the Spanish Indian auxiliaries. By 1714 (the same year the French explorers reached the Platte), he and a small exploration group from the south had reportedly already reached the Platte three times. He later guided the 1720 Villasur expedition to the area in a Spanish effort to stop French expansion onto the Great Plains. Naranjo and Villasur's party made the northernmost Spanish exploration trip into the central plains. A Pawnee and Otoe Indian attack defeated the Spanish forces; the survivors returned to Santa Fe, New Mexico, and the Spanish left the Great Plains to the American Indians.

As a result of the Seven Years' War (1756–1763) (called the French and Indian War in America), the French ceded all of their lands in North America east of the Mississippi River to the British. The Spanish took over lands west of the Mississippi River. Since there were few fur-bearing animals on the Platte of interest to the fur traders, the French and British explorers and fur trappers ignored the Platte territory for some time. During the course of the Napoleonic Wars (1803–1815), France briefly reacquired the land west of the Mississippi River from Spain.

In 1804, Napoleon sold the area west of the Mississippi River to the US in the Louisiana Purchase; the US roughly doubled its area at a cost of about $15,000,000. In 1820, the U.S. Army ordered Major Stephen H. Long to explore and map the area around the Platte. Long described the area as a great American desert, despite its native inhabitants and wildlife, because of a lack of easily cultivated land. As a result of his and other reports, the US initially had little interest in settling the land on the plains. The next "good" land was believed to be in Oregon or California, especially the coastal areas, and those were the destinations of most emigrant traffic. The Mormons settled Utah, largely due to religious persecution in eastern areas. Various gold and silver strikes attracted further emigration to nearly all western states.

The Native American trail west along the Platte, North Platte River, and Sweetwater River was first written about after its discovery in 1811 by Wilson Price Hunt of the Astor Expedition. He was returning to the Missouri River posts from the newly established Fort Astoria on the Columbia River near the Pacific Ocean. Because few American trappers and settlers were then in the contested Oregon Territory, his trail discovery was little used and nearly forgotten.

In 1823, Jedediah Smith and several trappers "rediscovered" the route. The trail along the Platte, North Platte, and Sweetwater rivers became a major route of fur traders to their summer Rocky Mountain Rendezvous. In 1824 fur trappers and traders directing mule trains carrying trade goods and supplies for the mountain men were some of the first European-American parties to use the trail. On their return trip, the fur traders carried out furs destined for eastern markets. The fur trade route was used until about 1840.

By about 1832, the fur traders had improved the trail along the Platte, North Platte, and Sweetwater rivers to a rough wagon trail from the Missouri River to the Green River in Wyoming, where most of the Rocky Mountain Rendezvous were held. In 1834, Benjamin Bonneville, a U.S. Army officer on leave, led an expedition to the west financed by John Jacob Astor. They took wagons along the Platte, North Platte, and Sweetwater River trail to the Green River in present-day Wyoming. The notable author Washington Irving wrote an account of Bonneville's explorations in the West that made him well known in the US.

Western trails in Nebraska. The Mormon Trail is in blue; the Oregon and California trails and the Pony Express route are in red; an alternate Oregon/California route is in dashed red; lesser-used trails are in orange. The Platte River is between the Mormon and Oregon/California trails. Fort Kearny is the black dot.

Following the fur traders, the major emigration trails established along the north and south banks of the Platte and North Platte River were the Oregon (1843–1869), California (1843–1869), Mormon (1847–1869) and the Bozeman (1863–68) trails. This network of trails, sometimes called the Emigrant Trails or the Great Platte River Road, all went west along both sides of the Platte River. The route along the Platte River included these emigration trails and was developed as a major trail used by wagon trains for westward expansion in the United States after 1841. The settlement of the Oregon boundary dispute with Britain in 1846, the conclusion of the Mexican–American War in 1848, and the California Gold Rush in 1849, along with other gold and silver strikes, rapidly attracted increased emigrant traffic westward.

The Platte River in the future state of Nebraska and the North Platte River in Wyoming typically had many channels and islands. The waterways were often too shallow, crooked, muddy, and unpredictable for a canoe to travel far. The Platte River valley provided an easily passable wagon corridor; it sloped gradually up in height as it went almost due west from the Missouri. The Platte route had access to water, grass, buffalo, and buffalo chips, which the Indians and emigrants used as fuel for fires. Long Native American use had created trails on both sides of the muddy, about 1 mile (1.6 km) wide and shallow Platte River. The Platte's water was silty and bad-tasting, but it was usable if no other water was available. Emigrants learned to let it sit in a bucket for an hour or so to allow most of the silt to settle. The trail(s) through the Platte River Valley extended about 450 miles (720 km) in the present state of Nebraska. Nearly all the trails from the Missouri converged on the Platte River at or before Fort Kearny in mid-state Nebraska. Historians have estimated that about 400,000 emigrants followed the trails along the Platte. The influx of so many emigrants strained the local ecosystem to the point that in 1846, chief They Fear Even His Horses demanded compensation from the President of the United States (referred to as tȟuŋkášila, the Great Father) for the damage Americans caused to the Platte. It also brought an epidemic of cholera that killed around 15% of the Lakota people between 1848 and 1849. The Lakota made plans for war, and in response, the United States convened the Lakota and other Plains Indians for the Treaty of Fort Laramie.

The Pony Express, operational from 1860–61, and the First Transcontinental Telegraph, completed in 1861, both followed the earlier emigrant trails along the Platte. The completion of the telegraph put the Pony Express out of business as it could provide much faster east–west communication. In 1866, the Union Pacific portion of the first Transcontinental Railroad was constructed along the Platte River as it started west from Omaha. In the 20th century, the Lincoln Highway and later Interstate 80 were constructed through the Platte Valley. The highways parallel the Platte and the North Platte through much of Nebraska.

Many of Nebraska’s larger cities originated on or near the Platte River, as it was the first path of transportation. These include Omaha (est. 1854), Fort Kearny (est. 1848), Grand Island (est. 1857) and North Platte (est. 1869). In 1859, settlers built the first irrigation ditch to divert water from the Platte for farming.

In March 1924, the U.S. Army Air Corps conducted a three-day bombing campaign on an ice gorge that threatened bridges near the town of North Bend.

== Ecosystem ==
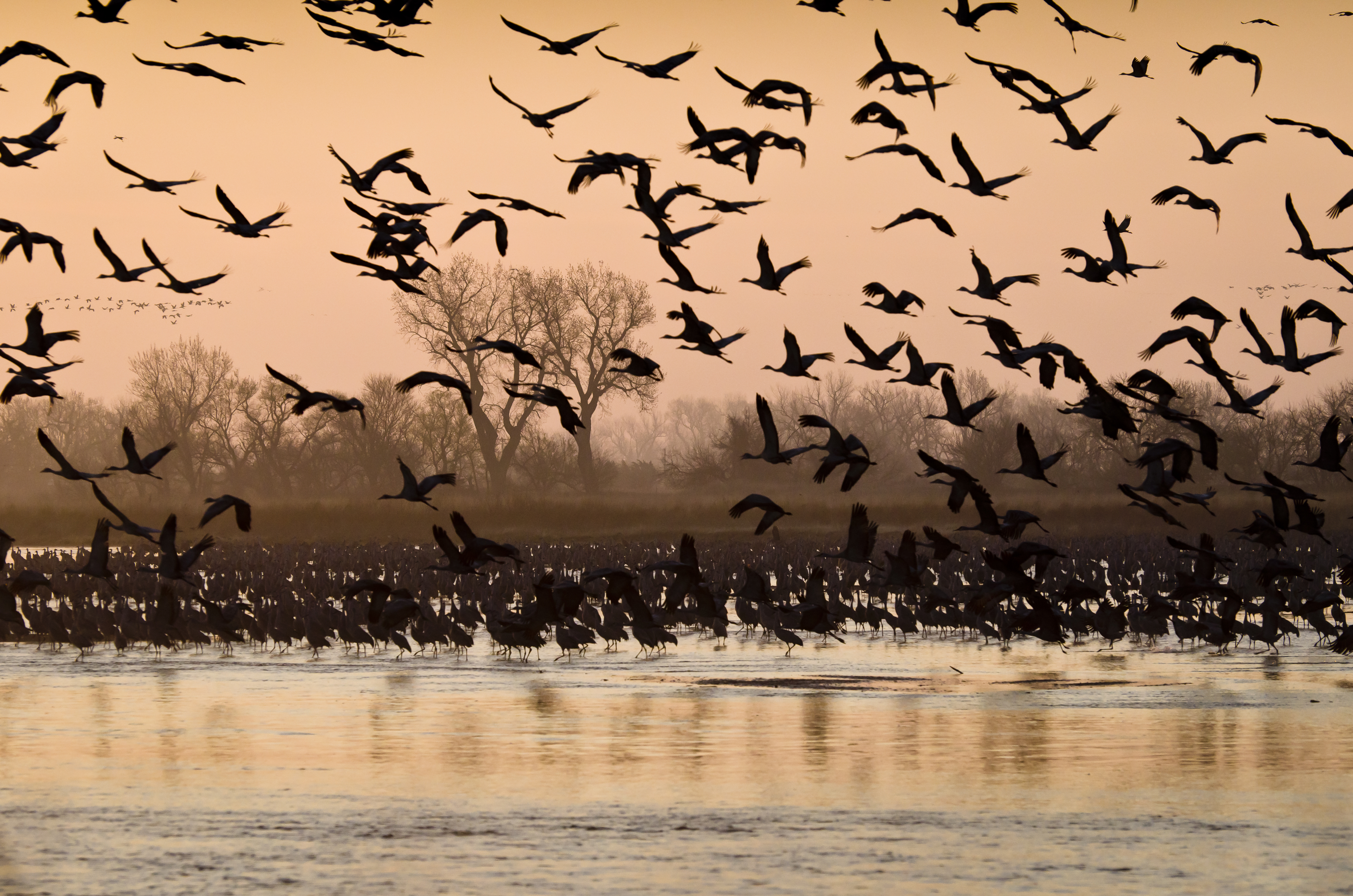
Every year hundreds of thousands of sandhill cranes congregate on the Platte River during their spring migration, forming large flocks that use the sandbars of the Platte River as a nighttime refuge before dispersing to local fields to feed during the day.

The Platte is in the middle of the Central Flyway, a primary north–south corridor for migratory birds from their summer nesting grounds in the north (Alaska and Canada), south for the winter, and the return in the spring. The Central Flyway bird species include trumpeter swans, tundra swans, over one million Canada geese, greater white-fronted geese, two subspecies of sandhill cranes, "the lesser sandhill and the greater sandhill", canvasback ducks and others. Other species such as bald eagles, herons and several species of ducks migrate through the Platte River area but over shorter distances. The whooping crane, piping plover, and the interior least tern are birds using the flyway that have been classified as endangered and are protected under the Platte River Endangered Species Partnership.

Common plants in the Platte River area are big and little bluestem, switch grass, and cottonwood trees. White-tailed deer, many types of catfish, Canada geese, and bald eagles attract fans. The Platte River area has long supported many animal species, but recently, due to urbanization and farming that have caused habitat loss, their numbers have declined. Canada geese have adapted to the farm fields and scavenge a large part of their fare from unharvested grain. Many have taken up residence at suburban office parks and stopped seasonal migrations.

== Management and policy ==
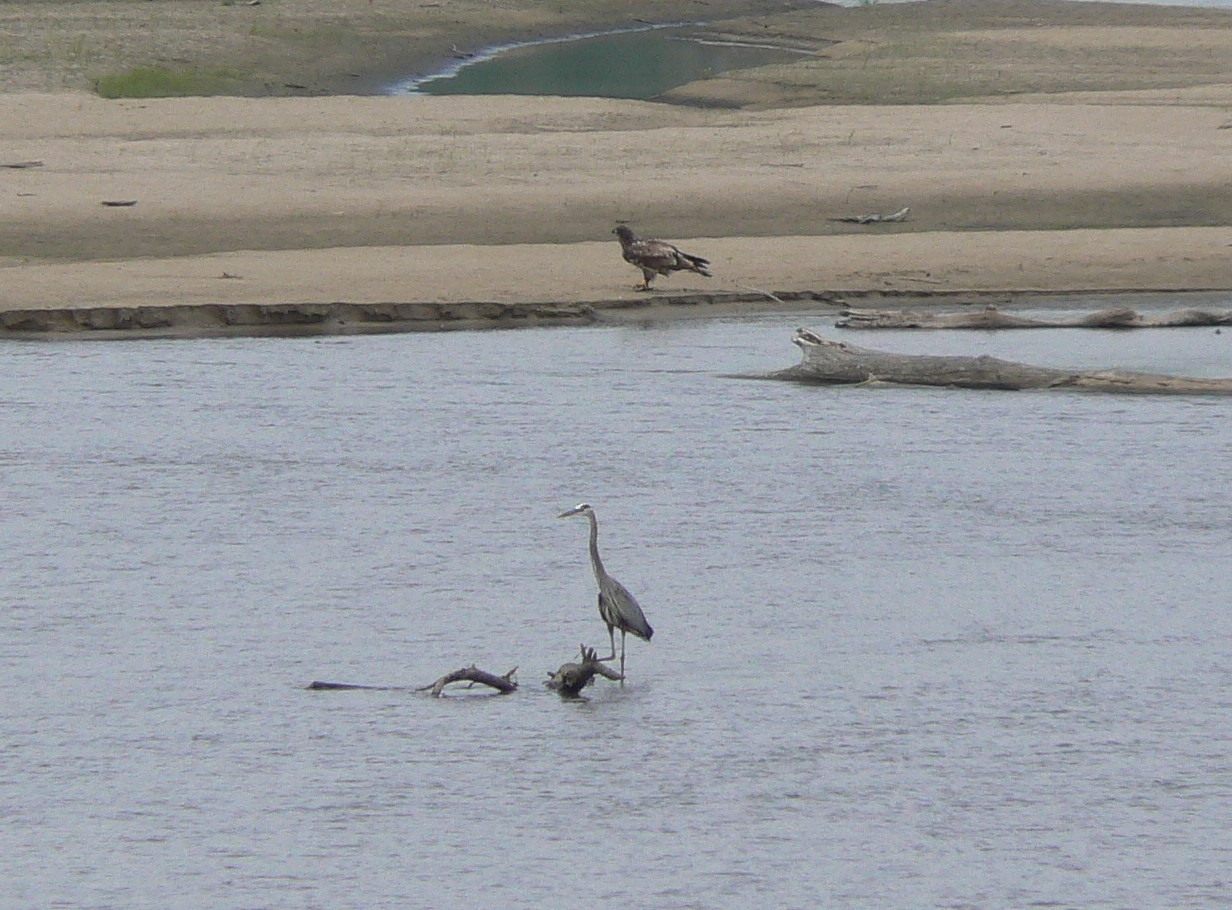
A great blue heron and immature bald eagle on the Platte River in Nebraska

The Platte River, flowing through an arid part of the Midwest, has been widely overused. The claims on the Platte River water have exceeded the water supply in drier years. Under Nebraska law, a river basin, subbasin, or reach shall be deemed overappropriated if it is subject to an interstate cooperative agreement among more states and if, before such date, the state has declared a moratorium on the issuance of new surface water appropriations in such river, subbasin, or reach, and has requested each natural resources district jurisdiction in the affected area to close or continue in effect a previously adopted closure of part of such river basin, subbasin, or reach to the issuance of additional water well permits, or to temporarily suspend or continue in effect a temporary suspension previously adopted on the drilling of new water wells in all or part of such river basin, subbasin, or reach. Most of the Platte River basin is currently considered overappropriated.

Beginning in 2004, several Nebraska stakeholders embarked upon the Platte River Cooperative Hydrology Study (COHYST). Conducted with assistance from the United States Geological Survey and the Natural Resources Conservation Service, this study attempts to arrive at a better understanding of the geology and hydrology of the Platte River basin from the Colorado and Wyoming borders to Columbus, including the Loup basin. This improved understanding could inform policies for managing the river system, both for human use and for protecting the basin's endangered species. As of October 2009, the study is still ongoing.

== See also ==
- List of Nebraska rivers
- Morning Star Lake (Nebraska)
- Platte River State Park
