= Booby Island (Queensland) =

Island in Queensland, Australia

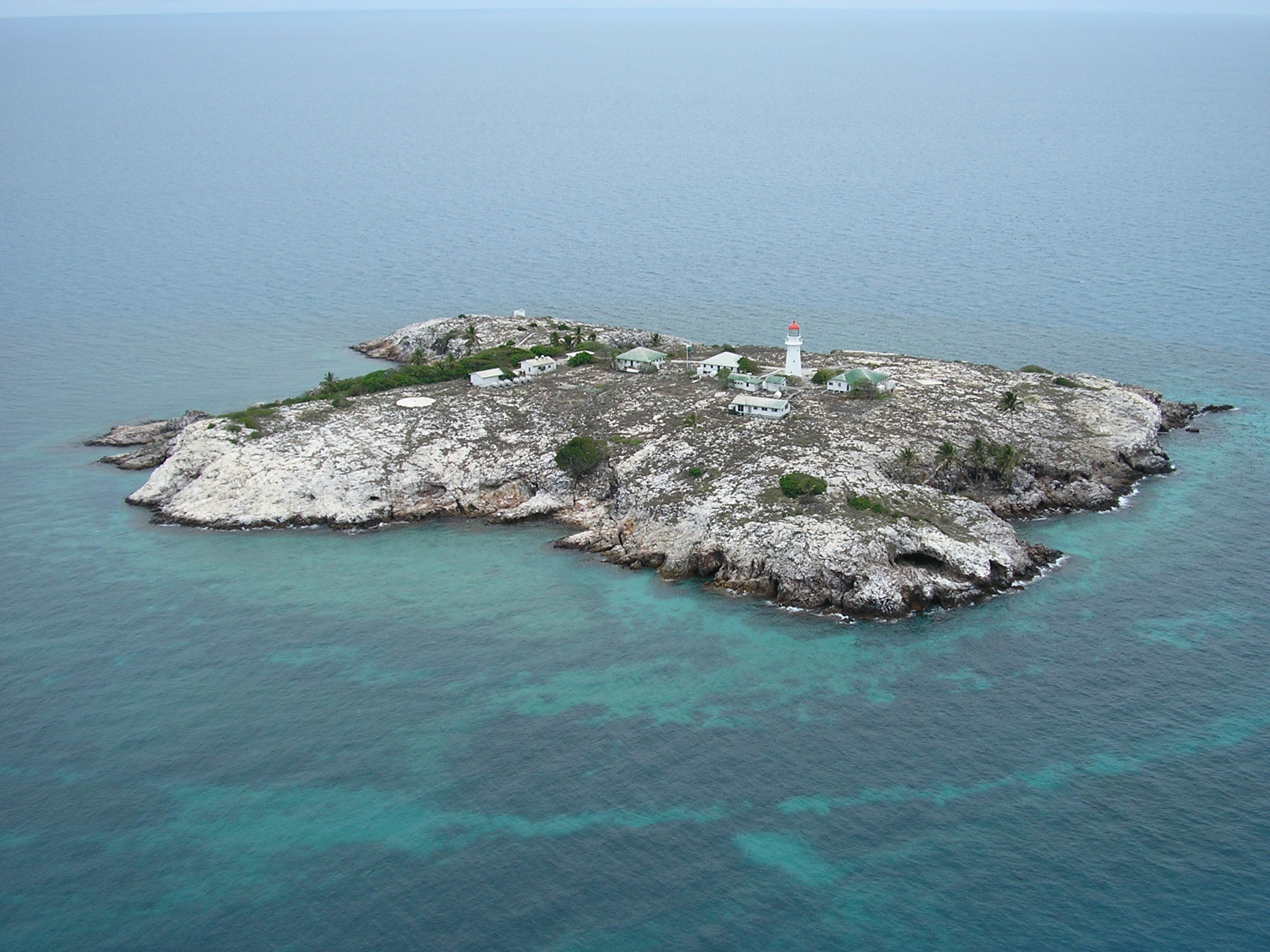
An aerial view of Booby Island from the south.

Booby Island is located 45 km (28 mi) northwest of Muttee Heads at the tip of Cape York Peninsula in Queensland, Australia. This island is in the Torres Strait, 32 km (20 mi) west of Thursday Island and 23 km (14 mi) west of Prince of Wales Island. Booby Island is also known as Ngiangu by the Kaurareg people of the western Torres Strait, its traditional owners, named for the giant Ngiangu who was forced from a neighbouring island It has been called Booby Island by a number of European explorers, including Captain Cook, for the presence of the booby birds.

== Shipwrecks ==
In the 19th century, such a high number of ships were lost in the area that provisions were stored on the island for shipwrecked sailors.

Wrecks include:

- Delfshaven. Barque, 656 tons. Newcastle to Java.

Struck a sunken reef near Booby Island on 24 July 1862. As she was undermanned, the boats were launched with difficulty after big seas had driven her over the rocks into calm water. Natives and adverse currents prevented the survivors reaching safety on the Australian coast before one boat was abandoned and a course set for Timor.

- Kanahooka Iron steamship, 386 tons. Built 1883.

Foundered in a heavy gale south of Booby Island, 19 January 1894. She was overloaded with guano from Rocky Islet in the Gulf of Carpentaria; struck by heavy seas, she rolled over, giving the crew only a short time to launch boats and escape.

- Marina Barque.

Lost in Torres Strait, from Sydney to Singapore, 28 May 1866. Crew landed on Booby Island and a ship took them on to Singapore.

- Morning Star

On 2 or 3 July 1814, whilst on her way from Sydney to Batavia, she was totally wrecked at 12.4305°S 143.4217°E. Some of the survivors reached Booby Island, where Eliza rescued them in September.

- Pacific. Schooner.

Foundered off Booby Island, 6 July 1935.

- Shamrock. Schooner.

Involved in rescue of survivors from two ships (Hydrabad and Coringa Packet), on Booby Island.

== "Post office" ==
Booby Island became famous for its unique "post office": sailors left letters in a small cave on the northern shore of the island for other passing vessels to collect and deliver to various destinations. The cave also held emergency food supplies for shipwreck survivors and a logbook to record details of the weather, currents, etc.

== Lighthouse ==
In 1890 a lighthouse eventually took up service on the island, an 18 metres (59 ft) tall timber framed iron clad conical tower with a focal plane at 37 m. The light characteristic is one flash every 7.5 seconds. The tower is painted white with a red lantern room.

== Heritage listings ==
Booby Island has a number of heritage-listed sites, including:

- Booby Island Light

== Rock art and graffiti ==
Booby Island is also home to Indigenous rock art and graffiti in a number of shoreline caves. The first known documentation of this was in 1857, by Lieutenant Chimmo of the HMSV Torch writing of the ship names in the 'Post Office Cave'. The island became a stopping point for water and repairs for sailors traversing the Torres Strait in trading ships, and government ships from the early days of European colonisation, and many left their marks both alongside and overwriting the Indigenous rock art. The recollections of lighthouse keepers and their families in newspaper articles and books never fail to mention the painted caves, and some of their names also appear amongst the graffiti.

The Indigenous rock art and graffiti was photographed by a Queensland Museum team in the 1980s and 1990s, and subsequent studies have shown that there are marks left by:

- Indigenous visitors/occupants including depictions of sea creatures
- passing ships from as early as 1841
- individuals on the ships
- lighthouse keepers, their families and visitors (including a lighthouse inspector)
- Military personnel living on the island during WWII, members of a signals unit monitoring the Pacific.
