= Daniel Bachman =

American guitarist

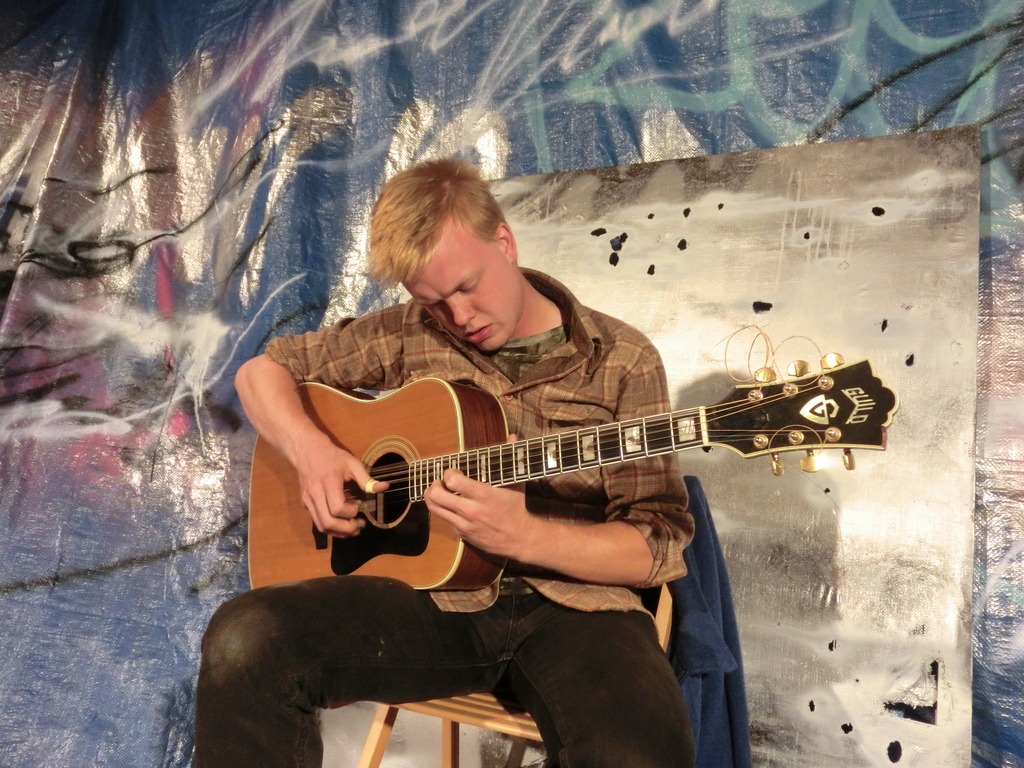

Background information
- Also known as: Sacred Harp
- Born: Fredericksburg, Virginia, U.S.
- Genres: American primitive guitar, folk, country blues, drone, noise, experimental
- Occupation: Musician
- Instruments: Guitar, Twelve-string guitar, Lap steel guitar
- Website: www.danielbachman.com

Daniel Bachman (born 1989) is an American Primitive guitarist, drone musician, and independent scholar from Fredericksburg, Virginia, United States.

== Career ==
Bachman's first projects were released under the moniker Sacred Harp. In 2011, Bachman released Grey-Black-Green, his first release under his own name. Although primarily a solo player, Bachman has also worked with several collaborators across various projects, including full collaborative albums with the guitarist Ryley Walker and multi-instrumentalist Ian McColm.

== Critical reception ==
In 2015, Rolling Stone named Bachman one of "10 Artists You Need to Know." NPR described him as an "established and thoughtful voice in the solo guitar music scene" who contributed "languid slide guitar" in one piece, and with hammer-ons "piercing like a floodlight out of darkness" in another. Stereogum describes him as "from the same acoustic-instrumental world that gave us the great folk visionary William Tyler, and his music has the same sort of out-of-time float that Tyler’s does."

== Discography ==
=== Sacred Harp ===
- Green Alum Springs (self-released)
- Apparitions at the Kenmore Plantation (self-released)

=== Daniel Bachman ===
- Grey-Black-Green (2011, Debacle Records)
- Of Deathly Premonitions with Ryley Walker (2011, Plustapes)
- Oh Be Joyful (2012, One Kind Favor)
- Seven Pines (2012, Tompkins Square)
- Taman Shud with Ian McColm (2012, Feeding Tube Records)
- Funny How Plans Change: Parts I–IV (2012, Marmara Records)
- Jesus I'm a Sinner (2013, Tompkins Square)
- Orange County Serenade (2014, Bathetic Records)
- Daniel Bachman (2014, Lancashire and Somerset)
- River (2015, Three Lobed Recordings)
- Daniel Bachman (2016, Three Lobed Recordings)
- The Morning Star (2018, Three Lobed Recordings)
- Green Alum Springs (2020, Three Lobed Recordings)
- Axacan (2021, Three Lobed Recordings)
- Lonesome Weary Blues (2022, Three Lobed Recordings)
- Almanac Behind (2022, Three Lobed Recordings)
- When the Roses Come Again (2023, Three Lobed Recordings)
- Quaker Run Wildfire (10/24/23–11/17/23) for Fiddle and Guitar (2023, Self Released)
- Moving Through Light (2025, Self Released)
- As Time Draws Near (2025, Self Released)
