= Eliza (1811 ship) =

1811 British merchant ship

History

United Kingdom
- Name: Eliza
- Builder: Calcutta
- Launched: 1811
- Fate: Wrecked June 1815

General characteristics
- Tons burthen: 197, or 200 (bm)
- Propulsion: Sail

Eliza was a merchant ship built in Calcutta, British India, in 1811. She made two voyages transporting convicts from Calcutta to Australia but wrecked in 1815 on her way home from her second voyage.

== Career ==
Under the command of Robert Murray, she left Calcutta with produce, passengers, and a number of prisoners. She called at Bencoolen sailing on 5 May 1813, and then at the River Derwent (Hobart), on 24 June. She lost her sails during a heavy gale and arrived in Sydney on 2 July. Eliza departed Port Jackson on 15 September bound for Hobart Town and Bengal. On her way on 30 September she rescued five survivors of the Morning Star that were stranded upon Booby Island, in the Torres Strait.

Eliza left Calcutta, under the command of Robert Murray, with produce, passengers, and a number of prisoners. She called in at Hobart Town and arrived in Sydney on 15 May 1815. Eliza departed Port Jackson on 28 May 1815 for Batavia and Calcutta.

== Fate ==
Eliza was lost in the Torres Strait on 11/12 June 1815.
