= Nightstar =

Nightstar may refer to:

- Nightstar (comics), DC Comics superhero
- Nightstar (train), Eurostar's abandoned sleeper service
- Nightstar Therapeutics, a pharmaceutical company acquired by Biogen

== See also ==
- Morning Star (disambiguation)
