= Morning Star, West Virginia =

Morning Star
- Unincorporated community
- Location within the state of West Virginia Morning Star (the United States)
- Coordinates: 38°46′29″N 81°27′19″W
- Country: United States
- State: West Virginia
- County: Roane
- Elevation: 823 ft (251 m)
- Time zone: UTC-5 (Eastern (EST))
  - Summer (DST): UTC-4 (EDT)
- GNIS ID: 1740951

Morning Star is an unincorporated community in Roane County, West Virginia, United States.
