= Catch a Rising Star (TV program) =

- Genre: Variety
- Presented by: Tommy Hunter
- Country of origin: Canada
- Original language: English
- No. of seasons: 1

Production
- Producer: Randy Markowitz
- Running time: 60 minutes

Original release
- Network: CBC Television
- Release: 7 May – 11 June 1976

Catch a Rising Star is a Canadian variety show that aired on CBC Television in 1976.

== Premise ==
Tommy Hunter hosted this program, which introduced emerging Canadian performers. They were joined by professional guest artists such as Julie Amato, Dave Broadfoot, Dinah Christie, Jack Duffy, Barbara Hamilton, Juliette, Catherine McKinnon, Billy Van, Bill Walker and Al Waxman.

== Scheduling ==
This hour-long program was broadcast on Fridays at 9:00 p.m. (Eastern) from 7 May to 11 June 1976.

== Reception ==
Joan Irwin of the Montreal Gazette blasted the program as an "inept series" and a "trashy offering".

== See also ==
- Canadian Idol
