= Rising Star Award =

Rising Star Award may refer to:

- ACB Rising Star Award, pro basketball league in Spain
- AFL Rising Star, Australian Football League
- EuroLeague Rising Star, European pro basketball league
- European Athletics Rising Star Award, European track and field, cross country running
- Galaxie Rising Star Award, Canadian music award, Stingray Music
- Rising Star Award, BAFTA, acting award, British Academy of Film and Television Arts
- Rising Star (Brit Award), upcoming musician award, British Phonographic Industry
