= The Morning Star (album) =

Studio album by Daniel Bachman
- Released: July 27, 2018
- Genre: Folk
- Length: 74:01
- Label: Three Lobed

Daniel Bachman chronology
Daniel Bachman (2016)	The Morning Star (2018)	Green Alum Springs (2019)

Professional ratings
Aggregate scores
Source	Rating
Metacritic	80/100
Review scores
Source	Rating
AllMusic	4.5/5 stars
The Guardian	4/5 stars
Pitchfork	7.6/10

The Morning Star is the eighth studio album by American musician Daniel Bachman. It was released on July 27, 2018, by Three Lobed Recordings.

== Critical reception ==
The Morning Star was met with "generally favorable" reviews from critics. At Metacritic, which assigns a weighted average rating out of 100 to reviews from mainstream publications, this release received an average score of 80 based on 9 reviews. Aggregator Album of the Year gave the release a 83 out of 100 based on a critical consensus of 5 reviews.

Thom Jurek of AllMusic noted the album is "at once brave and solitary, gentle and bracing, provocative and spiritually resonant. It extends Bachman's reach, allowing him to paint the innermost dimensions of the world he perceives and cleave it open for light to flood in and illuminate it for us."

=== Accolades ===
Accolades for The Morning Star
Publication	Accolade	Rank
AllMusic	AllMusic's Top Folk and Americana Albums of 2018	N/A

== Track listing ==
The Morning Star track listing
No.	Title	Length
1.	"Invocation"	18:49
2.	"Sycamore City"	12:53
3.	"Car"	5:26
4.	"Song for the Setting Sun III"	6:12
5.	"Song for the Setting Sun IV"	11:48
6.	"Scrumpy"	5:14
7.	"New Moon"	13:38

== Personnel ==
Musicians

- Daniel Bachman – vocals, guitar
- Forrest Marquisee – fiddle
- Ian McColm – cymbals

'Production

- Scott Caligan – layout
- Patrick Klem – mastering, mixing
