= HMS Morning Star =

Four ships of the Royal Navy have borne the name HMS Morning Star, after the poetic name for Venus:

- HMS Morning Star (1672) was a 14-gun ketch captured from the Dutch in 1672 and given away in 1674.
- HMS Morning Star (1763) was a cutter purchased in 1763 and sold in 1773. She then underwent a large repair and became a slave ship, first under her existing name and then as Fanny. She was last listed in 1778.
- HMS Morning Star (1781) was a 16-gun sloop, formerly the American privateer Congress that HMS Oiseau captured in 1781; the Navy sold her in 1782.
- HMS Morning Star (1915) was an M-class destroyer launched in 1915 and sold in 1921.

Note: Colledge & Warlow list an HMS Morning Star and describe her a 22-gun sloop of 350 tons burthen launched in 1799 at the Bombay Dockyard for the Indian [Navy]. However, there was no Indian Navy at the time, only the Bombay Marine, the naval arm of the British East India Company. More critically, the most complete list of ships built at the Bombay Dockyard shows no such vessel. It does show a Mornington, of 22 guns and 438 tons burthen being launched in 1799. She was later sold at auction.
