= List of airports in the Cape Town area =

The following are airports serving the Cape Town area.

== List ==
Airport name	ICAO	IATA	Coordinates	Elevation
Commercial airports				
Cape Town International Airport	FACT	CPT	33°58′10″S 18°35′50″E	46 m / 151 ft
General aviation airports				
Atlantic Aerodrome	FAAA		33°35′17.5″S 18°37′05.4″E	73 m / 240 ft
Cape Winelands Airport	FAWN		33°46′17″S 18°44′25″E	125 m / 410 ft
Morningstar Airfield		ident ZA-0120	33°45′33″S 18°32′54″E	125 m / 200 ft
Stellenbosch Aerodrome	FASH		33°58′46″S 18°49′18″E	90 m / 295 ft
Military airports				
AFB Ysterplaat	FAYP		33°54′23″S 18°29′42″E	16 m / 49 ft

== See also ==
- List of airports in South Africa
