= Morgenster (ship) =

1919 Dutch sail training ship

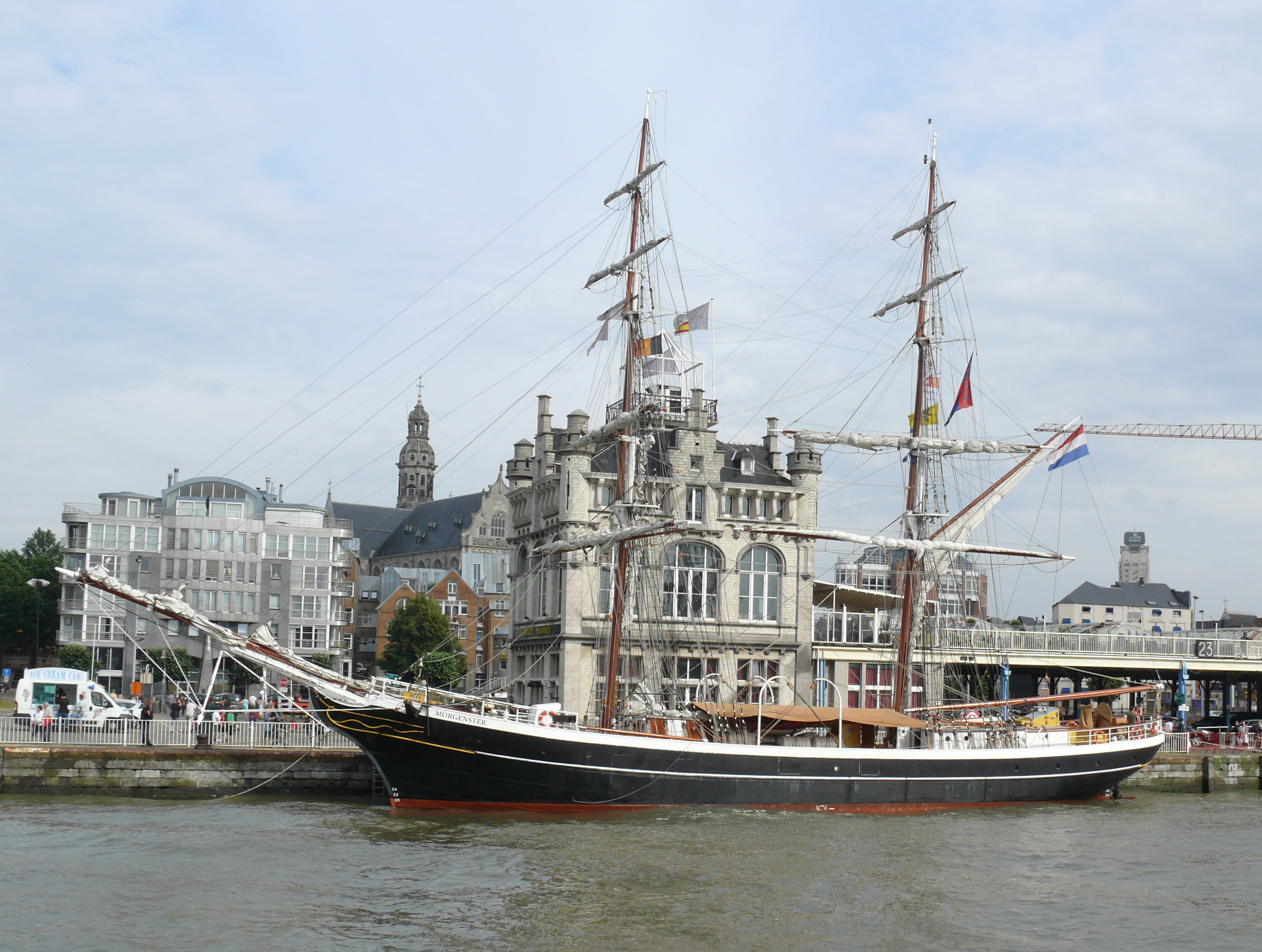
- Morgenster alongside at Antwerp in 2010

History

Netherlands
- Name: Morgenster
- Launched: 1919
- Identification: IMO number: 5241659
- Status: In service

General characteristics
- Length: 46.03 m (151 ft 0 in)
- Beam: 6 m (19 ft 8 in)
- Height: 29 m (95 ft 2 in)
- Draught: 2.4 m (7 ft 10 in)
- Sail plan: Brig

Morgenster (Morning Star in Dutch) is a sail training ship based in the Netherlands. She was built, as a herring lugger under the name De Vrouw Maria, in 1919. In 1927, she was lengthened by 7 metres (23 ft) and converted into a motor fishing vessel. She was renamed Morgenster in 1959 and continued to be used as a fishing vessel until 1970. After a period of use for sport fishing and in the pirate radio business, she was acquired by her current owners for conversion back to a sailing vessel in 1983. She made her maiden voyage as a sail training ship in 2008, having been refitted as a brig.

== Gallery ==
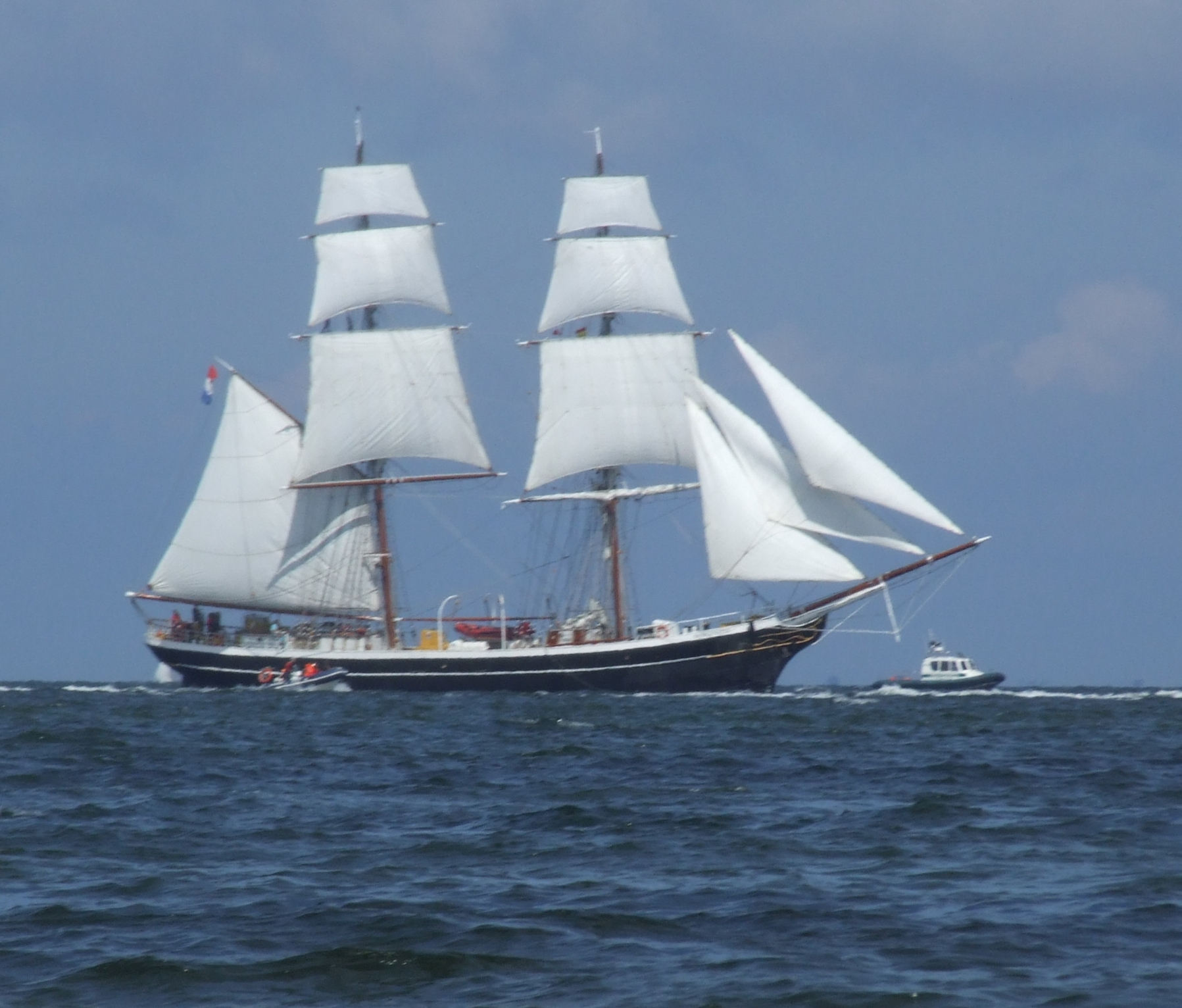
Morgenster at Gdynia in 2009

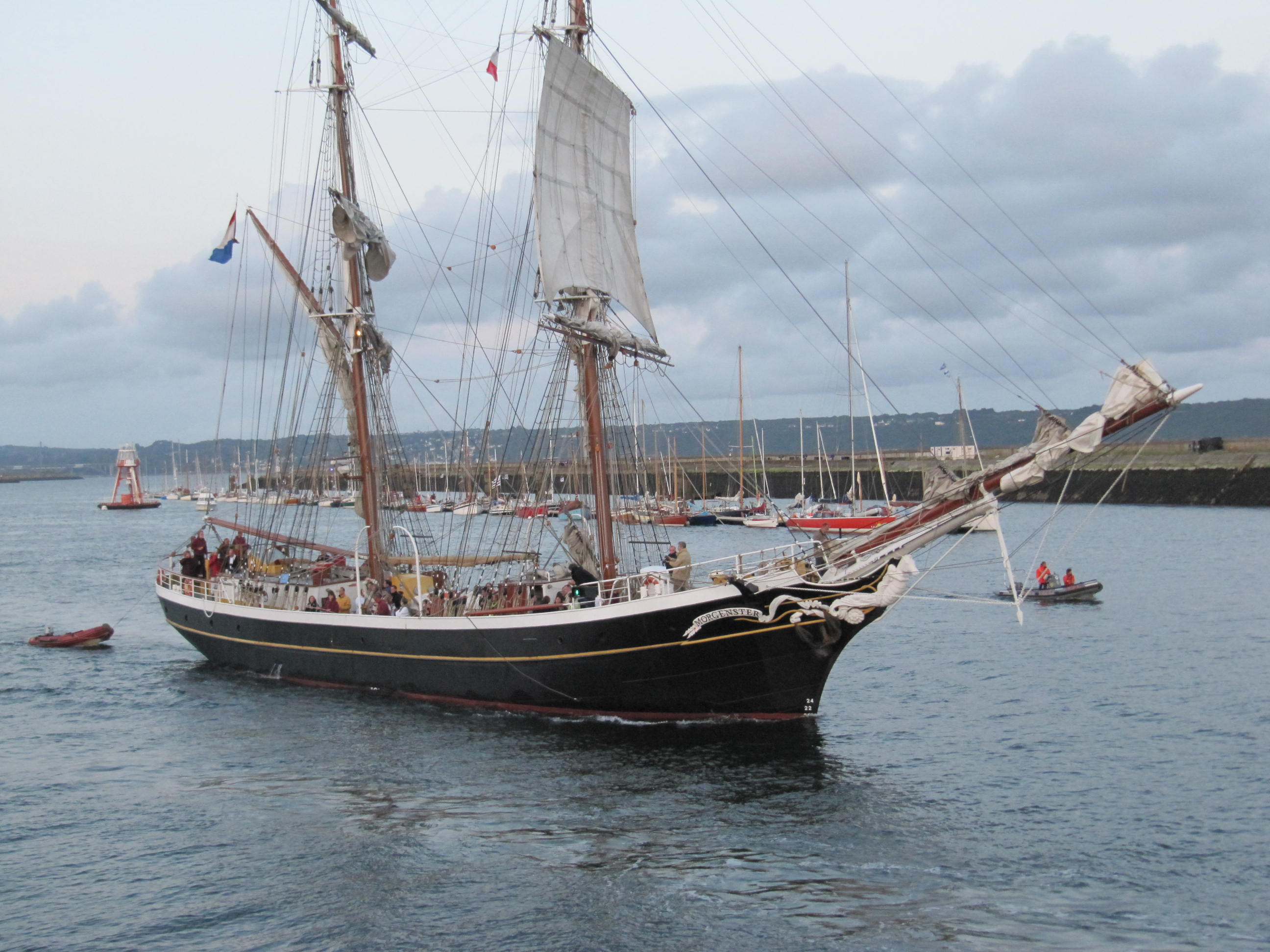
Morgenster at Brest in 2012

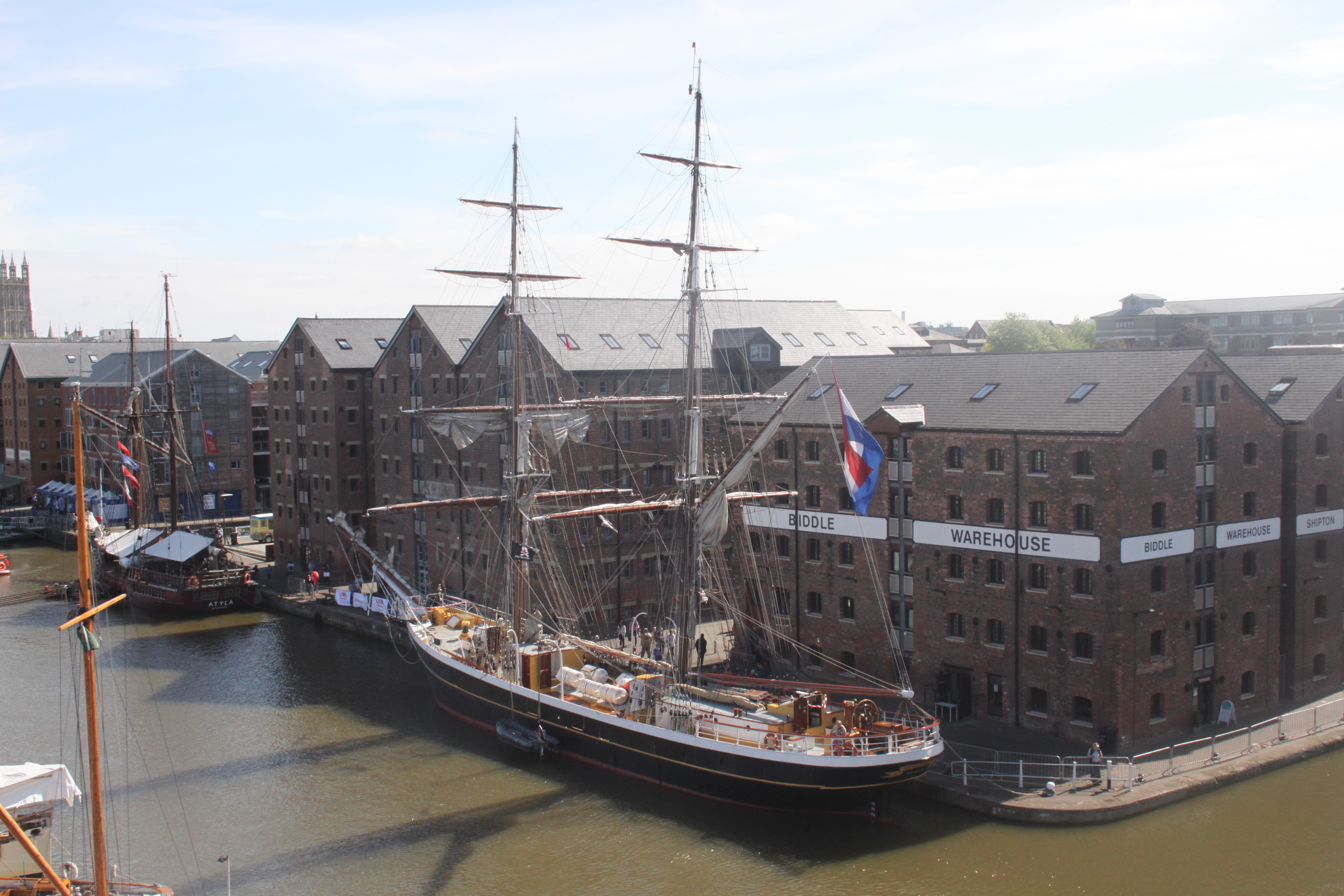
Morgenster at Gloucester Docks in 2015

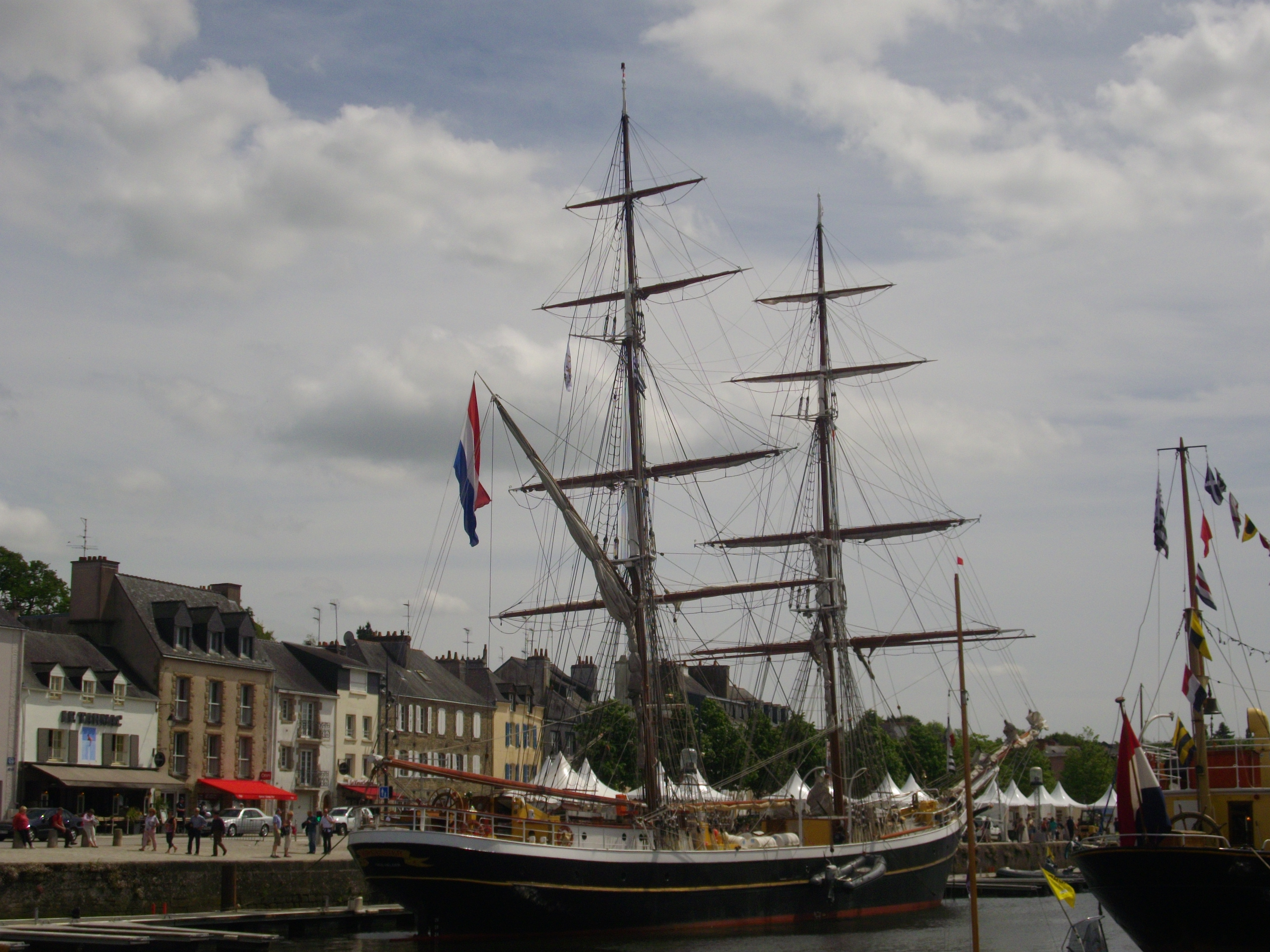
Morgenster at Vannes in 2015

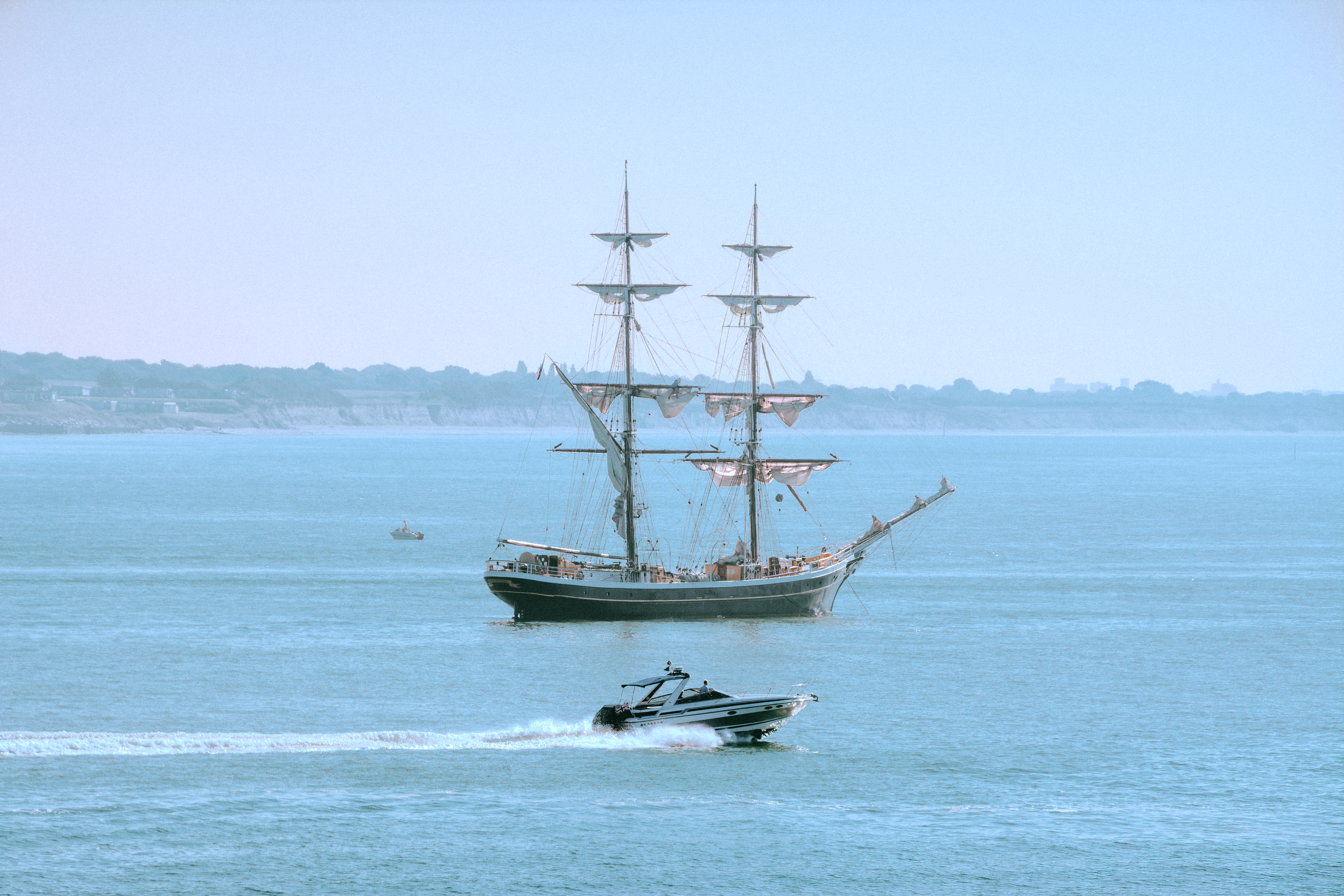
Morgenster on The Solent in 2021
