= Morning Star Lake (Nebraska) =

Lake in Nebraska, U.S.

Morningstar Lake
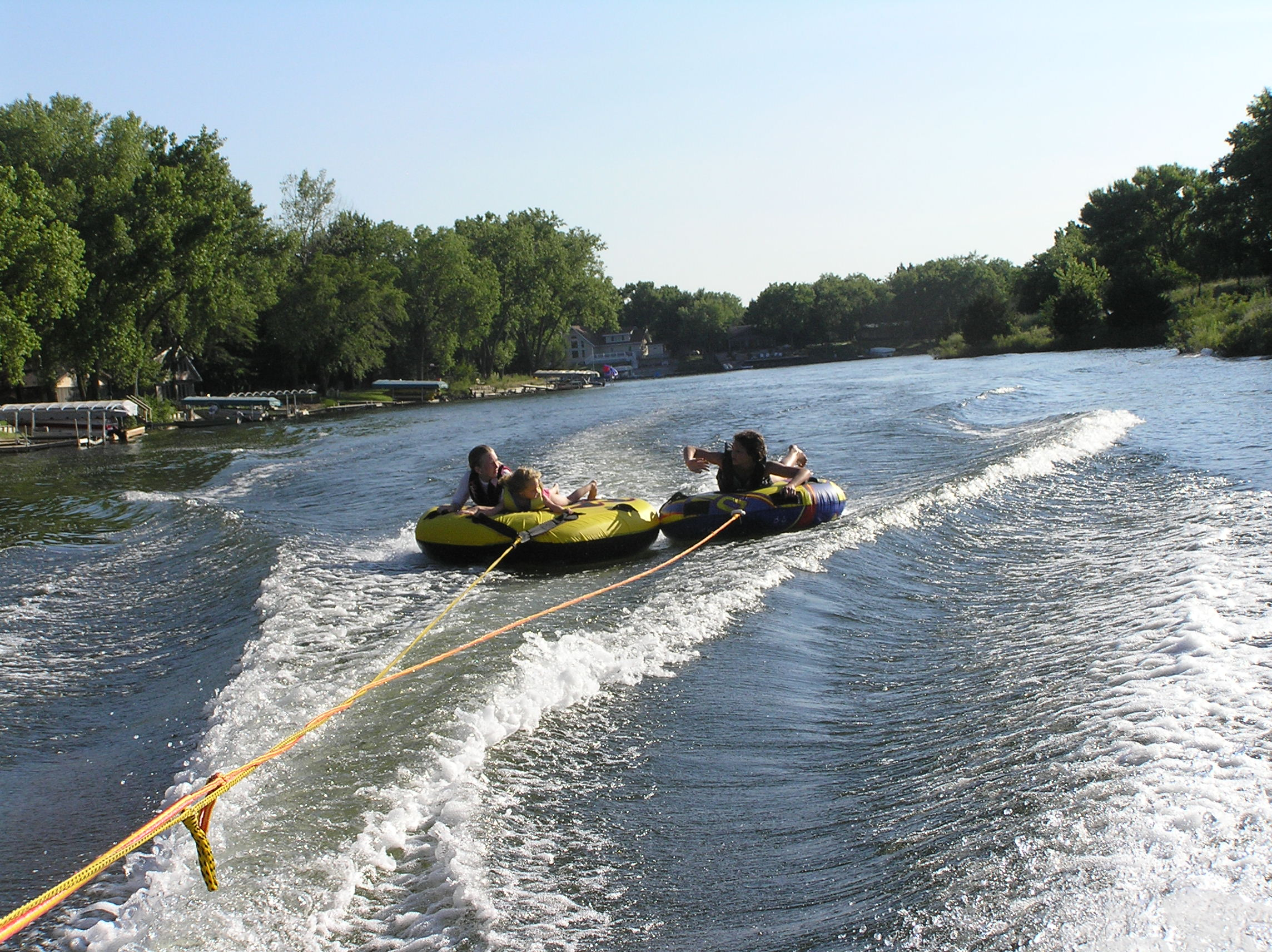
- Recreational users on Morningstar Lake

- Location within Nebraska Location within the United States
- Location: Clarks, Nebraska
- Coordinates: 41°11′20″N 97°48′37″W
- Basin countries: United States

Morningstar Lake is a lake in the central part of the U.S. state of Nebraska. Off the Platte River just outside Clarks, the lake is part of a complex of five private, manmade lakes called "Summerwood". The lakes were built as a result of the sand and gravel mining efforts of Overland Sand and Gravel. The lakes are spring fed, sand bottom lakes with clear, clean water. Summerwood is a gated community and Morningstar Lake has approximately 40 houses on it.

The lake's Fourth of July celebration includes a boat parade, sand volleyball, a scavenger hunt, sand castle contests and a community cookout, ending with a fireworks display.

== See also ==
- Geography of Nebraska
