= St. Louis Blues (1958 film) =

1958 film

- Film poster
- Directed by: Allen Reisner
- Written by: Ted Sherdeman; Robert Smith
- Produced by: Robert Smith
- Starring: Nat King Cole; Eartha Kitt
- Cinematography: Haskell B. Boggs
- Edited by: Eda Warren
- Music by: W. C. Handy
- Distributed by: Paramount Pictures
- Release date: April 10, 1958
- Running time: 105 minutes
- Country: United States

St. Louis Blues is a 1958 American film broadly based on the life of W. C. Handy. It stars jazz and blues greats Nat "King" Cole, Pearl Bailey, Cab Calloway, Ella Fitzgerald, Eartha Kitt, and Barney Bigard, as well as gospel singer Mahalia Jackson and actress Ruby Dee. The film's soundtrack uses over ten of Handy's songs, including the title song. In conjunction with the film, Cole recorded an album of W. C. Handy compositions, arranged by Nelson Riddle, and Fitzgerald incorporated "St. Louis Blues" into her concert repertoire.

== Plot ==
At the turn of the century in Memphis, a young boy named W.C. Handy (Billy Preston) is caught with a trumpet he bought by his Aunt Hagar (Pearl Bailey). His father, the Reverend Charles Handy (Juano Hernandez) rejects all music other than church hymns as songs of Satan, and destroys the trumpet upon discovery. Later, as a grown man, W.C. Handy is offered a teaching job his family approves of, but volunteers instead to write music for a local political campaign, drawing the attention of singer Gogo Germaine (Eartha Kitt) and nightclub owner Blade (Cab Calloway). While Germaine encourages Handy to continue writing popular music, his girlfriend Elizabeth (Ruby Dee) and father continue to discourage his dreams of pursuing a career as a jazz composer. After going blind and subsequently abandoning his jazz career, Handy returns to performing in his church and composing hymns, finally winning the approval of his father. His sight restored, Handy is still anguished by the loss of jazz in his life, and runs away from home to continue writing the music he loves away from the disapproval of his family.

Gogo Germaine, now a popular singer in New York, stops by Handy's home to visit and instead encounters Elizabeth. She challenges Elizabeth on her narrow minded views on jazz, and invites her and Handy's family to New York to hear his jazz music played in a concert hall. Upon hearing his jazz, Reverend Handy changes his mind, and finally embraces Handy completely, allowing him to both be loved by his family and able to pursue his composing career.

== Cast ==
- Nat King Cole as W.C. Handy
- Eartha Kitt as Gogo Germaine
- Cab Calloway as Blade
- Ella Fitzgerald as herself
- Mahalia Jackson as Bessie May
- Ruby Dee as Elizabeth
- Juano Hernandez as Rev. Charles Handy
- Teddy Buckner as Musician
- Barney Bigard as Musician
- George Callender as Musician
- Lee Young as Musician
- George Washington as Musician
- Billy Preston as Will Handy as a boy
- Pearl Bailey as Aunt Hagar
- Jester Hairston as Choir Master/Singer

== Release ==
The film had its world premiere on April 10, 1958, at the Fox Theatre in St. Louis, Missouri, less than two weeks after Handy's death.
