= HMS Morning Star (1763) =

Cutter of the Royal Navy

History

Great Britain
- Launched: 1761
- Fate: Sold 4 February 1763

Great Britain
- Name: HMS Morning Star
- Acquired: 4 February 1763 by purchase
- Out of service: July 1771
- Fate: Sold 4 May 1773

Great Britain
- Name: Morning Star
- Owner: Js.Bradley (1775)
- Acquired: 1773 by purchase
- Renamed: Fanny (circa 1775)
- Fate: Last listed 1778

General characteristics
- Tons burthen: 6914/94, or 70, or 75 (bm)
- Length: Overall: Keel:38 ft 3 3/4 in (11.7 m)
- Beam: 18 ft 6 in (5.6 m)
- Complement: Navy: 26; Slaver:21
- Armament: Navy; Originally: 6 × 3-pounder guns + 8 × ½-pounder swivel guns; Later: 4 × 3-pounder guns + 8 × ½-pounder swivel guns; Slaver: 6 guns

HMS Morningstar was a one-and-a-half year old cutter that the British Royal Navy purchased in 1763. It sold her in 1773. She then became a slave ship, first under her original name and then as Fanny. She was last listed in 1778.

== Royal Navy ==
The Navy purchased Morning Star on 4 February 1763 and had her fitted at Deptford. Lieutenant Patrick Leslie commissioned her in April for the North Sea. She initially sailed out of Hull. Lieutenant William Burstall commanded her on the North Sea station, also operating from Hull, between 1766 and 1769. Lastly, Lieutenant J. Lind commanded her on the North Sea station, operating along the Lincolnshire coast. She was paid off in July 1777. The Navy sold her at Sheerness on 4 May 1773.

== Slave ship ==
Morning Star then underwent a large repair. Morning Star, George Cleiland, master, sailed from Gravesend on 5 November 1773, bound for Africa. She arrived at Jamaica in 1774 and returned to Dover on 4 September and London on 10 September 1774.

Circa 1775 Morning Star became the slave ship Fanny. Fanny, Samuel Allen, master, sailed from London on 30 January 1775. On 21 February she put back into the Downs. While she was there ten of her crew took her boat during the night of the 21st and deserted, refusing to sail on the voyage. Captain Allen and the mate, with the assistance of men from Deal, brought her back into Ramsgate. On 31 March she arrived at Portsmouth from London. On 11 April she came into Spithead from Portsmouth for Africa.

== Fate ==
There is no further record for Fanny, Allen, master. She was last listed in LR in 1778.
