= St. Louis Blues (album) =

Studio album by Nat King Cole
- Released: May 1958
- Recorded: January 29–31, 1958
- Studio: Capitol (New York)
- Genre: Jazz
- Length: 32:47
- Label: Capitol
- Producer: Lee Gillette

Nat King Cole chronology
Cole Español (1958)	St. Louis Blues (1958)	The Very Thought of You (1958)

Professional ratings
Review scores
Source	Rating
Allmusic	3/5 stars

St. Louis Blues is a 1958 album by Nat King Cole, arranged by Nelson Riddle. St. Louis Blues was the soundtrack to the film of the same name that starred Cole. The Billboard album chart placed the disc at a peak position of #18.

== Track listing ==
1. Overture (Introducing Love Theme)/"Hesitating Blues" – 3:08
2. "Harlem Blues" – 1:51
3. "Chantez Les Bas" – 2:35
4. "Friendless Blues" (Mercedes Gilbert) – 3:15
5. "Stay" (Andy Razaf) – 2:37
6. "Joe Turner's Blues" (Walter Hirsch) – 2:40
7. "Beale Street Blues" – 2:56
8. "Careless Love" (Martha E. Koenig, Spencer Williams) – 2:44
9. "Morning Star" (Mack David, W.C. Handy) – 2:12
10. "Memphis Blues" (George A. Norton) – 3:06
11. "Yellow Dog Blues" – 3:16
12. "St. Louis Blues" – 2:27

All music and lyrics by W.C. Handy, other lyricists indicated. Overture written by Nelson Riddle.

== Personnel ==
- Nat King Cole – vocals
- Nelson Riddle – arranger, conductor
