= Morning Star Trust =

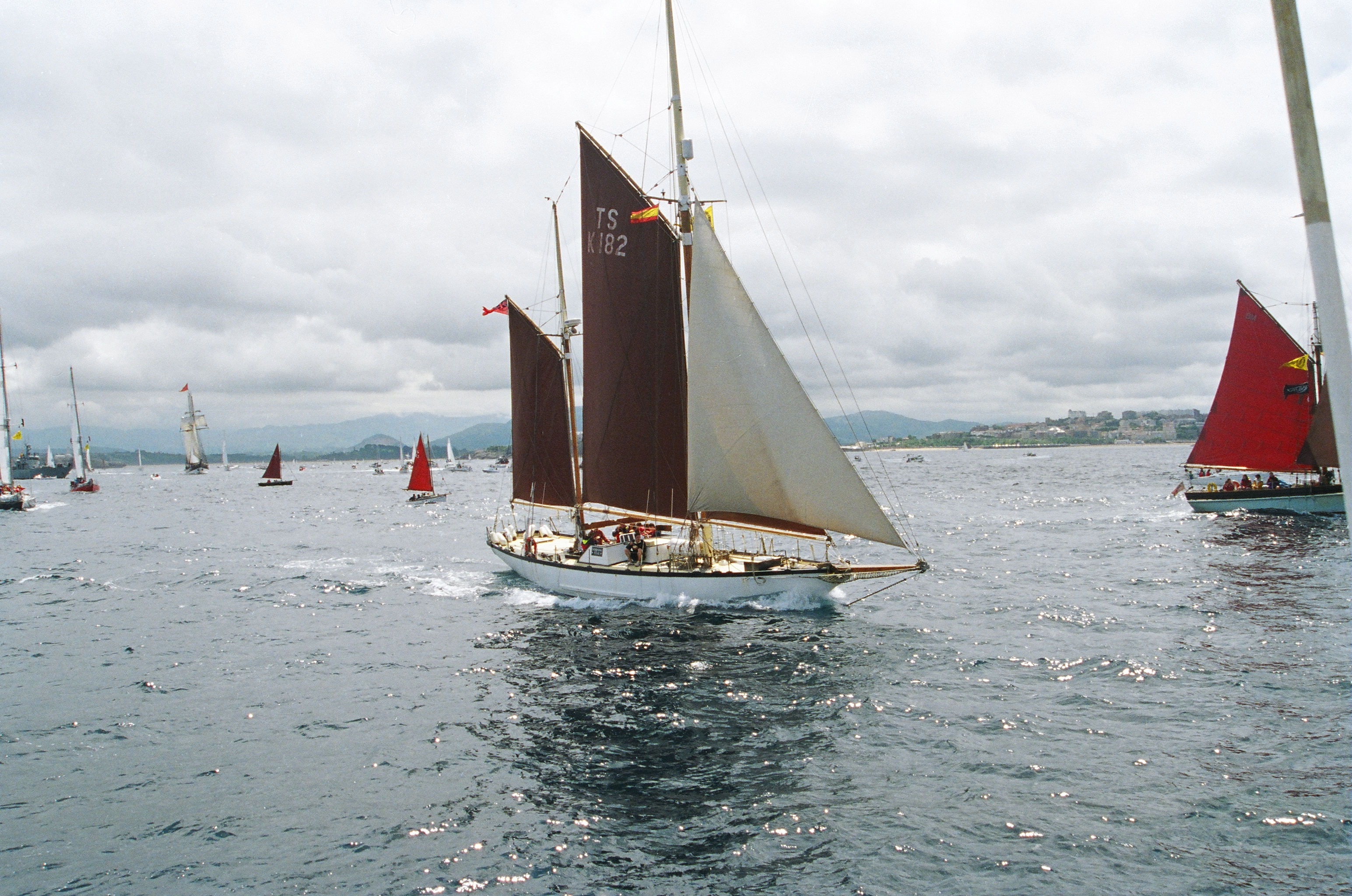
Morning star

The Morning Star Trust is a Christian sail training charity with the primary objective of the "Proclamation of the Gospel of Christ and the advancement of Christianity" by "sharing God's love and the good news about the offer of forgiveness and a relationship with God through Jesus" onboard their voyages.

The sail training organisation is based in England. They are a Royal Yachting Association training centre and member of the Association of Sail Training Organisations. The Trust is a Christian organisation, offering personal and spiritual development through bible readings and spiritual worship time onboard voyages. The charity operates three 11m expedition yachts: Bright Star of Revelation, a Westerly Oceanquest Bermuda sloop built to a one-off layout as specialist seven berth sail training vessel, and two Sigma 38s, Eastern Star of Revelation and Guiding Star of Revelation.

In a typical activity in 2004 a crew including five teenagers who had been given bursaries to allow them to take part, sailed to Denmark from Chatham in the Tall Ships Race.

== History ==
Physics teacher Tim Millward built Morning Star of Revelation, the Trust's original vessel, over the period from 1972 to 1978. This vessel is a 62' Gaff Ketch, in ferro-cement.

Morning Star came first in her first Tall Ships race, only to be disqualified because one of the crew members was too young. She competed annually in subsequent Tall Ships' Races, including the 2000 event when she crossed the Atlantic. In July 2013 the vessel won the Aarhus to Helsinki Tall Ships race, coming in as the overall winner on corrected time.

Morning Star received the MCA/ASTO Sail Training Vessel of the Year award in 2018, and when decommissioned in December 2019 was the oldest purpose-built sail-training vessel in the UK sail training fleet.
