= Till (surname) =

Till is a surname. Notable people with the surname include:

- Barry Till (1923–2013), Anglican priest, author and academic
- Benjamin Till (born 1974), English composer, director and film maker
- Brian Till (born 1960), American racecar driver
- Darren Till (born 1992), English mixed martial artist who competed in the UFC
- Emmett Till (1941–1955), African-American youth whose murder helped propel the American Civil Rights Movement onto the national stage
- Eric Till (born 1929), British film and television director
- Farrell Till (1933–2012), American anti-Christian campaigner
- James Till (1931–2025), Canadian biophysicist
- John Coates Till (1843–1910), Anglo-American marionettist, entertainer, and husband of Louisa Olive Middleton Till
- John Till (1945–2022), Canadian musician
- John Christian Till (1762–1844), American composer
- Louis Till (1922–1945), American soldier and father of Emmett Till
- Louisa Till (1854–1913), Anglo-American marionettist, entertainer, and wife of John Coates Till
- Lucas Till (born 1990), American actor
- Mamie Till (1921–2003), mother of Emmett Till
- Michael Till (1935–2012), English clergyman, Dean of Winchester 1996–2005
- Peter Till (born 1963), English former boxer
- Peter Till (born 1985), English footballer
- Philip Till, Canadian talk show host
- Stewart Till (born 1951), British film executive
- William Till (c.1697–1766), colonial-era American politician, jurist, and merchant

== See also ==
- Van Till
