= John Till (disambiguation) =

John Till may refer to:

- John Till, Canadian musician
- John Christian Till, composer
- John E. Till, American nuclear engineer and naval flag officer
- John Farrell Till, editor

== See also ==
- John Till Allingham, dramatist
