= Sodium Reactor Experiment =

Nuclear power plant in California, US

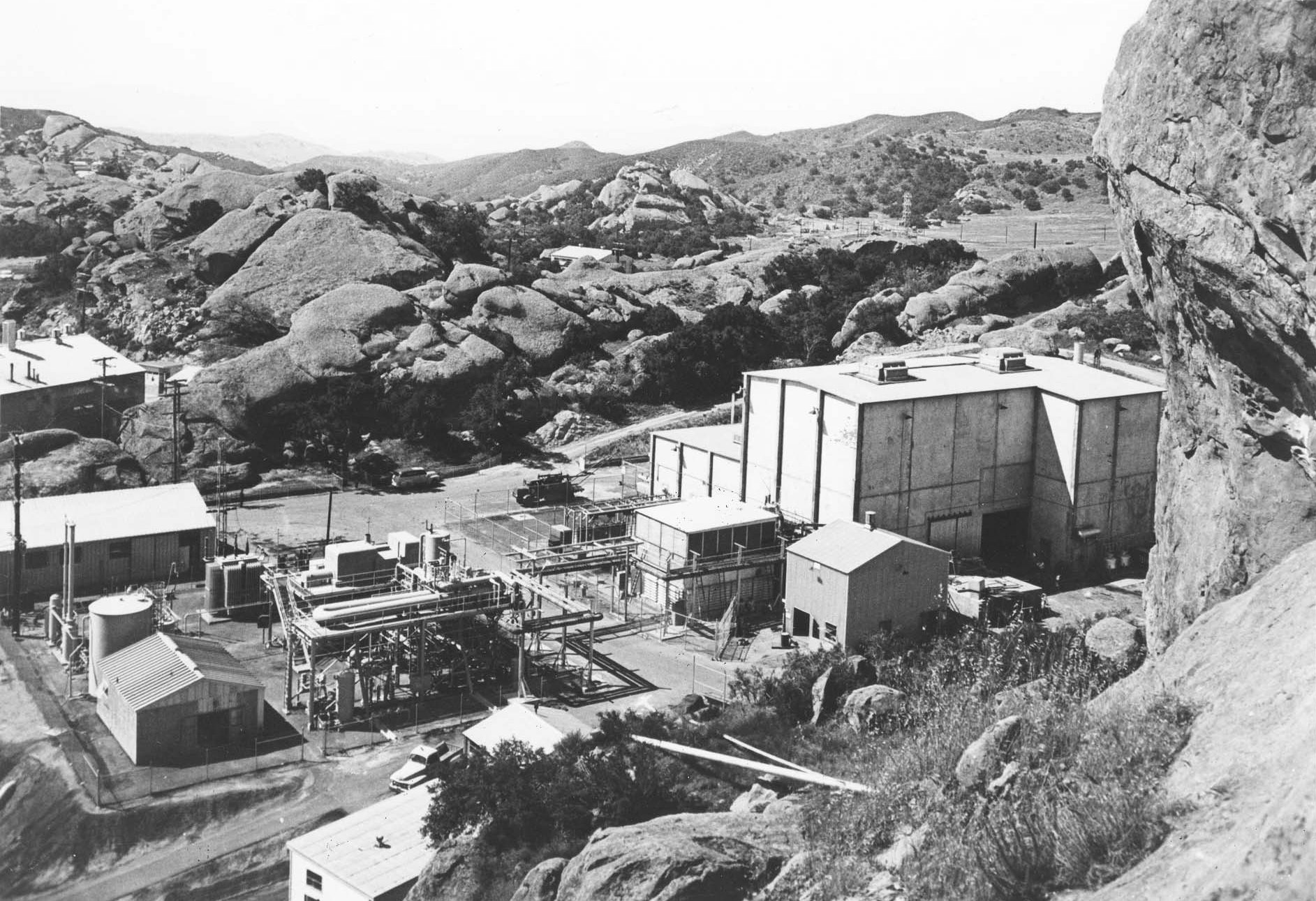
- The Sodium Reactor Experiment facility in 1958
- Country: United States
- Location: Santa Susana Field Laboratory, California
- Coordinates: 34°14′7″N 118°42′30″W
- Status: Decommissioned
- Construction began: 1954–1957
- Commission date: July 12, 1957
- Decommission date: February 15, 1964
- Owners: Atomics International Division, North American Aviation

Nuclear power station
- Reactor type: Sodium Liquid metal cooled reactor, graphite moderated

Power generation
- Units decommissioned: 1 x 20 MW
- Nameplate capacity: 6.5 MW

External links
- Commons: Related media on Commons

The Sodium Reactor Experiment was a pioneering nuclear power plant built by Atomics International at the Santa Susana Field Laboratory near Simi Valley, California. The reactor operated from 1957 to 1964. On July 12, 1957 the Sodium Reactor Experiment became the first nuclear reactor in California to produce electrical power for a commercial power grid by powering the nearby city of Moorpark. In July 1959, the reactor experienced a partial meltdown when 13 of the reactor's 43 fuel elements partially melted, and radioactive gas was released into the atmosphere. The reactor was repaired and restarted in September 1960. In February 1964, the Sodium Reactor Experiment was in operation for the last time. Removal of the deactivated reactor was completed in 1981. Technical analyses of the 1959 incident have produced contrasting conclusions regarding the types and quantities of radioactive materials released. Members of the neighboring communities have expressed concerns about the possible impacts on their health and environment from the incident. In August 2009 the Department of Energy hosted a community workshop to discuss the 1959 incident.

== Location ==
The Sodium Reactor Experiment facility was situated in a northwestern administrative section (known as Area IV) on a mountaintop known as The Hill of the Santa Susana Field Laboratory, about 30 miles (48 km) northwest of downtown Los Angeles in Simi Valley. When the Sodium Reactor Experiment was active, the Santa Susana Field Laboratory was operated by two business divisions of the North American Aviation company. The Rocketdyne division conducted liquid-propellant rocket engine testing and development at the site, while the Atomics International division focused on the development of commercial nuclear reactors and compact nuclear reactors for outer-space applications.

== History ==
In 1954, the United States Atomic Energy Commission announced plans to test the basic nuclear reactor designs then under study by building five experimental reactors in five years. The Sodium Reactor Experiment, designed by Atomics International, was one of the chosen reactors. Design of the Sodium Reactor Experiment began in June 1954, and construction was underway in April 1955. A local utility company, Southern California Edison, installed and operated a 6.5 MW electric-power generating system. Controlled nuclear fission began on April 25, 1957.

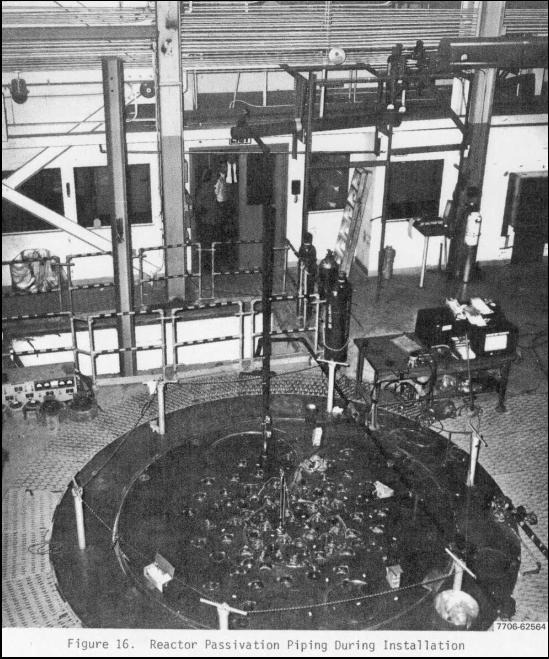
Sodium Reactor Experiment – Refueling head

The Los Angeles Times published a front-page story when Moorpark was supplied with nuclear-generated electricity. Edward R. Murrow’s television program See It Now featured the event as a special news report, broadcast on November 24, 1957. In July 1958, Atomics International produced a film describing the construction of the Sodium Reactor Experiment facility. The Sodium Reactor Experiment used sodium as a coolant. Heat generated in the reactor was transported by liquid sodium through the reactor facility piping system. The pumps used to move the sodium were hot-oil centrifugal pumps modified for use in a sodium system. A support system used tetralin (an oil-like fluid) to cool the pump seals, which prevented leakage of hot sodium at the pump shaft.

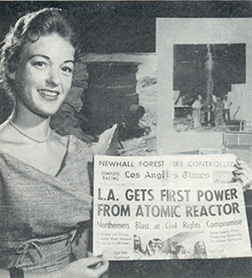
Gail Fowler of Atomics International displays an L.A. Times headline about the reactor's production of electricity (November 1957)

In July 1959, tetralin seeped into the primary coolant system through a pump seal and was decomposed by the high-temperature sodium. The decomposed tetralin clogged several narrow cooling channels used by the sodium system to remove heat from the reactor fuel elements. As the tetralin residues clogged the reactor's internal cooling channels, 13 of the reactor's 43 fuel elements overheated and were damaged. The exact date of the fuel damage is unknown, but is believed to have occurred between July 12 and 26.

At the time, operators were aware of unusual reactor behavior but were unaware of the damage. They continued operations for several days before shutting down the reactor for examination. When the operators attempted to remove the fuel elements from the reactor, most elements were removed normally but some were found to be jammed. Pieces of the damaged fuel elements fell to the bottom of the reactor. During the following months, Atomics International personnel removed all the jammed fuel elements, retrieved the pieces of dropped fuel elements, cleaned the sodium system and installed a new reactor core. The Sodium Reactor Experiment was restarted on September 7, 1960, nearly fourteen months after the accident. In 1961, Atomics International produced another movie explaining the accident and the recovery operation. The Sodium Reactor Experiment operated until February 15, 1964.

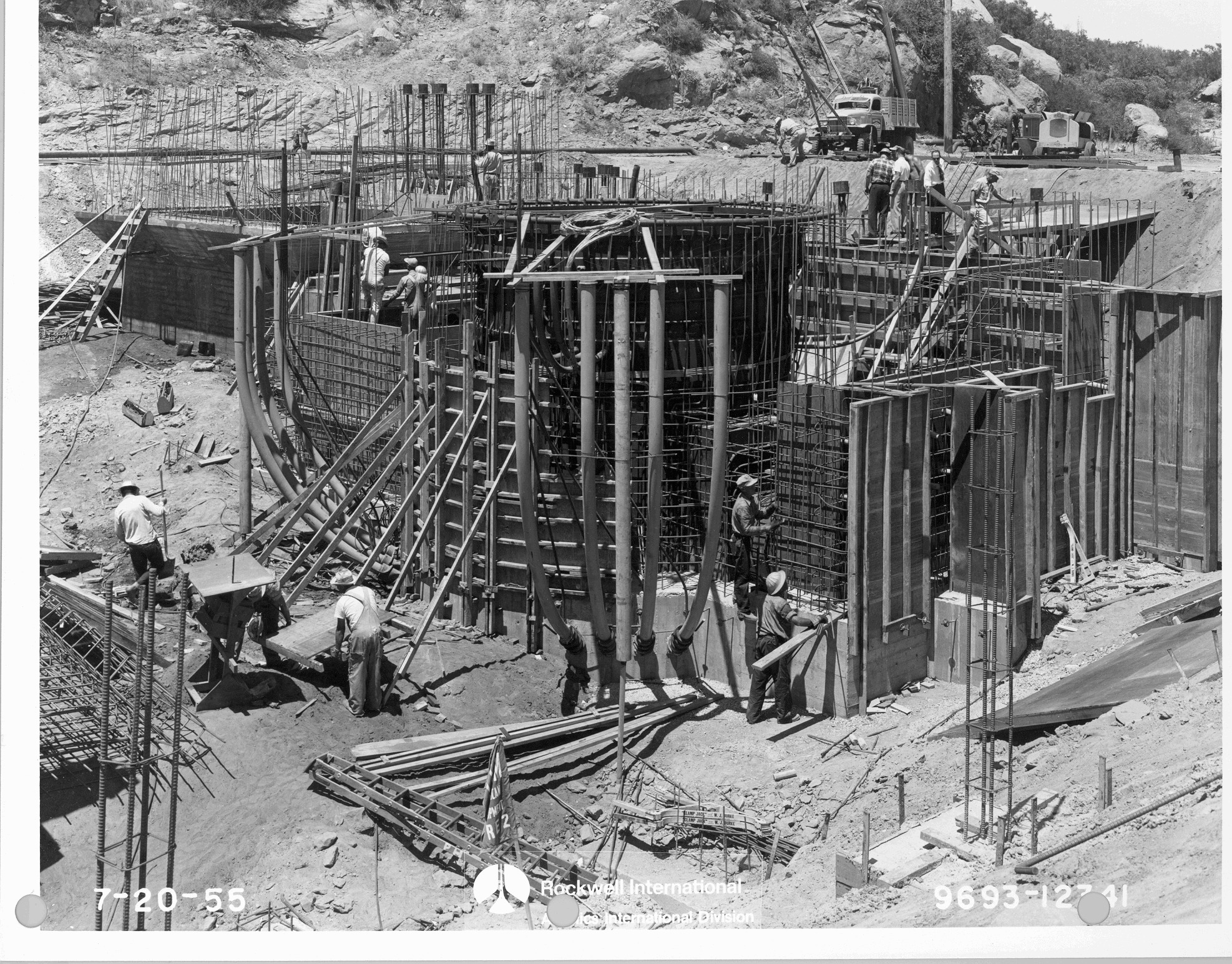
Sodium Reactor Experiment – Construction of the reactor

In 1964, several modifications were made to the reactor. These modifications were completed in May 1965, but the Atomic Energy Agency and Atomics International decided to close the reactor rather than restart it. The facility decommissioning began in 1976 with the removal of the reactor core, support systems and contaminated soil under the structure. The source of the contaminated soil underneath the building does not appear related to the 1959 reactor incident. Decommissioning was completed in 1981. In 1982, Atomics International produced a film on the decommissioning and decontamination of the Sodium Reactor Experiment.

A group of certified health physicists from the Argonne National Laboratory conducted independent sampling to determine if the then-current minimum cleanup standards for radioactive residue were met. In 1985, the United States Department of Energy completed its evaluation of the survey reports and certified “…that there is no evidence the facilities pose a radiological threat to either personnel or the environment”. In 1999, the remaining structures were demolished and removed from the site.

== Principles ==
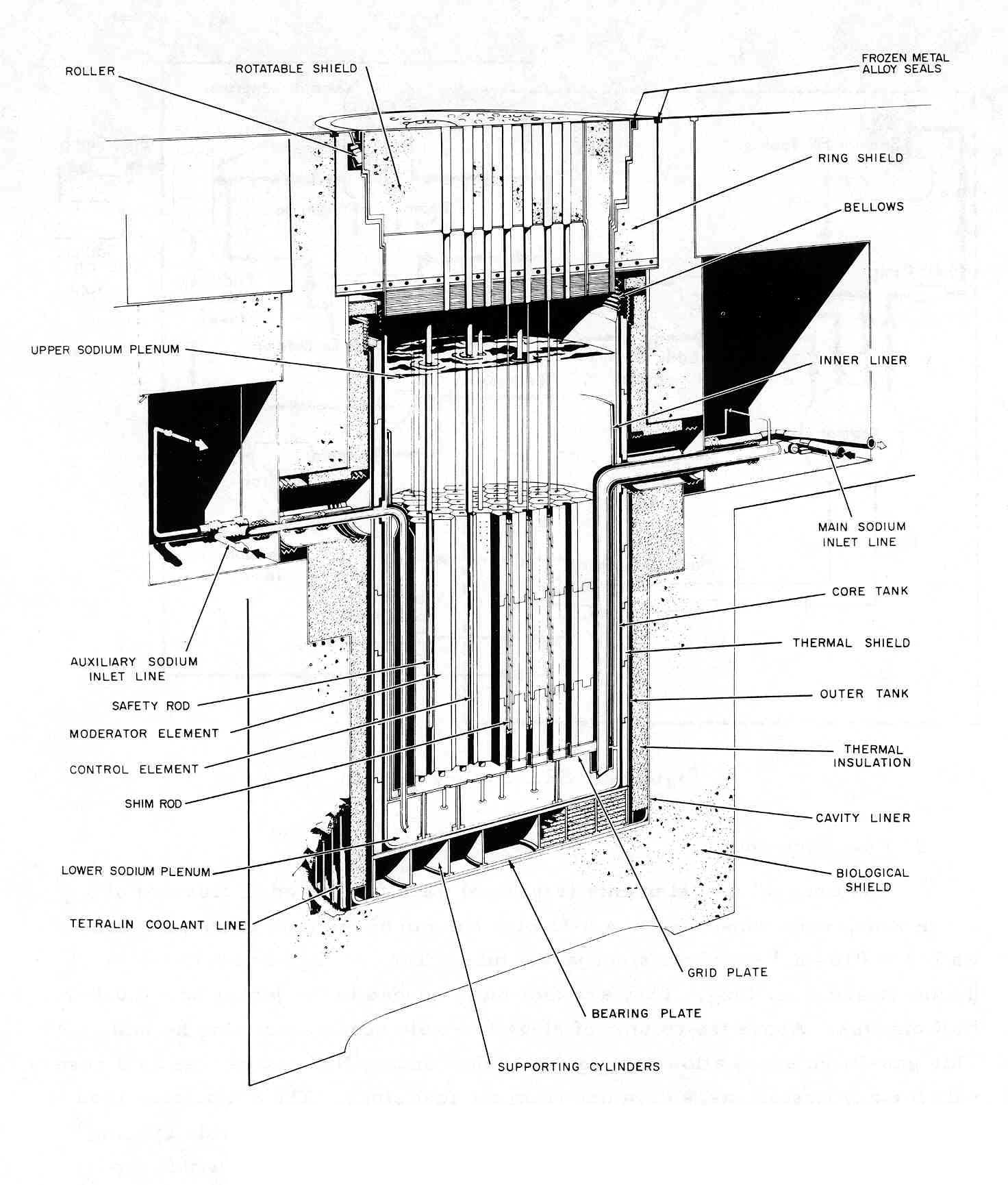
Cutaway view of SRE reactor; rotatable shield was 6 feet (1.8 m) thick (Jarett, pg. II-A-2)

The purpose of the Sodium Reactor Experiment was to demonstrate the feasibility of a sodium-cooled reactor as the heat source for a commercial power reactor to produce electricity. A secondary objective was to obtain operational data on slightly enriched fuel and uranium-thorium fuel mixtures. The reactor was designed as a flexible development facility, and was considered a development tool emphasizing the investigation of fuel materials.

Compared to water, sodium has a relatively low vapor pressure at the operating temperatures of the reactor. The Sodium Reactor Experiment design utilized sodium as a coolant so high-pressure water systems would not be required. The reactor did not have a containment pressure vessel, because the maximum credible accident would not release enough gas volume to require pressure containment. It was designed to retain gases at about atmospheric pressure and reduce diffusion leakage from potentially contaminated gas.

The Sodium Reactor Experiment included a complex of buildings, workshops and support systems. The reactor was housed in the main reactor building, which consisted of a high bay area and a hot cell facility. Three cleaning cells were located in the main building. The cleaning cells were designed to wash sodium from the fuel elements with water in an inert atmosphere. The cleaning allowed examination of the fuel rods after they were removed from the reactor. Because sodium reacts violently with water, the wash cell was sealed off and flooded with inert gas to minimize the reaction during washing. Operators worked behind thick walls to limit their exposure to radiation emitted from the fuel elements, which were loaded into the cell through a ceiling entrance hole (normally covered with a heavy shield plug).

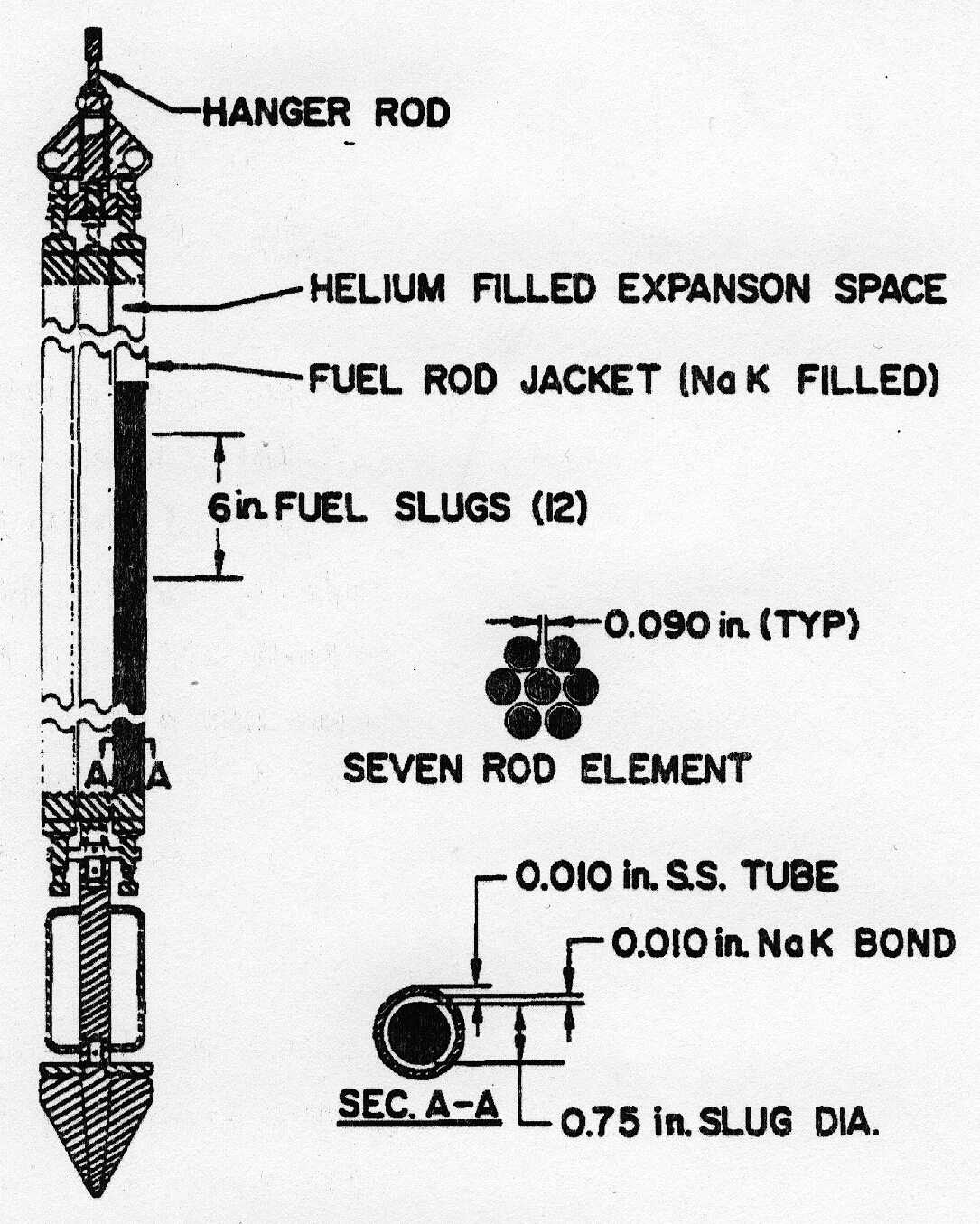
Fuel element from SRE reactor, 1957–1959; narrow clearance between fuel elements is in center (Jarett, pg. II-A-6)

The reactor core sat in a lower portion of a vessel lined with stainless steel and filled with liquid sodium. The Sodium Reactor Experiment reactor core contained 43 fuel elements, each comprising seven fuel rods. A fuel rod was a stainless steel tube six feet long, filled with twelve uranium fuel slugs. Many of the fuel elements in the SRE were instrumented with thermocouples located in the center of the fuel materials at several places in the core. Two of the thermocouples were monitored in the reactor control room, while the remaining measurements were recorded on instrumentation outside the control room. The sodium temperature was also monitored at several points within the reactor system.

At full power, sodium at a temperature of approximately 500 °F (260 °C) passed through a plenum chamber beneath the reactor core through the heat channels absorbing heat released from the fuel elements, and discharged into the upper pool (about 6 feet (1.8 m) deep) above the core at an average temperature of 950 °F (510 °C). This space was filled with helium gas, maintained at a pressure of approximately three pounds per square inch (gauge). Piping circulated 50,000 pounds (22,680 kg) of heated liquid sodium from the reactor vessel to one of two available heat exchangers. One heat exchanger transferred heat from the primary sodium loop, which in turn dissipated the heat in a steam generator which boiled water to make steam for use in a turbine generating electricity.

The gases used as a cover gas in the sodium systems (such as the reactor and fuel-assembly wash cells) are potentially radioactive. The design of the Sodium Reactor Experiment support facilities was to collect all such gases into a tank, compress them and put them into a gas holding tank until they had decayed sufficiently to allow discharge into the environment from an outdoor stack.

== 1959 incident ==
=== Limited experience ===
The Sodium Reactor Experiment was designed and constructed to gain experience in the use of uranium fuel in a reactor used to produce electricity. The fuel elements in the Sodium Reactor Experiment were operating under untried conditions. Fuel-design limits were based on theoretical limits, not operating experience. Cladding materials were untested, with little or no operating experience.

=== Before the incident ===
During the operation of the Sodium Reactor Experiment, its operators conducted several test cycles (known as “runs”) to correct and modify facility support systems, conduct reactor physics experiments and generate electricity. During run three, the Sodium Reactor Experiment became the first nuclear reactor in the US to produce power for a commercial power grid. During Run eight, a black residue (believed to be decomposed tetralin) was noticed on fuel elements removed from the reactor. The fuel elements were washed in the wash cell, and returned to the reactor. The reactor returned to operation for high-temperature testing. Several anomalous temperature readings were occasionally noticed during the next few runs, while the operators attempted to understand the behavior and its cause. At the end of run 13, it was obvious that something had occurred which impaired the heat-transfer characteristics of the system. It was decided that a tetralin leak had reoccurred, and was the cause of the trouble. The reactor sodium was purged with gaseous nitrogen, to remove volatile contamination.

=== Wash cell explosion ===
Following run 13, an attempt was made to wash a fuel element in the wash cell. During the operation, an explosion occurred of sufficient magnitude to lift the shield plug out of the wash cell. It is believed the tetralin-related decomposition products caused a substantial amount of sodium to be trapped in the fuel rod elements by blocking drain holes. There were no reported injuries or fatalities associated with the wash-cell explosion. As a result of the explosion, no further washing of the elements was done. Measurements from within the reactor building indicated extremely high radioactivity levels throughout the building. Within several days radioactivity in the high bay had been reduced to normal levels, except for the area immediately around the wash cells.

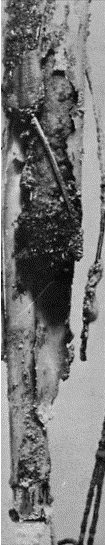
Partially melted fuel rod after the July 1959 incident

=== Run 14 (July 12–July 26, 1959) ===
Shortly after the reactor was restarted, radiation monitors inside the reactor building showed a sharp increase in airborne radioactivity within the reactor building. The reactor remained operating, while attempts were made to determine the source of the radioactivity. Airborne radioactivity then returned to normal.

On July 13, the reactor experienced a series of temperature and radiation fluctuations (known as "excursions", because they were an unexpected departure from expected conditions). The power level rose from about 4 MW to about 14 MW (70% of full power) over a period of about two minutes. The excursion required the operators to manually override a malfunctioning automatic-control switch, and the reactor was shut down. The switch was repaired, and the reactor was slowly restarted. The following day, monitors again indicated elevated airborne radioactivity levels within the reactor building. The source was traced to two locations at the reactor core loading face, which were sealed. Airborne radioactivity within the reactor building was reduced. The reactor was restarted, but the operators noted unusual behavior over the next few days. The reactor increased power faster than expected, and the temperature difference between the reactor bottom (where the sodium entered) and the reactor top (where the sodium exited) was unusually high. Radioactivity within the reactor also increased. The operators investigated, performing several exercises to understand and correct the reactor behavior.

On July 23, it was decided to shut the reactor down because of high fuel temperature and an unacceptable top-bottom reactor temperature differential. While moving the elements to dislodge foreign material (and lower the exit temperatures), it was noticed that four reactor elements were stuck. On July 26 the reactor was shut down, and the first damaged fuel element was observed.

On July 29, 1959, an ad hoc investigative committee was established to study the incident and make recommendations. On August 21, 1959, The Van Nuys News published a story with the headline “Parted Fuel Element seen at Atomics International”. The article stated, “…a parted fuel element was observed” and “The fuel element damage is not an indication of unsafe reactor conditions. No release of radioactive materials to the plant or its environs occurred”. The investigative committee released “SRE Fuel Element Damage, An Interim Report” on November 15, 1959; the final report was made in 1961. The introductory material in both documents includes the statement, ”This report has been distributed according to the category ‘Reactors-Power’ as given in Standard Distribution Lists for Unclassified Scientific and Technical Reports", also noting that a total of 700 copies were printed. The documents were not labeled “secret”.

== Radioactivity release ==
The Sodium Reactor Experiment core, high bay, reactor gas and exhaust stack were routinely monitored with particle detectors. Monitoring was underway at the time of the incident. Two sets of documentation appear to exist concerning the release of radioactive gases in the 1959 incident. The first set of documents include incident reports, technical analysis and radiation monitoring reports prepared by Atomics International personnel shortly after the incident. The second set of documents was primarily prepared to support a defense against a lawsuit against the current property owner (Boeing) about 45 years after the incident.

Following the incident, Atomics International personnel documented an analysis of the distribution of radioactive materials released into the reactor by the damaged fuel elements. The analysis reviewed the radioactive materials released into the sodium and cover gas above the reactor. The researchers determined the amount of radioactive materials released into the sodium, and noted the materials were removed with cold traps; the sodium was reused when the reactor returned to service. The document states that only radioactive xenon-133 and krypton-85 were found in the cover gas. Attempts to detect radioactive iodine-131 were unsuccessful; this was not explained by Atomics International at the time. Internal Atomics International memoranda show the gases were removed from the reactor following the incident and stored in tanks, where they were allowed to decay and then slowly released into the atmosphere.

A summary of radioactive gases released from the Sodium Reactor Experiment over a two-month period was prepared by Boeing. The document notes that 28 curies of fission gases were released into the environment through a stack, in a controlled manner which met federal requirements. Other expert estimates indicate that the available documentation does not resolve the uncertainties about how fission gases were released following the accident, and that the total amount of radioactivity released could be higher.

== Controversy ==
Following the original July 1959 incident, it was next referenced in a 1976 report on nuclear activity in Los Angeles in a little-noticed publication by Another Mother For Peace. The Three Mile Island accident sparked interest by students and faculty member Daniel Hirsch at University of California Los Angeles, who acquired the extensive collection of documentation and film footage of the damaged reactor. The documents and film were supplied to local media, triggering extensive coverage.

In December 2003, the United States Environmental Protection Agency (EPA) completed an evaluation of the portion of the Santa Susana Field Laboratory previously involved with nuclear reactor development (including the Sodium Reactor Experiment site). The evaluation was based on data which included any remaining radiological impacts on water and soils in the area from the Sodium Reactor Experiment. The EPA determined, “the site is not eligible for inclusion on Superfund’s National Priorities List and no further Superfund response is warranted at this time”.

In February 2004 a class action lawsuit was filed against the landowner, Boeing, alleging (in part) that the Sodium Reactor Experiment caused harm to nearby residents. The plaintiffs produced an analysis of the incident prepared by expert witness Arjun Makhijani, who is the head of an anti-nuclear organization. Makhijani's analysis of the Sodium Reactor Experiment estimated the incident at the Sodium Reactor Experiment may have released up to 260 times more radioactive iodine-131 than the official estimates for the Three Mile Island Nuclear Generating Station release. The "260 times worse than Three Mile Island" assertion has been widely quoted. The "Three Mile Island" conclusion presented in the legal filing did not agree with data and documents prepared at the time of the SRE incident.

In August 2004 ground water under the former Sodium Reactor Experiment was sampled to determine the presence of tritium, which was undetected. The results were presented at a DOE-sponsored community meeting in June 2005 and in handouts at the meeting.

In May 2005 a response to the Makhijani analysis was prepared for the defense by Jerry Christian, who provided a technical analysis disputing Makhijani’s claim of iodine release following the incident. Christian noted that Atomics International personnel attempted to monitor iodine-131 without success, and reactor temperature conditions did not permit a significant formation of iodine. A more-detailed analysis was prepared for the plaintiffs by John A. Daniel. Daniel focused on evaluating plant conditions, radiation monitoring and documentation to determine the amount of radioactivity released. His analysis concluded that a smaller amount of radioactive gases were released from the SRE. Christian and Daniel's technical analyses contrasted with that prepared by Makhihjani. The case was settled, reportedly with a large payment by Boeing to the plaintiffs (residents near the Santa Susana Field Laboratory who had cancer and other injuries from past site activities, including the SRE incident).

In July 2006, the History Channel broadcast a video summary of the 1959 Sodium Reactor Experiment incident during episode 19 of the Engineering Disasters documentary series. The segment features quotes from Dan Hirsch, a nuclear policy analyst, and David Lochbaum. The segment alleged that the incident was kept secret for 20 years, and the radioactivity release from the incident may have been as high as 240 times the radioactivity released from the accident at the Three Mile Island Nuclear Generating Station. The Engineering Disasters segment did not mention the technical analyses prepared for Boeing.

In October 2006 California legislators, responding to community calls for independent health studies in the wake of revelations about the site, established the Santa Susana Field Laboratory Advisory Panel. The panel consisted of independent experts from around the country (and one from Britain) and community representatives. It was a project of the Tides Center, funded by the US Department of Energy and later by the California Environmental Protection Agency (as mandated by the California State Legislature). The panel released a set of documents analyzing events at the Santa Susana Field Laboratory. Five reports by consultants focused on the analysis of the radiological impacts of the July 1959 Sodium Reactor Experiment incident. One, by David Lochbaum, concluded that contrary to Rocketdyne's claim that no radioactivity was released into the environment, "as much as 30% of the most worrisome of the radionuclides, iodine-131 and caesium-137, may have been released, with a best estimate of 15% of each". Scant and disconnected data prevented a quantitative assessment of exactly what gases escaped and when. In another report, Jan Beya attempted to provide an exposure estimate to epidemiologists interested in evaluating the effectiveness of radiation-induced-disease studies around the Santa Susana Field Laboratory. Beya noted that some meteorological information was withheld by the plant owner (Boeing). The estimates in the report were limited to scoping calculations with a wide range of uncertainty, but represented the current state of knowledge about the accident and its consequences according to experts who have analyzed the event.

In September 2008, Daniel Hirsch presented testimony in the U.S. Senate to the Committee on Environment and Public Works, chaired by California senator Barbara Boxer. Hirsch called the July 1959 event “one of the worst nuclear accidents in nuclear history” and testified that the government “covered up the seriousness of the accident”. A contrasting viewpoint, based on the technical analysis prepared for Boeing, was not presented at the hearing.

In April 2009, the Department of Energy announced the transfer of $38.3 million to the EPA for a complete radiological survey of a 290-acre (1.2 km^{2}) area of the Santa Susana Field Laboratory. The source of the funds was the American Recovery and Reinvestment Act of 2009. The DOE had provided funds earlier to the EPA for a portion of the survey, so the total funding provided for the Area IV survey is $41.5 million. The survey was scheduled to be completed in September 2011. In December 2012, the EPA released the results of testing done at the site. The Agency noted that it took 3735 soil samples during the study and of those samples more than 10% contained radioactivity higher than background level.

In July 2009, local media recognized the 50th anniversary of the July 1959 SRE incident. Local media reported that a former employee, John Pace, "broke his 50-year vow of secrecy" to describe his role in the reactor incident and recovery. A local newspaper featured photographs of Pace conducting activities at the SRE (monitoring the reactor, turning the top of the reactor core, placing sealer on asbestos piping, and seated at a console operating the reactor). The claim of secrecy contrasts with a press release, a motion picture and reports to the public following the 1959 incident. Jan Beyea was interviewed by a local newspaper; he reaffirmed his assertion that iodine-131 was released during the SRE incident, but it would "probably" not have produced a widespread effect on health.

In August 2009, the Department of Energy (DOE) hosted a public workshop in Simi Valley to explore expert and community perspectives on what occurred before, during and immediately after the July 1959 SRE incident. The workshop featured presentations from three experts: Paul Pickard of DOE's Sandia National Laboratories, Thomas Cochran of the Natural Resources Defense Council and Richard Denning of Ohio State University. Over 185 community members and Atomics International retirees attended the workshop. Posters (depicting key operation and accident timelines) and an evaluation of the reactor's radioactive material inventory and release into the environment were discussed. An electronic library of over 80 technical documents describing the design, operation, the 1959 incident and the activities taken to repair and restart the SRE is maintained by the DOE. Videos of the introductions, presentations, community comments and the question-and-answer session are available for viewing.

== Aftermath ==
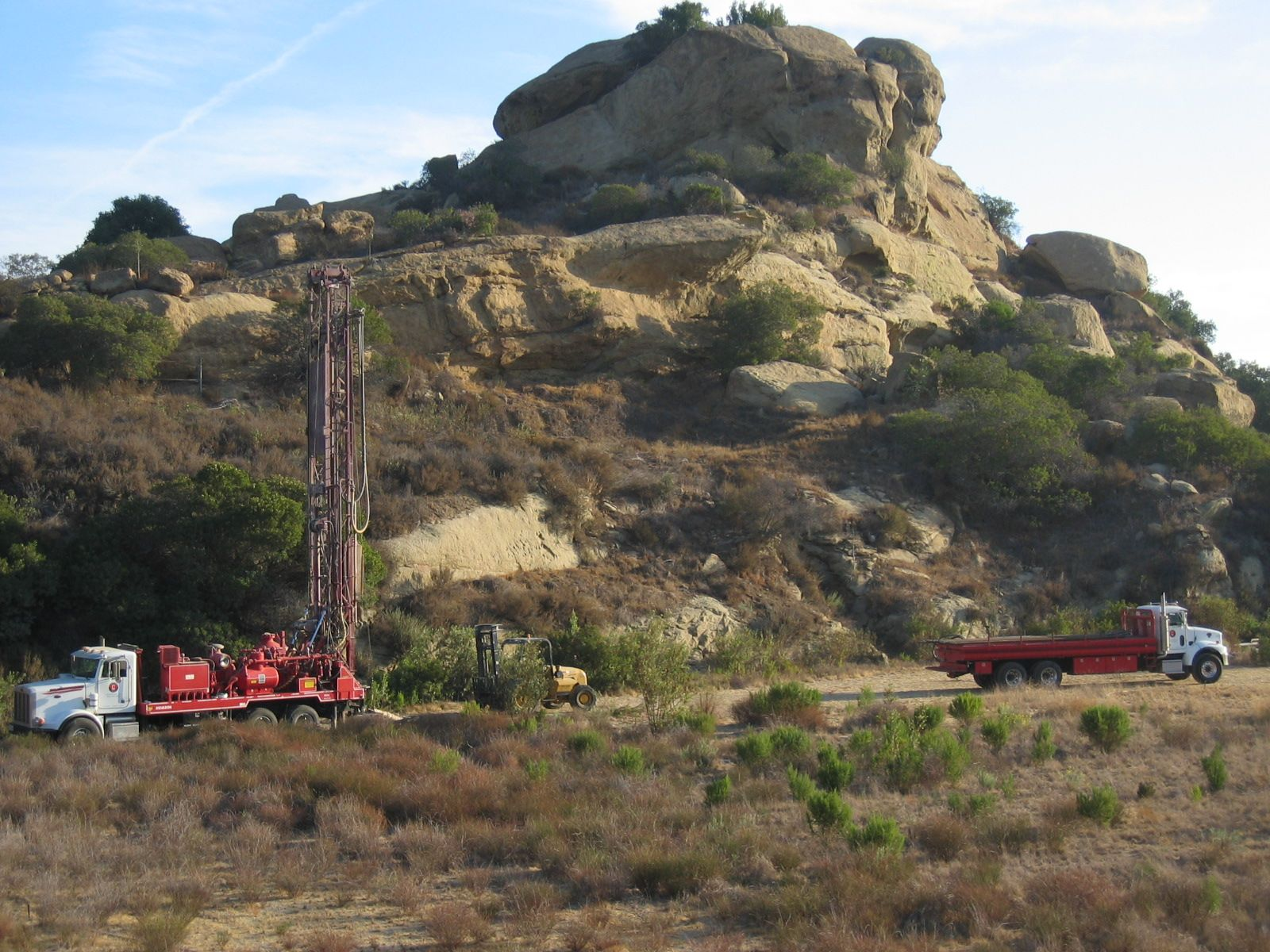
August 2004 sampling for tritium at the former Sodium Reactor Experiment facility site

As a result of the incident, changes were made to the Sodium Reactor Experiment. Tetralin was eliminated, the sodium system was modified, the wash-cell cleaning process used steam instead of water, instrumentation was improved and the fuel-element geometry was modified. In September 1960, following recovery and cleanup operations, the Sodium Reactor Experiment began operation with a new reactor core. At the time of the July 1959 incident, the Sodium Reactor Experiment had operated for 10,344 hours. After the repairs were made and a new core loaded, the Sodium Reactor Experiment operated for an additional 26,716 hours and generated a total of 37 GWh of electricity.

In 1966, the Energy Technology Engineering Center was established at the Santa Susana Field Laboratory by the U.S. Atomic Energy Commission for the development and non-nuclear testing of liquid metal reactor components. The testing and development notably improved the safety and reliability of sodium pump seals. The Energy Technology Engineering Center designed, developed and performed full-scale testing for a wide variety of sodium components (such as cold traps, flow meters and valves) from 1965 to 1998.
