= Van Till =

Van Till or Van Til is a surname. Notable people with the surname include:

- Celine van Till (born 1991), Swiss para-athlete
- Cornelius Van Til (1895–1987), Dutch-American theologian
- Howard J. Van Till (1938–2024), American physicist and academic
- Jon Van Til, American Sociologist

== See also ==
- Till (surname)
