= Hal Morgenstern =

American epidemiologist

- Harold M. Morgenstern
- Born: May 19, 1946 (age 80); Port Jervis, New York
- Education: Massachusetts Institute of Technology, University of North Carolina at Chapel Hill
- Scientific career
- Fields: Epidemiology
- Workplaces: University of Michigan
- Thesis: The changing association between social status and coronary heart disease in a rural population (1978)

Harold "Hal" Morgenstern is an American epidemiologist and professor of epidemiology at the University of Michigan in Ann Arbor.

== Education ==
Morgenstern received his Bachelor of Architecture from the Massachusetts Institute of Technology in 1969. He then attended the University of North Carolina at Chapel Hill, where he received his Master of Regional Planning in 1974 and his Ph.D. in epidemiology in 1978.

== Career ==
Morgenstern joined the faculty of the University of California, Los Angeles in 1985 as an associate professor of epidemiology, and became a full professor there in 1991. In 2003, he joined the faculty of the University of Michigan, originally as the Thomas Francis Jr. Chair of the Department of Epidemiology. He served in this capacity until 2008, and remains a professor of epidemiology there.

== Research ==
Morgenstern is known for studying possible causes of cancer. Specifically, he has researched the possible carcinogenic effects of working at the Santa Susana Field Laboratory in Simi Valley, California, and recreational marijuana use, which he does not think causes cancer.
