= Atomics International =

US nuclear technology company

Atomics International Division North American Aviation
- Type: Division
- Industry: Nuclear energy and related technology
- Founded: 1955; 71 years ago
- Defunct: 1978
- Fate: Merger
- Successor: Energy Systems Group Division of Rockwell International
- Headquarters: Canoga Park, California; 34.229°N 118.714°W
- Key people: Chauncey Starr
- Number of employees: 9,000
- Parent: North American Aviation (1933–1967)

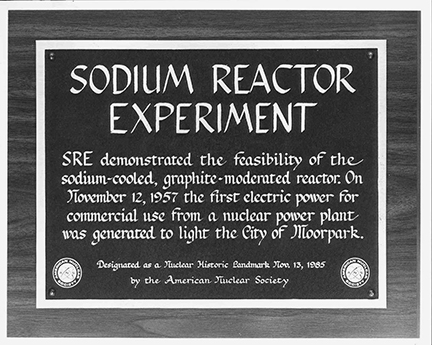
The American Nuclear Society designated the Sodium Reactor Experiment a Nuclear Historical Landmark on November 13, 1985.

Atomics International was a division of the North American Aviation company (later acquired by the Rockwell International company) which engaged principally in the early development of nuclear technology and nuclear reactors for both commercial and government applications. Atomics International was responsible for a number of accomplishments relating to nuclear energy: design, construction and operation of the first nuclear reactor in California (1952), the first nuclear reactor to produce power for a commercial power grid in the United States (1957) and the first nuclear reactor launched into outer space by the United States (1965).

Atomics International undertook the development of nuclear reactors soon after being established: a series of commercial nuclear power reactors beginning with the Sodium Reactor Experiment (SRE) and a range of compact nuclear reactors culminating with the Systems for Auxiliary Nuclear Power SNAP-10A system. Both efforts were successful, despite nuclear accidents at the Santa Susana Field Laboratory, but overall interest in nuclear power steadily declined. The division transitioned to non-nuclear energy-related projects such as coal gasification and gradually ceased designing and testing nuclear reactors. Atomics International was eventually merged with another division (Rocketdyne division) of the same parent company (Rockwell International). As of 2010, all of the Atomics International facilities, except for the few remaining facilities located in the Area IV test area at the Santa Susana Field Laboratory (SSFL), have been demolished, cleaned and reused, or awaiting final cleanup.

== Company history ==
Following World War II, the potential of nuclear power captured the interest of the United States Government and the general public. In 1948, North American Aviation created an internal organization called the Atomic Energy Research Department (AERD) to manage its government and commercial nuclear research and development activities. The Atomic Energy Research Department designed, constructed and operated a 5 watt thermal aqueous homogeneous reactor at Downey, California, which on April 21, 1952, became the first nuclear reactor to operate in the State of California. In 1955, the AERD was renamed the Atomics International division of North American Aviation.

=== SRE – Sodium Reactor Experiment ===
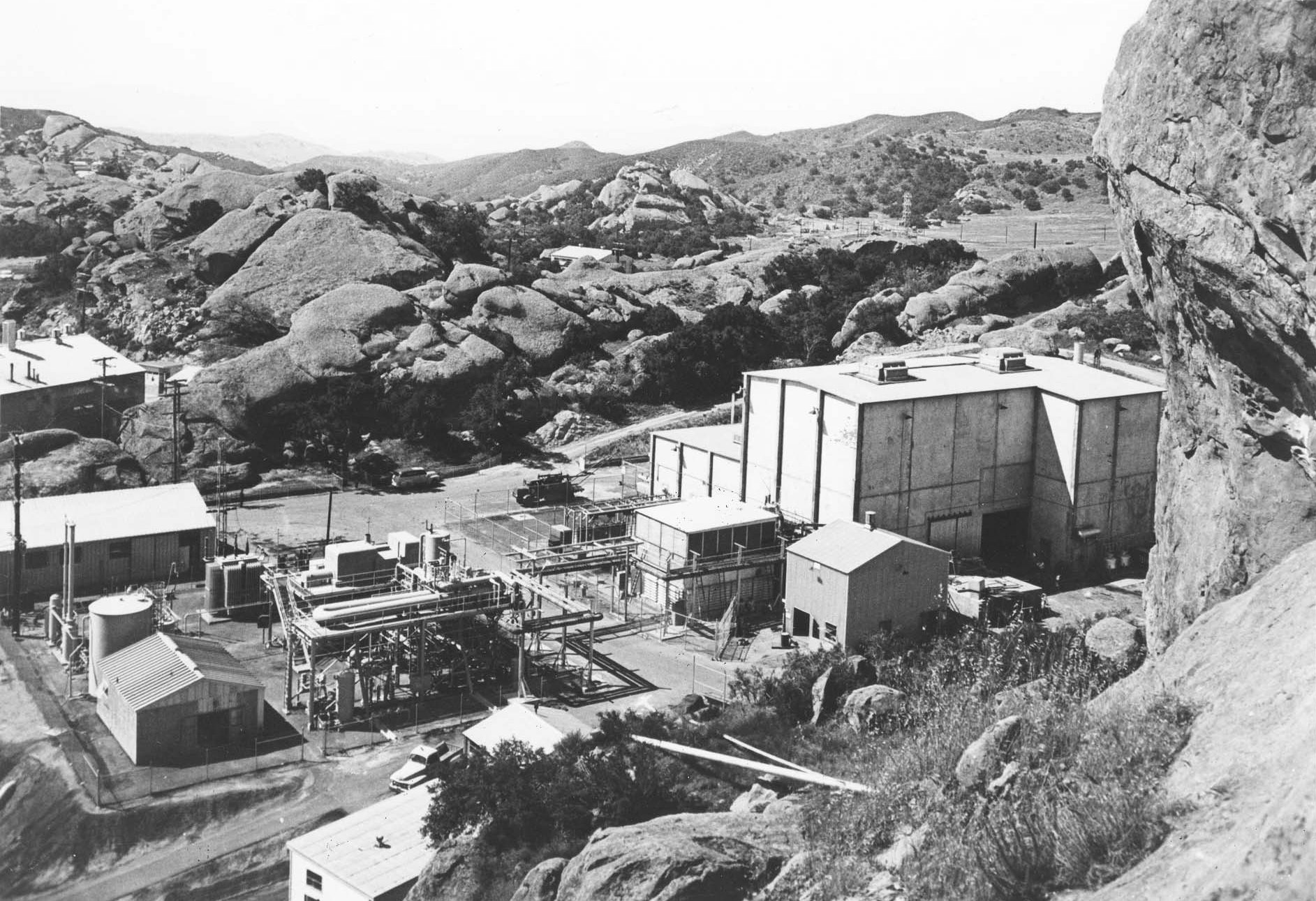
The Sodium Reactor Experiment facility in 1958

The Sodium Reactor Experiment was the result of Atomics International initially focusing on developing and commercializing reactor technology by undertaking the design of a nuclear power reactor capable of producing electricity on a commercial basis. Atomics International decided sodium was a more appropriate nuclear reactor coolant than water. Sodium was chosen because it has excellent heat transfer properties, has a low operating pressure at typical reactor temperatures and it has a relatively low melting point. When used as a coolant for a nuclear reactor, water requires heavy piping since at the high reactor temperatures, water is kept under pressure. In the event of an accident, the sudden breach of the high temperature water system (among other things) necessitates a special containment vessel to capture the released pressure.

Experience gained from conducting basic nuclear technology development provided Atomics International with the experience and practical knowledge necessary for the design, construction and operation of the Sodium Reactor Experiment nuclear reactor. On July 12, 1957, the Sodium Reactor Experiment became the first nuclear reactor in the United States to produce electrical power for a commercial power grid by powering the nearby city of Moorpark. In July 1959 an accident where the narrow internal cooling channels within the reactor fuel assemblies became obstructed by an organic contaminant causing 13 of 43 reactor core fuel elements to partially melt. Atomics International personnel repaired the reactor which was restarted in September, 1960 and operated until 1964. The company subsequently designed and developed a concept demonstration sodium cooled nuclear power unit for the Hallam Nuclear Generating Station in Nebraska and a concept demonstration organic (Santowax) cooled nuclear power unit for the Piqua Nuclear Generating Station, in Ohio as experimental demonstration projects for the Atomic Energy Commission. The Piqua reactor was a 45.5 MWe organically moderated and cooled reactor while Hallam was a liquid metal cooled reactor using metallic sodium with graphite as the moderator. Both Hallam and Piqua were beset by technical problems and operated only a few years before being permanently shut down.

=== SNAP – Systems for Nuclear Auxiliary Power ===
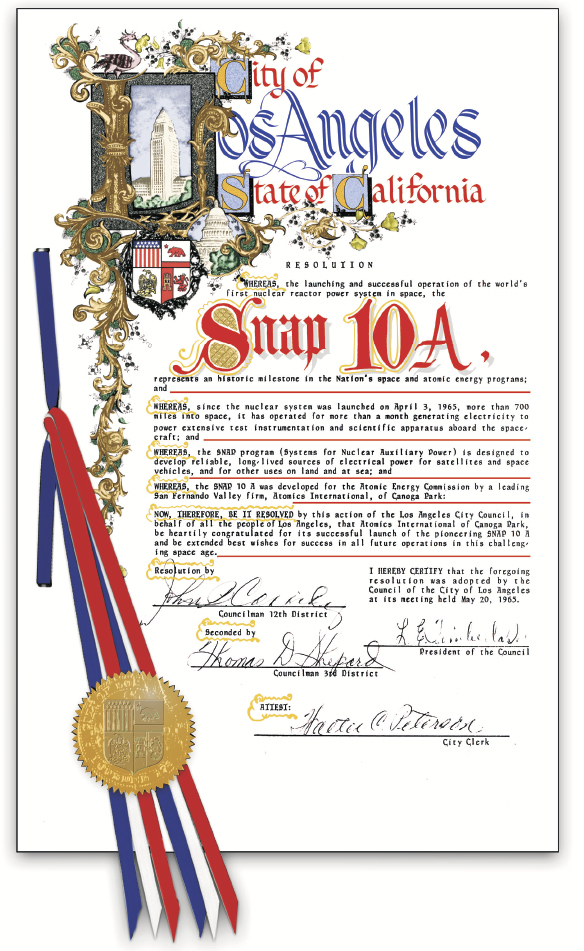
On May 20, 1965, the City of Los Angeles recognized Atomics International on the occasion of the successful SNAP-10A mission.

Development of a compact nuclear reactor for the Systems for Nuclear Auxiliary Power (SNAP) program largely coincided with Atomic International's Sodium Reactor Experiment effort. In the mid-1950s, Atomics International was chosen as the prime contractor to the U.S. Government for the development of the compact SNAP nuclear reactor. The number of specialized facilities located at the Santa Susana Field Laboratory rapidly increased. Following the successful 1965 launch of the SNAP 10A reactor, the U.S. Government canceled the program leaving a number of government–owned facilities at the site. In 1966, the Liquid Metal Information Center (later renamed the Energy Technology Engineering Center) was established by the U. S. Department of Energy as their center of liquid metal-related research. The ETEC reused many of the buildings formerly used in the SNAP program.

=== Other nuclear energy projects ===
Atomics International also engaged in a number of commercial projects. Atomics International built and operated the Atomics International Hot Lab (later renamed the Rockwell International Hot Lab) at the Santa Susana Field Laboratory. This facility performed the disassembly of fuel rods to support the on-site research and development of the SNAP reactors and for the decladding of nuclear fuel rods from off-site commercial nuclear reactors. Atomics International also developed a coal gasification process using molten salt technology.

As time passed, nuclear research and development activities steadily declined. As a result of this decline, Atomics International was organizationally combined with other Rockwell International operations to become the Energy Systems Group in 1978. Atomics International ceased as an autonomous business division, however, their remaining business activities were performed as the Atomics International division of Energy Systems Group, Rockwell International.

The remaining Atomics International business operations were merged into the Rocketdyne division of Rockwell International in 1984 when the Energy Systems Group was ended. Nuclear research programs and operations ceased in 1989 and all non-nuclear research ended in 1998. Rockwell International sold the Rocketdyne division to The Boeing Company in 1996. In 2005, Boeing sold Rocketdyne to United Technologies Corporation who combined it with an existing division and renamed them Pratt & Whitney Rocketdyne. Boeing retained ownership of the Santa Susana Field Laboratory property, including Area IV, with its environmental cleanup responsibilities. The Hamilton Sundstrand division of United Technologies Corporation became the recipient of the remaining technical knowledge from the Atomics International nuclear-related activities.

== Facilities and operations ==
Atomics International has its beginnings in Downey then moved to several locations in the western end of California's San Fernando Valley in Canoga Park. Since all of the Atomics International facilities involved radioactive materials to some extent, documentation is available regarding the historical operations at each site.

=== Downey Facility ===
The Atomic Energy Research Development Group began operations in the North American Aviation plant located on Lakewood Drive in Downey, California. They performed basic research and constructed at least one aqueous homogeneous reactor named the Water Boiler Neutron Source. The four watt reactor was shut down and moved to the Santa Susana Field Laboratory in December 1955. The reactor-related facilities were examined and determined to be free of residual radioactivity and reused as general office space. The Downey facility was transferred to the City of Downey and the buildings subsequently demolished and replaced with a variety of commercial buildings.

=== Vanowen Boulevard Facility ===
Atomics International occupied a building at the corner of Owensmouth Avenue and Vanowen Street in Canoga Park, California, adjacent to the Rocketdyne Canoga facility. Principal work performed at the Vanowen facility included fuel development for the SNAP program, and radiochemistry. The site also supported the design, development and operation of two small aqueous homogeneous reactors, the 5 watt L-47 reactor and the ten watt L-77 reactor. By 1960, both reactors were closed and the radioactive materials removed from the site. Atomics International moved to their new DeSoto Avenue headquarters and Rocketdyne assumed the control of the Vanowen building. The Vanowen building was demolished in 2007.

=== De Soto Avenue Facility ===
In 1959, Atomics International established their headquarters at a complex of buildings located along De Soto Avenue in Canoga Park, California. The De Soto facility hosted the operation of a ten watt L-77 aqueous homogeneous reactor, nuclear reactor fuel fabrication, a gamma irradiation facility, and a radiochemistry laboratory. All of the operations involving radioactive materials were removed by the mid-1990s. The property is now owned and operated by Aerojet Rocketdyne.

=== Thompson-Ramo-Wooldridge Facility ===
Space was leased from Thompson-Ramo-Wooldridge Inc, renamed TRW in 1965, for nuclear research projects. It was located at Fallbrook Avenue and Roscoe Boulevard in Canoga Park (present day West Hills).

=== Santa Susana Field Laboratory (SSFL), Area IV Facility ===
From 1953 to 1989, three primary types of operations were conducted in the Ventura County Simi Hills at Santa Susana Field Laboratory (SSFL) Area IV: Development and testing of nuclear reactors, nuclear support operations, and non-nuclear energy research and development at the Energy Technology Engineering Center.

The research operations conducted by Atomics International are known to have caused some degree of chemical and radiological contamination to Area IV. The U.S. Department of Energy has accepted responsibility for the cleanup of both chemical and radiological impacts within Area IV under the 2010 Administrative Order on Consent (AOC). The AOC requires the DOE to clean up both chemical and radiological contaminants to background concentrations within the underlying soils of the 290-acre Area IV. In May 2009, the US Environmental Protection Agency began a $41.5 million survey to determine the nature and extent of any radiological contamination within Area IV.

==== Development and testing of nuclear reactors ====
Between 1954 and 1980 at the Santa Susana Field Laboratory several nuclear reactors were built, tested and operated in Area IV. These included both nuclear reactors and critical test assemblies. A critical test assembly is a very low-power reactor that does not require an active cooling system and frequently requires a separate neutron source to maintain critical neutron flux.

- Advanced Epithermal Thorium Reactor
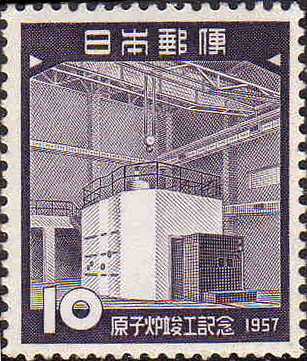
  In 1957, Japan issued this stamp commemorating the completion of their first nuclear reactor. Translation: "The establishment of the first reactor in Japan – 1957".

The Advanced Epithermal Thorium Reactor was built for the Southwest Atomic Power Association at Building 100 in 1960. The AETR was used to test twenty different reactor core configurations by using an apparatus which supported a range of geometries. The AETR program was terminated in 1972.

- Homogeneous Water Boiler-type Reactors

Atomics International designed and built a range of low-power (5 to 50,000 watts thermal) nuclear reactors for research, training and isotope production purposes. This aqueous homogeneous reactor type of low-power nuclear reactor used a 93% enriched uranyl sulphate solution held in a critical configuration in a spherical vessel. Reactivity was controlled using an arrangement of control rods within tubes penetrating the reactor vessel. The solution did not boil; rather, neutron and gamma flux caused radiolytic decomposition of water into hydrogen and oxygen in the form of tiny bubbles that gave the impression of boiling. One reactor model, the L-54, was purchased and installed by a number of United States universities and foreign research institutions, including Japan. The Japanese Atomic Research Institute renamed theirs Japan Research Reactor-1 (JRR-1) and the government of Japan issued a commemorative postage stamp noting the establishment of Japan's first nuclear reactor in 1957. The reactor was decommissioned in 1970 and is now maintained as a a museum exhibit with a Japanese-language website at Tokaimura, Japan

- Sodium Reactor Experiment (SRE) program

The Sodium Reactor Experiment (SRE) was an experimental nuclear reactor which operated from 1957 to 1964. On July 12, 1957, its electrical generating system produced the first electricity generated from a nuclear power system to supply a commercial power grid in the United States by powering homes in the nearby city of Moorpark. In July 1959, the narrow internal cooling channels within the reactor fuel rod assemblies became obstructed by an unintended byproduct-produced organic contaminant, causing 13 of 43 reactor fuel elements to partially melt in an incident. Atomics International personnel repaired the reactor, which was restarted in September 1960 and operated with minor incidents until 1964.

- Systems for Nuclear Auxiliary Power (SNAP) program

The objective of the Systems for Nuclear Auxiliary Power program undertaken in 1955 by the United States was the development of compact, lightweight, reliable atomic electric devices for space, land and sea. The Atomic Energy Commission – AEC (predecessor to the Department of Energy – DOE), was the procurement agency for the Department of Defense (DOD) and National Aeronautics and Space Administration – NASA requirements. The AEC was responsible for developing technologies that would allow the requirement to be fulfilled and for carrying out the initial phases of operational tests. From the period 1955 to 1973 when the program was terminated, approximately $850 million then-years dollars were spent by the United States to develop the SNAP nuclear reactors.

Atomics International was the prime contractor to the AEC for the development of the SNAP reactors. In the late 1950s to the early 1960s, Atomics International established a number of government-owned facilities to support the SNAP program at the Energy Technology Engineering Center (ETEC) in Area IV of the Santa Susana Field Laboratory (SSFL). The SNAP-10A was the only nuclear reactor launched and flight tested by the United States. The City of Los Angeles issued a proclamation to recognize the accomplishment. The facilities included underground test facilities to test the compact SNAP nuclear reactors, non-nuclear test and support buildings, and administrative offices. Atomics International developed and tested five different SNAP reactors under the Systems for Nuclear Auxiliary Power Program.

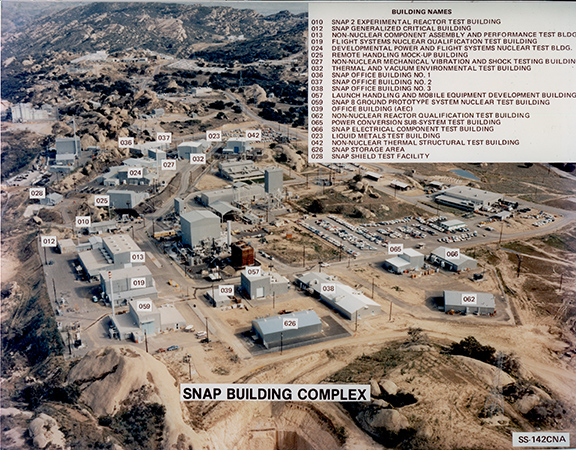
A number of specialized facilities were constructed to support SNAP reactor testing and development at ETEC, in Area IV of the Santa Susana Field Laboratory (SSFL), in the Simi Hills.

SNAP nuclear reactors tested at Santa Susana Field Laboratory, Area IV. (Adapted from Sapere and Boeing, 2005 and Voss, 1984)
Designation	Name	Date	Power (kWth)	SSFL building number
SER	SNAP Experimental Reactor	Sep 1959 – Dec 60	50	010
SDR a.k.a. S2DR	SNAP (2) Developmental Reactor	Apr 61 – Dec 62	65	024
S8ER	SNAP 8 Experimental Reactor	May 63 – Apr 65	600	010
SNAP 10A FS-3	Duplicate of launched SNAP 10A FS-4	Jan 65 – Mar 66	38	024
S8DR	SNAP 8 Developmental Reactor	Jun 68 –Dec 69	600/1000	059

- Nuclear support operations

At the Santa Susana Field Laboratory, approximately twenty facilities were designed and built in Area IV to manage radioactive materials in support of the nuclear reactor programs. These operations included fuel fabrication, storage and reprocessing, radioactive measurement and calibration and radioactive waste management and disposal preparation. As of January 2010, only the Radioactive Materials Handling Facility remains in operation in support of the DOE's cleanup effort.

==== ETEC – Energy Technology Engineering Center ====
The Energy Technology Engineering Center (ETEC) specialized in the non-nuclear testing of components which were primarily designed to transfer heat from a nuclear reactor using liquid metals instead of water or gas. Atomics International operated the ETEC as a separate division at SSFL under contract to the U.S. Department of Energy. The ETEC operated from 1966 to 1998.

== Ownership and licensing ==
Atomics International was a division of a private company which engaged in the commercial enterprise of selling products and services to other companies, Universities and foreign governments. Atomics International also conducted research and development for the United States Government. Operating both as a contractor to the U.S. Government and as a commercial company, Atomics International maintained authorizations allowing for the use of radioactive materials in either situation. Activities using radioactive materials owned by the Department of Energy were supervised by that government agency and no licensing was required. For facilities such as the DeSoto, Vanowen operated under a permit to operate granted and monitored by the Nuclear Regulatory Commission or the California State Department of Health Services, Radiological Health Branch. Four buildings at SSFL were licensed by the NRC: Rockwell International Hot Lab (4020), The L-85 reactor building (4093), Nuclear Materials Development Facility (4055), and the Fast Critical Experiment Laboratory (4100). Personnel radiation exposure limitations were generally lower for those working in facilities licensed by the NRC as opposed to sites overseen by the DOE and operating personnel frequently rotated between the facilities.

== See also ==
- Santa Susana Field Laboratory (SSFL)
- California Department of Toxic Substances Control (DTSC)

== Additional information ==
- The DOE's former Energy Technology Engineering Center Project website provides extensive historical and current site cleanup information.

as do

- The California Department of Toxic Substances Control SSFL Site Investigation and Cleanup website.
- A review of the Nuclear-related activities conducted in SSLF Area IV can be accessed using an interactive graphic.
- A general operational history and detailed individual histories for each SSFL Area IV building can be found in the 2005 Historical Site Assessment document.
- The US Environmental Protection Agency also produced a Historical Site Assessment for SSFL Area IV.
