= John E. Till =

American nuclear scientist and naval flag officer

John Earl Till PhD; RADM, USNR, Ret.
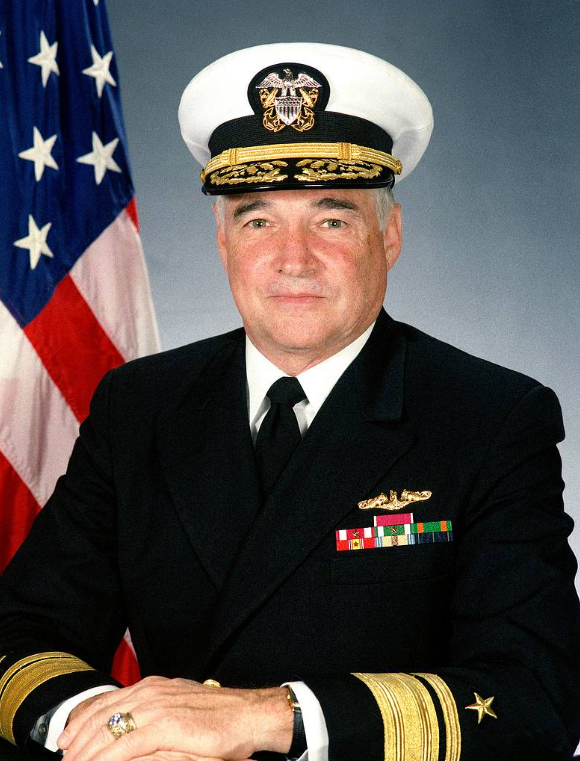
- Born: January 26, 1945; Orangeburg, South Carolina
- Education: United States Naval Academy (BS, 1967); Colorado State University (MS, 1972); Georgia Institute of Technology (PhD, 1976)
- Known for: Radiological risk assessment and environmental analysis
- Scientific career
- Awards: Health Physics Society Elda E Anderson Award [E.O. Lawrence Award] L.S. Taylor Medal; Health Physics Society's Distinguished Scientific Achievement Award
- Fields: Nuclear science
- Thesis: The Toxicity of Uranium and Plutonium to the Developing Embryos of Fish (1976)
- Doctoral advisor: Geoffrey G. Eichholz, Ph.D.
- Other academic advisors: Bernd Kahn, Ph.D.; Karl Z. Morgan, Ph.D.; C.J. Roberts, Ph.D.
John E. Till
- Military career
- Branch: United States Navy; United States Naval Reserve
- Service years: 1967–1999
- Rank: Rear admiral (O‑8)
- Commands: Commanded seven Selected Reserve units; Commander, Region 10, Naval Reserve Readiness Command; Deputy commander, Submarine Force U.S. Atlantic Fleet; Deputy commander, United States Strategic Command
- Awards: Officers' Submarine Warfare Insignia; Defense Distinguished Service Medal; Legion of Merit; Meritorious Service Medal (2); Navy Commendation Medal (2); Navy Achievement Medal

John E. Till is an American nuclear scientist who worked on the risk of exposure to radioactive materials released to the environment from nuclear facilities and is a Doctor of Philosophy (PhD) in nuclear engineering. Till also served as a commissioned officer in the United States Navy, both on active duty and in the United States Naval Reserve, retiring from the Reserve as rear admiral (a two-star flag officer). Till is the president of Risk Assessment Corporation and Embeford Farm of SC, LLC.

== Early life and education ==
John Till attended primary and secondary school in East Point, Georgia, a suburb of Atlanta. During the summers of his childhood, he worked with his three uncles and grandfather on their dairy farm near Orangeburg, South Carolina.

Till graduated from the US Naval Academy in 1967. Following his active-duty service, he received his M.S. degree in radiation biology and health physics from Colorado State University in 1972. He earned his Ph.D. in nuclear engineering from the Georgia Institute of Technology in 1976 while also working on the staff of the Health and Safety Research Division at the Oak Ridge National Laboratory (ORNL). His doctoral research at Oak Ridge focused on the impact of highly toxic isotopes of uranium-232, uranium-238, plutonium-238, and plutonium-244 in the aquatic environment in support of advanced nuclear reactor fuels.

== Scientific career ==
Following the death of two uncles on the farm in 1977, Till moved back to his family's 1100-acre dairy farm in South Carolina to prevent the farm's sale and to carry on its heritage.

He founded Risk Assessment Corporation, a privately owned business that enabled him to pursue his scientific interests in radiological risk assessment while operating the farm. Leading RAC, he worked on mathematical modeling of radioactive materials in the environment and their dose to humans and the communication of risk.

In 1983 he and his co-editor H. Robert Meyer published the anthology Radiological Assessment, A Textbook on Environmental Dose Analysis. Twenty-five years later a revised and updated version was published, this time edited by Till and Helen A. Grogan and titled Radiological Risk Assessment and Environmental Analysis. A reviewer described it as a revision as "based on many years of experience by acknowledged experts in their fields", and noted that it would serve both as a textbook for students and a reference for practitioners.

The textbook and technical methods of application were applied to events such as Three Mile Island and Chernobyl.

Historical radiation dose reconstruction on sites with past radioactive contamination is one of Till's specialties. He directed the historical dose reconstruction for the Hanford Site in Washington State, and created a blueprint for major studies of Department of Energy sites.

He was the principal investigator for the first study of America’s Atomic Veterans. He was the principal investigator in historical dose reconstruction studies for the Nevada Test Site, the Rocky Flats Site, the Fernald Feed Materials Facility, the Savannah River Site, the Apollo Uranium Processing Facility, the Cerro Grande Fire at the Los Alamos National Laboratory, and the Woolsey Fire at Santa Susana Field Laboratory. Till's research on these and other facilities and accidents involving the release of radioactive materials to the environment spans 50 years and has been used as a model both in the US and internationally.

== Naval career ==
Following U.S. Navy nuclear power training and the Submarine Officer Basic Course, Till served aboard the USS Guardfish (SSN 612) where he qualified in submarines. He continued his navy career in the United States Naval Reserve retiring as a two-star admiral (O-8) in 1999. As a reserve flag officer, he served as Chairman on the National Navy Reserve Policy Board. He is the recipient of the Department of Defense Distinguished Service Medal, the Legion of Merit, Navy Meritorious Service Medal (two awards), Commendation Medal (two awards), and the Navy Achievement Medal.

== Civilian awards ==
- In 1983 he received the Health Physics Society Elda E Anderson Award.
- He was awarded the E. O. Lawrence Award in 1994.
- In 2013, he received the L.S. Taylor Medal and presented the Taylor Lecture at the annual meeting of the National Council on Radiation Protection and Measurements.
- In 2020, he received the Health Physics Society's Distinguished Scientific Achievement Award for development of scientific knowledge for the protection of humankind and the environment.
- In 2024, he and his colleagues received the Editorial Board of the Health Physics Journal "Paper of the Year" award.
