= Louisa Till =

Louisa Till (née Middleton) was an English American marionettist and entertainer active in the late 19th and early 20th centuries.

== Life ==
She was born in London, England in 1853 and died in Malden, Massachusetts in 1913.

As a member of the Middleton family, Louisa Till began performing with Middleton's Royal Marionette Company, which John McCormick describes in The Victorian Marionette Theatre as "central" to any academic discussion of 19th-century marionette theater.

Louisa Middleton became Louisa Till upon her marriage to John Coates Till, an English American marionettist and performer who had worked with her family.

According to McCormick, John Coates Till traveled to America with William John Bullock's company around 1874, subsequently working with Middleton's Royal Marionette Company before establishing himself as an independent performer and maker of marionettes for sale.

== Career ==
Advertisements, articles, and reviews from the late 19th through early 20th centuries describe the Tills as acclaimed marionettists and entertainers who traveled widely throughout the United States and Canada performing original shows with their marionettes and automatons. The Tills often traveled with variety shows, such as Hyde & Behman's Specialty Company, working in conjunction with other notable performers of the period.

== Legacy ==
Till's style of performance is credited as a strong influence on vaudeville circuits shows. Recent scholarship, the Tills' on the minstrel marionette show has been examined for its racially charged depictions of African Americans in the Reconstruction Era.
