= Santa Susana Field Laboratory =

Industrial research and development facilities in California

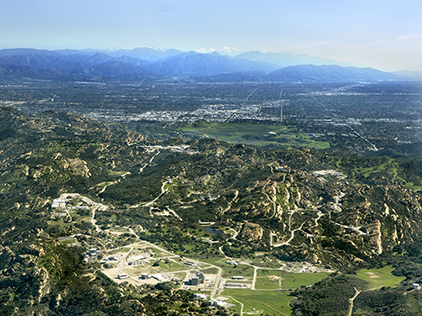
- Aerial view of the Santa Susana Field Laboratory, 2005

Agency overview
- Formed: 1948; 78 years ago
- Dissolved: 2006; 20 years ago
- Jurisdiction: Federal government of the United States
- Headquarters: Ventura County, California, United States; 34°13′51″N 118°41′47″W
- Parent agency: NASA / Boeing / Department of Energy
- Website: ssfl.msfc.nasa.gov

The Santa Susana Field Laboratory (SSFL), formerly known as Rocketdyne, is a complex of former industrial research and development facilities located on a 2,668-acre (1,080 ha) portion of Southern California in an unincorporated area of Ventura County in the Simi Hills between Simi Valley and Los Angeles. The site is located approximately 18 miles (29 km) northwest of Hollywood and approximately 30 miles (48 km) northwest of Downtown Los Angeles. Sage Ranch Park is adjacent on part of the northern boundary and the community of Bell Canyon is along the entire southern boundary.

SSFL was used mainly for the development and testing of liquid-propellant rocket engines for the United States space program from 1949 to 2006, nuclear reactors from 1953 to 1980, and the operation of a U.S. government-sponsored liquid metals research center from 1966 to 1998. Throughout the years, about ten low-power nuclear reactors operated at SSFL (including the Sodium Reactor Experiment, the first reactor in the United States to generate electrical power for a commercial grid, and the first commercial power plant in the world to experience a partial core meltdown), in addition to several "critical facilities" that helped develop nuclear science and applications. At least four of the ten nuclear reactors had accidents during their operation. The reactors located on the grounds of SSFL were considered experimental, and therefore had no containment structures.

The site ceased research and development operations in 2006. The years of rocket testing, nuclear reactor testing, and liquid metal research have left the site "significantly contaminated". Environmental cleanup is ongoing. The public living near the site has strongly urged a thorough cleanup, citing cases of long-term illnesses, including cancer at rates claimed to be higher than normal. Experts have said that there is insufficient evidence to identify an explicit link between cancer rates and radioactive contamination in the area.

== Introduction ==
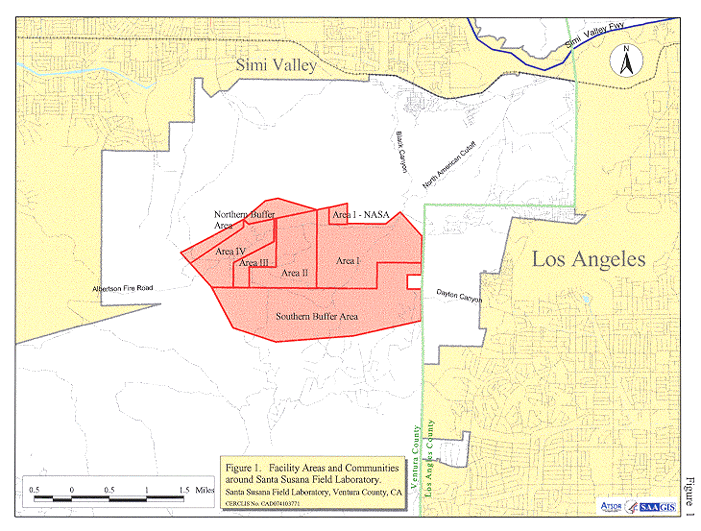
Santa Susana Field Laboratory administrative areas, and the surrounding communities

Since 1947, the Santa Susana Field Laboratory location has been used by a number of companies and agencies. The first was Rocketdyne, originally a division of North American Aviation (NAA), which developed a variety of pioneering, successful, and reliable liquid rocket engines. Some were used in the Navaho cruise missile, the Redstone rocket, the Thor and Jupiter ballistic missiles, early versions of the Delta and Atlas rockets, the Saturn rocket family, and the Space Shuttle Main Engine. The Atomics International division of North American Aviation used a separate and dedicated portion of the Santa Susana Field Laboratory to build and operate the first commercial nuclear power plant in the United States, as well as for the testing and development of compact nuclear reactors, including the first and only known nuclear reactor launched into Low Earth Orbit by the United States, the SNAP-10A. Atomics International also operated the Energy Technology Engineering Center for the U.S. Department of Energy at the site. The Santa Susana Field Laboratory includes sites identified as historic by the American Institute of Aeronautics and Astronautics and by the American Nuclear Society. In 1996, The Boeing Company became the primary owner and operator of the Santa Susana Field Laboratory and later closed the site.

Three California state agencies (Department of Toxic Substances Control, Department of Public Health Radiologic Health Branch, and the Los Angeles Regional Water Quality Control Board) and three federal agencies (Department of Energy, NASA, and EPA) have been overseeing a detailed investigation of environmental impacts from historical site operations since at least 1990. Concerns about the environmental impact of past nuclear energy and rocket test operations, and waste disposal practices, have inspired several lawsuits seeking payments from Boeing. Litigation and legislation have also attempted to change established remediation and decommissioning processes. Several interest groups (Committee to Bridge the Gap, Natural Resource Defense Council, Physicians for Social Responsibility - Los Angeles) and numerous others, are actively involved with steering the ongoing environmental investigation.

The Santa Susana Field Laboratory is the focus of diverse interests. Burro Flats Painted Cave, listed on the National Register of Historic Places, is located within the Santa Susana Field Laboratory boundaries, on a portion of the site owned by the U.S. government. The drawings within the cave have been termed "the best preserved Indian pictograph in Southern California." Several tributary streams to the Los Angeles River have headwater watersheds on the SSFL property, including Bell Creek (90% of SSFL drainage), Dayton Creek, Woolsey Canyon, and Runkle Creek.

== History ==
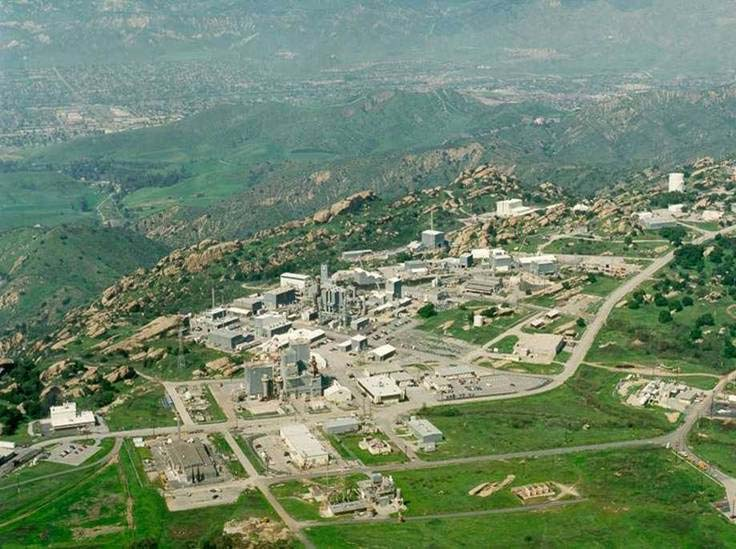
Aerial view looking north, of the Energy Technology Engineering Center in Area IV (1990)

SSFL was a United States government facility dedicated to the development and testing of nuclear reactors, powerful rockets such as the Delta II, and the systems that powered the Apollo missions. The location of SSFL was chosen in 1947 for its remoteness in order to conduct work that was considered too dangerous and too noisy to be performed in more densely populated areas. In subsequent years, the Southern California population grew, along with housing developments surrounding the area.

The site is divided into four production and two buffer areas (Area I, II, III, and IV, and the northern and southern buffer zones). Areas I through III were used for rocket testing, missile testing, and munitions development. Area IV was used primarily for nuclear reactor experimentation and development. Laser research for the Strategic Defense Initiative (popularly known as "Star Wars") was also conducted in Area IV.

=== Rocket engine development ===
Research, development and testing of rocket engines was conducted on a regular basis in Area II of the SSFL from the mid 1950s through the early 1980s. These activities were conducted by the U.S. Army, Air Force, and NASA. Subsequently, occasional testing took place until 2006.

North American Aviation (NAA) began its development of liquid propellant rocket engines after the end of WWII. The Rocketdyne division of NAA, which came into being under its own name in the mid-1950s, designed and tested several rocket engines at the facility. They included engines for the Army's Redstone (an advanced short-range version of the German V-2), and the Army Jupiter intermediate range ballistic missile (IRBM) as well as the Air Force's counterpart IRBM, the Thor. Also included among those developed there, were engines for the Atlas Intercontinental Ballistic Missile (ICBM), as well as the twin combustion chamber alcohol/liquid oxygen booster engine for the Navaho, a large, intercontinental cruise missile that never became operational. Later, Rocketdyne designed and tested the J-2 liquid oxygen/hydrogen engine which was used on the second and third stages of the Saturn V launch rocket developed for the Moon-bound Project Apollo mission. While the J-2 was tested at the facility, Rocketdyne's huge F-1 engine for the first stage of the Saturn V was tested in the Mojave Desert near Edwards Air Force Base. This was due to safety and noise considerations, since SSFL was too close to populated areas.

NASA conducted Space Shuttle main engine tests at SSFL from 1974 to 1988.

=== Nuclear and energy research and development ===
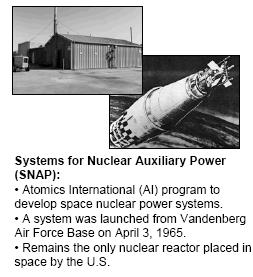
SSFL: the Atomics International Snap reactor

The Atomics International Division of North American Aviation used SSFL Area IV as the site of United States first commercial nuclear power plant and the testing and development of the SNAP-10A, the first nuclear reactor launched into outer space by the United States. Atomics International also operated the Energy Technology Engineering Center at the site for the U.S. government. As overall interest in nuclear power declined, Atomics International made a transition to non-nuclear energy-related projects, such as coal gasification, and gradually, ceased designing and testing nuclear reactors. Atomics International eventually was merged with the Rocketdyne division in 1978.

==== Sodium reactor experiment ====
The Sodium Reactor Experiment (SRE) was an experimental nuclear reactor that operated at the site from 1957 to 1964. In 1959 it became the first commercial power plant in the world to experience a core meltdown. There was a decades-long cover-up of the incident by the U.S. Department of Energy. The operation predated environmental regulation, so early disposal techniques are not recorded in detail. Thousands of pounds of sodium coolant from the time of the meltdown are not yet accounted for.

The reactor and support systems were removed in 1981 and the building torn down in 1999.

The 1959 sodium reactor incident was chronicled on History Channel's program Engineering Disasters 19.

In August 2009, on the 50th anniversary of the SRE accident, the Department of Energy hosted a day-long public workshop for the community, employees, and retirees. The workshop featured three experts – Dr. Paul Pickard of DOE's Sandia National Laboratories, Dr. Thomas Cochran of the Natural Resources Defense Council, and Dr. Richard Denning of Ohio State University – as well as a Q&A and discussion. All three experts agreed that there was not significant public harm from the release of radioactive noble gases, but held conflicting views about the amounts and health harms of other radioactive fission products potentially released.

==== Energy Technology Engineering Center ====
The Energy Technology Engineering Center (ETEC), was a government-owned, contractor-operated complex of industrial facilities located within Area IV of the Santa Susana Field Laboratory. The ETEC specialized in non-nuclear testing of components which were designed to transfer heat from a nuclear reactor using liquid metals instead of water or gas. The center operated from 1966 to 1998. The ETEC site has been closed and is now undergoing building removal and environmental remediation by the U.S. Department of Energy.

== Accidents and site contamination ==
=== Nuclear reactors ===
Throughout the years, approximately ten low-power nuclear reactors operated at SSFL, in addition to several "critical facilities": a sodium burn pit in which sodium-coated objects were burned in an open pit; a plutonium fuel fabrication facility; a uranium carbide fuel fabrication facility; and the purportedly largest "Hot Lab" facility in the United States at the time. (A hot lab is a facility used for remotely handling or machining radioactive material.) Irradiated nuclear fuel from other Atomic Energy Commission (AEC) and Department of Energy (DOE) facilities from around the country was shipped to SSFL to be decladded and examined.

The hot lab suffered a number of fires involving radioactive materials. For example, in 1957, a fire in the hot cell "got out of control and ... massive contamination" resulted.

At least four of the ten nuclear reactors suffered accidents: 1) The AE6 reactor experienced a release of fission gases in March 1959. 2) In July 1959, the SRE experienced a power excursion and partial meltdown that released 28 Curies of radioactive noble gases. According to DOE, the release resulted in the maximum off-site exposure of 0.099 millirem and an exposure of 0.018 millirem for the nearest residential building which is well within current limits today. 3) In 1964, the SNAP8ER experienced damage to 80% of its fuel. 4) In 1969 the SNAP8DR experienced similar damage to one-third of its fuel.

A radioactive fire occurred in 1971, involving combustible primary reactor coolant (NaK) contaminated with mixed fission products.

=== Sodium burn pits ===
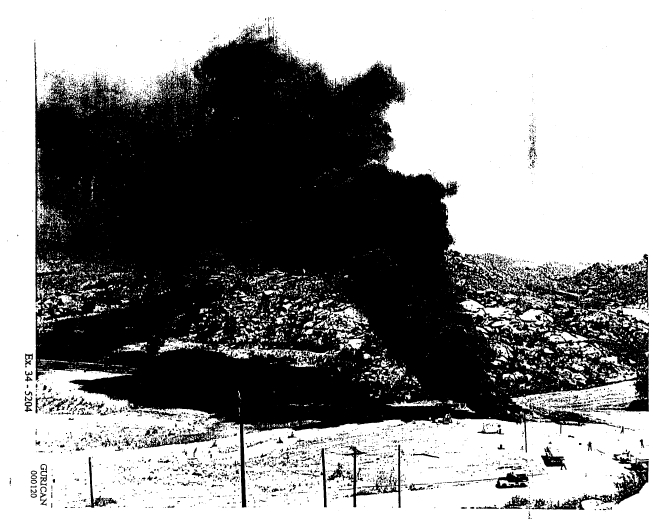
Toxic substances burn and are released into the air.

The sodium burn pit, an open-air pit for cleaning sodium-contaminated components, was also contaminated by the burning of radioactively and chemically contaminated items in it, in contravention of safety requirements. In an article in the Ventura County Star, James Palmer, a former SSFL worker, was interviewed. The article notes that "of the 27 men on Palmer's crew, 22 died of cancers." On some nights Palmer returned home from work and kissed "his wife [hello], only to burn her lips with the chemicals he had breathed at work." The report also noted that "During their breaks, Palmer's crew would fish in one of three ponds ... The men would use a solution that was 90 percent hydrogen peroxide to neutralize the contamination. Sometimes, the water was so polluted it bubbled. The fish died off." Palmer's interview ended with: "They had seven wells up there, water wells, and every damn one of them was contaminated," Palmer said, "It was a horror story."

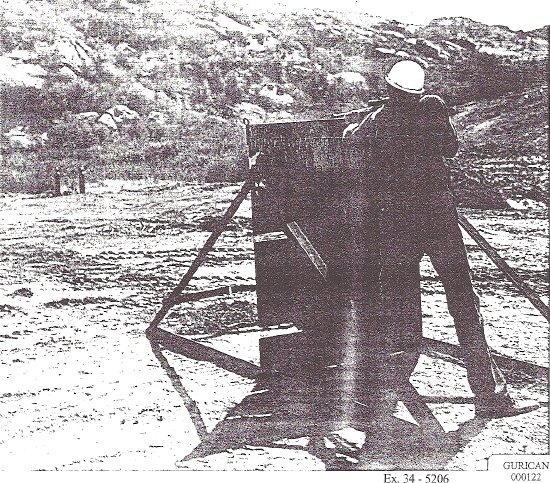
A worker disposes of barrels of sodium by shooting them with a rifle

In 2002, a Department of Energy (DOE) official described typical waste disposal procedures used by Field Lab employees in the past. Workers would dispose of barrels filled with radioactive sodium by dumping them in a pond and then shooting the barrels with rifles so that they would explode and release their contents into the air. Since then, the pit has been remediated by having 22,000 cubic yards of soil removed down 10–12 feet (3.0–3.7 m) to bedrock.

On 26 July 1994, two scientists, Otto K. Heiney and Larry A. Pugh were killed when the chemicals they were illegally burning in open pits exploded. After a grand jury investigation and FBI raid on the facility, three Rocketdyne officials pleaded guilty in June 2004 to illegally storing explosive materials. The jury deadlocked on the more serious charges related to illegal burning of hazardous waste. At trial, a retired Rocketdyne mechanic testified as to what he witnessed at the time of the explosion: "I assumed we were burning waste," Lee Wells testified, comparing the process used on 21 and 26 July 1994, to that once used to legally dispose of leftover chemicals at the company's old burn pit. As Heiney poured the chemicals for what would have been the third burn of the day, the blast occurred, Wells said. "[The background noise] was so loud I didn't hear anything ... I felt the blast and I looked down and my shirt was coming apart." When he realized what had occurred, Wells said, "I felt to see if I was all there ... I knew I was burned but I didn't know how bad." Wells suffered second- and third-degree burns to his face, arms and stomach.

=== 2018 Woolsey fire ===
The 2018 Woolsey Fire began at SSFL and burned about 80% of the site. After the fire, the Los Angeles County Department of Public Health found "no discernible level of radiation in the tested area" and the California Department of Toxic Substances Control, which is overseeing cleanup of the site, said in an interim report that "previously handled radioactive and hazardous materials were not affected by the fire." Bob Dodge, President of Physicians for Social Responsibility-Los Angeles, said "When it burns and becomes airborne in smoke and ash, there is real possibility of heightened exposure for area residents."

Boeing, the owner of most of the property, funded a study by Risk Assessment Corporation (RAC) which, in 2019, conducted soil sampling surrounding the SSFL, and performed source term estimation, atmospheric transport, and deposition modeling. The study report, published in 2023, concluded,

Air measurement data collected during the Woolsey Fire, along with atmospheric dispersion modeling and an offsite soil sampling program designed specifically to look for impacts from the fire, showed no evidence of SSFL impact in offsite soils because of the Woolsey Fire.

In 2020, the California Department of Toxic Substances Control (DTSC) stated in its final report that the fire did not cause contaminants to be released from the site into Simi Valley and other neighboring communities and that the risk from smoke exposure during the fire was not higher than what is normally associated with wildfire. Cleanup activists criticized the report's findings.

In 2021, a study that collected 360 samples of dust, ash, and soils from homes and public lands three weeks after the fire found that "Data did not support a finding of widespread deposition of radioactive particles" but that two locations "contained high activities of radioactive isotopes associated with the Santa Susana Field Laboratory." The study concluded that “The data show that Woolsey Fire ash did, in fact, spread SSFL-related radioactive microparticles, and the impacts were confined to areas closest to SSFL and at least three other scattered locations in the greater Simi Valley area."

Additional air quality monitoring was started by Ventura County Fire Department during the 2026 Sandy fire to establish a baseline before the fire reached the site.

=== Medical claims ===
In October 2006, the Santa Susana Field Laboratory Advisory Panel, made up of independent scientists and researchers from around the United States, concluded that based on available data and computer models, contamination at the facility resulted in an estimated 260 cancer related deaths. The report also concluded that the SRE meltdown caused the release of more than 458 times the amount of radioactivity released by the Three Mile Island accident. While the nuclear core of the SRE released 10 times less radiation than the TMI incident, the lack of proper containment such as concrete structures caused this radiation to be released into the surrounding environment. The radiation released by the core during the TMI incident was largely contained.

According to studies conducted by Hal Morgenstern between 1988 and 2002, residents living within 2 miles (3.2 km) of the laboratory are 60% more likely to be diagnosed with certain cancers compared to residents living 5 miles (8.0 km) from the laboratory, though Morgenstern said that the lab is not necessarily the cause.

== Cleanup Standards ==
During its years of rocket engine tests and nuclear research and operations, SSFL’s soil became contaminated with chemicals and radionuclides. Several accidents occurred in nuclear facilities, including the 1959 SRE core damage accident (see section on the Sodium Reactor Experiment). In addition, groundwater under SSFL is contaminated (principally with the solvent, TCE) following some 30,000 rocket engine tests. Extensive characterization has been completed for chemicals and radionuclides. The majority of SSFL buildings and facilities have been decommissioned and removed, and numerous interim soil cleanups have been conducted. DTSC leads site cleanup involving responsible parties (Boeing, DOE, and NASA), agencies (DTSC, LARWQCB, CDPH), and other stakeholders (activist organizations, community members, state and federal legislators, and the media). Cleanup standards and remedial options (remedy selection) continue to be debated and litigated. DTSC’s Final Program Environmental Impact Report (2023) estimates that soil cleanup will take another 15 years. The following summarizes in a generally chronological order, key events related to cleanup standards for both land and building structures and associated remedial options.

=== 1996 DOE and CDHS Approves Boeing’s Radiological Cleanup Standards ===
In March 1996, Rockwell proposed radiological cleanup standards for soil and buildings at SSFL. CDHS approved these standards in August 1996. DOE approved these standards in September 1996. Subsequently, Boeing issued final cleanup standards in February 1999. The soil cleanup goal was based on a dose rate of 15 mrem/y above background (300 mrem/y). This was less than the NRC’s future 25 mrem/y License Termination Rule and equivalent to the USEPA’s proposed 15 mrem/y dose-based goal for CERCLA remediation sites developed during the late1990s.

In May 1999, Senator Feinstein sent a series of letters to the Clinton Administration expressing concerns about nuclear decommissioning cleanup standards at SSFL. In June 1999, Boeing documented the basis for cleanup standards in use at SSFL, that were identical to standards used in the rest of the U.S.

=== 2001 CDHS Adopts NRC’s Decommissioning Standards ===
In 2001, the California Department of Health Services (CDHS) conducted a public hearing proposing to adopt by reference, the Nuclear Regulatory Commission’s 10 CFR 20 Subpart E, otherwise known as the License Termination Rule, that would codify the federal cleanup standard of 25 mrem/y. California, being an Agreement State, was obligated to utilize nuclear regulations, consistent with federal NRC regulations.

=== 2002 CBG Sues CDHS ===
In March 2002, the Committee to Bridge the Gap (CBG), the Southern California Federation of Scientists (SCFS) and the Physicians for Social Responsibility - Los Angeles (PSR-LA), sued CDHS, arguing that CDHS cannot adopt 10 CFR 20 Subpart E, and should comply with CEQA and the California APA, conduct an Environmental Impact Report (EIR) and conduct public hearings before adopting safe dose-based decommissioning standards. In April 2002 and June 2002, Judge Ohanesian, concurred with plaintiffs’ complaint. As of January 2024, twenty-two years later, CDHS (now CDPH) has ignored the Judge’s Order and still does not have a dose-based decommissioning standard or any numerical criteria for license termination of nuclear or radiological facilities.

=== 2003 DOE Environmental Assessment ===
In March 2003, DOE issued an Environmental Assessment (EA) that proposed a radiological cleanup standard of 15 mrem/y, that was safe and protective of public health, consistent with EPA’s one-time, draft dose-base standards and more restrictive than the NRC’s 25 mrem/y dose-based standard.

=== 2004 NRDC Sues DOE ===
In September 2004, NRDC, CBG and the City of Los Angeles sued DOE claiming that the 2003 EA had violated the National Environmental Policy Act (NEPA), the Comprehensive Environmental Response, Compensation and Liability Act (CERCLA) and Endangered Species Act (ESA). The lawsuit claimed that a full Environmental Impact Statement (EIS) should have been performed prior to selecting a soil cleanup remedy. In May 2007, US District Court Judge Samuel Conti found in favor of the plaintiffs stating that DOE had violated NEPA and should prepare a more detailed Environmental Impact Statement (EIS). In November 2018, DOE issued the final EIS, over 11 years after Judge Conti’s Order. As of January 2024, more than five years later, DOE has yet to issue a Record of Decision (ROD) on a soil cleanup standard for radionuclides and chemicals in Area IV.

=== 2007 Technical Feasibility of Detecting Radionuclide Contamination ===
In March 2007, Boeing issued a paper, utilizing EPA data, that detection of radionuclides at a 10^{−6} risk level for an agricultural land use scenario, was technically infeasible. This was prepared in response to initial California Senate hearings on SB 990 that would become California law nine months later (see later).

=== 2007 Consent Order for Corrective Action ===
In August 2007, DTSC, Boeing, DOE and NASA signed a Consent Order for Corrective Action, outlining planning, risk assessments and schedules for remediation at SSFL. The Consent Order was focused exclusively on chemical remediation of soil and groundwater. It was silent on radiological remediation and nuclear decommissioning. The Consent Order established a timeline for site cleanup to be completed by 2017.

=== 2007 Radiological Release Process ===
In September 2007, Boeing issued “Radiological Release Process - Process for the Release of Land and Facilities for (Radiologically) Unrestricted Use” which described the key steps in a generic decommissioning process typical of that used elsewhere in the United States.

=== 2007 SB 990 ===
In October 2007, SB 990 (Kuehl) was passed in the California Senate, that mandated an agricultural risk-based cleanup standard for chemicals and radionuclides and transferred regulatory authority for radiological cleanup at SSFL from CDHS and DOE to DTSC. SB 990 became law on January 1, 2008.

In October 2007, Boeing and Governor Schwarzenegger announced the intent to transfer SSFL to the State of California as open space parkland (following completion of remediation), along with an agreement from State Senator Sheila Kuehl that she would amend SB 990 to withdraw requirements for agricultural land use and DTSC land transfer approval.

In January 2008, this agreement fell through, following objections by other parties (CBG, NRDC, Sierra Club, PSR-LA, SCFS, etc.). These parties also objected to NPL listing by EPA since it would have taken control of cleanup out of the hands of DTSC (who would require cleanup-to-background in the future 2010 AOC) and given it to EPA (who would implement a CERCLA risk-based cleanup).

Boeing remained committed to the future of SSFL as open space, as evidenced by the April 2017 conservation easement recorded with the North American Land Trust (NALT) to permanently preserve and protect Boeing’s 2,400 acres at the Santa Susana site.

In November 2009, Boeing sued DTSC over SB 990, following months of unsuccessful negotiations between DTSC, Boeing, DOE and NASA attempting to incorporate the requirements of SB 990 into the 2007 Consent Order.

In April 2011, Judge John Walter of the United States District Court (Central District of California) issued an order in favor of Boeing, stating, “SB 990 is declared invalid and unconstitutional in its entirety under the Supremacy Clause of the United States Constitution” and “DTSC is hereby enjoined from enforcing or implementing SB 990.” In September 2014, the United States Court of Appeals (Ninth Circuit) upheld and affirmed the lower Court’s judgement.

=== 2010 AOCs ===
Perhaps in anticipation of losing the SB 990 lawsuit to Boeing, in December 2010, DTSC “encouraged” DOE and NASA to sign two identical Administrative Orders on Consent (AOCs) in which both RPs agreed to (1) clean-up to background, (2) dispense with EPA’s CERCLA risk assessment guidelines, (3) define soil to include building structures, and (4) send all soil (and structures) that exceed background radionuclides to an out-of-state licensed low-level radioactive waste disposal facility. Boeing had refused to negotiate or sign its own AOC, being involved in litigation with the State, over SB 990.

=== 2010-2013 Boeing Building Demolition ===
Between 2010 and 2013, Boeing demolished 40 remaining Boeing-owned non-radiological buildings in Areas I, III and IV based on DTSC approved procedures. Subsequent proposals in 2013 to demolish 6 remaining, released-for-unrestrictive-use, former radiological buildings in Area IV met with resistance. In August 2013, the Physicians for Social Responsibility - Los Angeles (PSR-LA) plus others, sued the DTSC, CDPH and Boeing, alleging that demolition debris from these buildings was LLRW and should be disposed out-of-state to a licensed low-level radioactive waste disposal facility. Five years later, in November 2018, the Superior Court of California found for the defendants. Five years later, in May 2023, the California Appeals Court reaffirmed the lower Court’s decision, denying plaintiffs’ petition. Subsequently Plaintiffs petitioned the California Supreme Court to review the case. The California Supreme Court denied the petition for review.

=== 2020 DOE Building Demolition ===
In May 2020, DTSC and DOE signed an Order on Consent for Interim Response Action at the Radioactive Material Handling Facility (RMHF) Complex. The Order on Consent required all demolition debris to be disposed out of the State of California at a licensed LLRW or MLLRW disposal facility or a DOE authorized LLRW or MLLRW disposal facility.

In October 2020, DTSC and DOE signed an Amendment to Order on Consent for Interim Response Action at the Radioactive Materials Handling Facility (RMHF) Complex. The title was misleading since the agreement has nothing to do with the RMHF, but states requirements for the demolition and disposal of eight remaining DOE-owned, non-RMHF facilities. These eight buildings included two that had been surveyed, confirming that structures to be demolished met all federal and state cleanup standards; two buildings that had been decommissioned and released for unrestricted use by DOE; and four buildings that had no history of radiological use, but had nevertheless been surveyed and confirmed to be “indistinguishable from background.” Nevertheless, “out of an abundance of caution,” the Amendment caused all demolition debris from all eight buildings, to be disposed of, out of the State of California, to a licensed MLLRW disposal facility.

=== NASA Building Demolition ===
NASA, in contrast to Boeing and DOE, appeared to have escaped the attention of DTSC and their partners, and was not required to dispose of building debris to a licensed LLRW disposal facility, “out of an abundance of caution.”

=== 2018 DOE Environmental Impact Statement (EIS) ===
In January 2017, DOE issued its Draft SSFL Area IV Environmental Impact Statement. In November 2018, DOE issued its Final Environmental Impact Statement, eleven years after it was ordered by Judge Conti in 2007. DOE’s preferred alternative for remediation of soils is the Conservation of Natural Resources, Open Space Scenario. DOE identified this preferred alternative because it would be consistent with the risk assessment approach typically used at other DOE sites, other California Department of Toxic Substances Control (DTSC) regulated sites, and U.S. Environmental Protection Agency CERCLA sites, which accounts for the specific open-space recreational future land use of the site. Use of a risk assessment approach would be consistent with the Grant Deeds of Conservation Easement and Agreements that commit Boeing’s SSFL property, including Area IV and the NBZ, to remaining as open space. This scenario would use a CERCLA risk assessment approach that would be protective of human health and the environment. This does not comply with the DTSC 2010 AOC “cleanup to background” mandate. DOE and DTSC have yet to negotiate a Record of Decision (ROD) for soils.

=== 2014-2020 NASA Environmental Impact Statement (EIS) ===
In March 2014, NASA issued its Final Environmental Impact Statement for Proposed Demolition and Environmental Cleanup Activities at Santa Susana Field Laboratory. In July 2020, NASA issued its Final Supplemental EIS for Soil Cleanup Activities. In September 2020, NASA issued its Record of Decision (ROD) for its Supplemental EIS for soil cleanup. The ROD identified Alternative C, Suburban Residential Cleanup as the Agency-Preferred Alternative. This does not comply with the DTSC 2010 AOC “cleanup to background” mandate. NASA recognizes the need to take no action until DTSC issues its ROD based on its Program Environmental Impact Report (PEIR).

=== 2017-2023 DTSC Program Environmental Impact Report (PEIR) ===
In September 2017, DTSC issued its Draft Program Environmental Impact Report for the Santa Susana Field Laboratory. In June 2023, following community input, DTSC issued its Final Program Environmental Impact Report for the Santa Susana Field Laboratory. DTSC stated that the PEIR was not a decision document (i.e. ROD), but nevertheless made it clear that it still supports the 2010 AOC requirements to cleanup radionuclides and chemicals to background, that is in conflict with DOE’s and NASA’s preferred alternatives in their respective Final EISs. Curiously, DTSC also issued in June 2023, a revised version of its draft PEIR, with deletions and additions. It was not immediately obvious why this was necessary in addition to the Final PEIS.

=== 2022 DTSC-Boeing Settlement Agreement ===
In May 2022, DTSC and Boeing signed a Settlement Agreement (SA) including a commitment by Boeing to cleanup chemicals to a residential risk-based garden standard (100% consumption of garden-grown fruits and vegetables) and cleanup radionuclides to background, in its areas of responsibility, namely Area I and III and the southern buffer zone. The Settlement Agreement was criticized by community groups and local governments for being done in secret, without public input; they also allege that it weakened the cleanup standards.

=== 2023 Surface Water ===
Boeing, DOE and NASA are responsible for remediation of soil and groundwater in Areas I/III, Area IV, and Area II respectively. Boeing alone is responsible for management and treatment of surface water (i.e. storm water) for the entire SSFL site. The SSFL National Pollution Discharge Elimination System (NPDES) Permit regulates discharge of surface water when, and if, it flows offsite. Radionuclide limits are identical to the EPA’s drinking water supplier limits. Chemical NPDES limits are, in general, even lower than EPA’s drinking water supplier limits, and are often based on ecological risk limits. The NPDES Permit has been in existence for decades. The current Permit was issued in October 2023.

In August 2022, a Memorandum of Understanding (MOU) was signed between Boeing and LARWQCB that describes future storm water management requirements following completion of SSFL soil remediation.

== Community involvement ==
=== Community Advisory Group ===
A petition to form a "CAG" or community advisory group was denied in March 2010 by DTSC. In 2012, the current CAG's petition was approved. The SSFL CAG recommends that all responsible parties execute a risk-based cleanup to EPA's suburban residential standard that will minimize excavation, soil removal, and backfill and thus reduce danger to public health and functions of surrounding communities. However, SSFL Panel believes the CAG has a conflict of interest, as it is funded in large part by a grant from the U.S. Department of Energy, and three of its members are former employees of Boeing or its parent company, North American Aviation. It is believed that the SSFL CAG is no longer active.

=== Documentary ===
In 2021, the three-hour documentary In the Dark of the Valley depicted mothers advocating for cleanup of the site who have children suffering from cancer believed to be caused by the contamination.

== See also ==
- Nuclear and radiation accidents and incidents
- Nuclear labor issues
- Nuclear reactor accidents in the United States

== External links and sources ==
External videos
- Fly-through Animation of Test Stand 1, Santa Susana Field Laboratory Area II, California, HAER, 27 March 2013
- Fly-through Animation of Bravo Test Area at the Santa Susana Field Laboratory, Santa Susana, CA, HAER, 25 September 2013
- Fly-through of Coca Test Area at Santa Susana Field Laboratory, HAER 6 June 2013

=== Responsible parties and agencies ===
- "DTSC - Santa Susana Field Laboratory Site Investigation and Cleanup website". Hosted by the California State Department of Toxic Substances Control which oversees the investigation and cleanup of chemicals in the soil and groundwater at the SSFL. Project status documents, reports and public comment materials are available
- "Boeing - Santa Susana Field Laboratory". Website hosted by The Boeing Company, the largest landowner of the Santa Susana Field Laboratory. This site contains general information for the soil and groundwater projects. Surface water discharge-related information for SSFL is posted in the Technical Library Section. Answers for frequently asked questions are provided.
- "U.S. DOE ETEC Closure Project Website". DOE-sponsored project website provides historical ETEC technology development, site usage and current closure project information. Interactive graphic found in Regulation section explains the various involved regulatory agencies and their roles at the site. Large number of documents located in the Reading Room
- "NASA - Santa Susana Field Laboratory". NASA's environmental cleanup and closure operations at NASA's portion of SSFL
- "LARWQCB - Santa Susana Field Laboratory". The Los Angeles Regional Water Quality Control Board administers the surface water NPDES permit for the SSFL
- "Draft Preliminary Site Evaluation of Santa Susana Field Laboratory (SSFL)". Archived from the original on 30 December 2009. U.S. DOE ATSDR – Agency for Toxic Substances & Disease Registry
- Historic American Engineering Record (HAER) documentation, filed under 5800 Woolsey Canyon Road, Simi Valley, Ventura County, CA:
  - HAER No. CA-2282, "Santa Susana Field Laboratory", 4 measured drawings, 14 data pages
  - HAER No. CA-2283, "Santa Susana Field Laboratory, Alfa Test Area", 5 photos, 1 color transparency, 9 measured drawings, 8 data pages, 2 photo caption pages
  - HAER No. CA-2284, "Santa Susana Field Laboratory, Bravo Test Area", 3 photos, 12 measured drawings, 8 data pages, 1 photo caption page
  - HAER No. CA-2285, "Santa Susana Field Laboratory, Coca Test Area", 12 photos, 2 color transparencies, 16 measured drawings, 14 data pages, 3 photo caption pages
  - HAER No. CA-2286, "Santa Susana Field Laboratory, Delta Test Area", 15 photos, 3 photo caption pages
  - HAER No. CA-2287, "Santa Susana Field Laboratory, Service Area", 21 photos, 2 measured drawings, 2 photo caption pages
- National Park Service Heritage Documentation Programs "Santa Susana Field Laboratory - A Documentation Project by the National Park Service and NASA". National Park Service.
- Sage Ranch Park website

=== Groups ===
- The Santa Susana Advisory Panel

=== Media ===
- EnviroReporter.com: Investigative news website that has coverage of Rocketdyne issues since 1998, often in partnership with regional publications including the LA Weekly and Ventura County Reporter newspapers.
- History Channel History Channel: "Rocketdyne Meltdown" on YouTube
- "The Rockets' Red Glare: First Installment". YouTube. 16 June 2007. Archived from the original on 21 December 2021. An upcoming documentary film recounts the horrors and hazards of the work done at Boeing's Santa Susana Field Laboratory. This first installment focuses on the workers and their every-day exposure to the hazardous environment provided by the owners and operators of this lab.
- "Discussed at FARK: Radioactive emissions from a nuclear meltdown in California 47 years ago are worse than anybody thought. In other news, there was a nuclear meltdown in the US back in 1959".
- Joel Grover and Matthew Glasser LA'S Nuclear Secret, Part 1-5 NBC4, 21 September 2015, retrieved 23 December 2015.

=== Reactor accident sources ===
- "-NAA-SR-MEMO-3757" (PDF). Archived from the original (PDF) on 28 September 2007. Release of Fission Gas from the AE-6 Reactor, hosted by RocketdyneWatch.org
- "-NAA-SR-5898" (PDF). Archived from the original (PDF) on 28 September 2007. Analysis of SRE Power Excursion, hosted by RocketdyneWatch.org
- "-NAA-SR-4488" (PDF). Archived from the original (PDF) on 28 September 2007. SRE Fuel Element Damage an Interim Report, hosted by RocketdyneWatch.org
- "-NAA-SR-4488-Suppl" (PDF). Archived from the original (PDF) on 28 September 2007. SRE Fuel Element Damage Final Report, hosted by RocketdyneWatch.org
- "-NAA-SR-MEMO-12210" (PDF). Archived from the original (PDF) on 28 September 2007. SNAP8 Experimental Reactor Fuel Element Behavior: Atomics International Task Force Review, hosted by RocketdyneWatch.org
- "-NAA-SR-12029" (PDF). Archived from the original (PDF) on 28 September 2007. Postoperation Evaluation of Fuel Elements from the SNAP8 Experimental Reactor hosted by RocketdyneWatch.org
- "-AI-AEC-13003" (PDF). Archived from the original (PDF) on 28 September 2007. Findings of the SNAP 8 Developmental Reactor (S8DR) Post-Test Examination, hosted by RocketdyneWatch.org
