= Energy Technology Engineering Center =

Nuclear engineering complex in California

Coordinates: 34.2341°N 118.7071°W

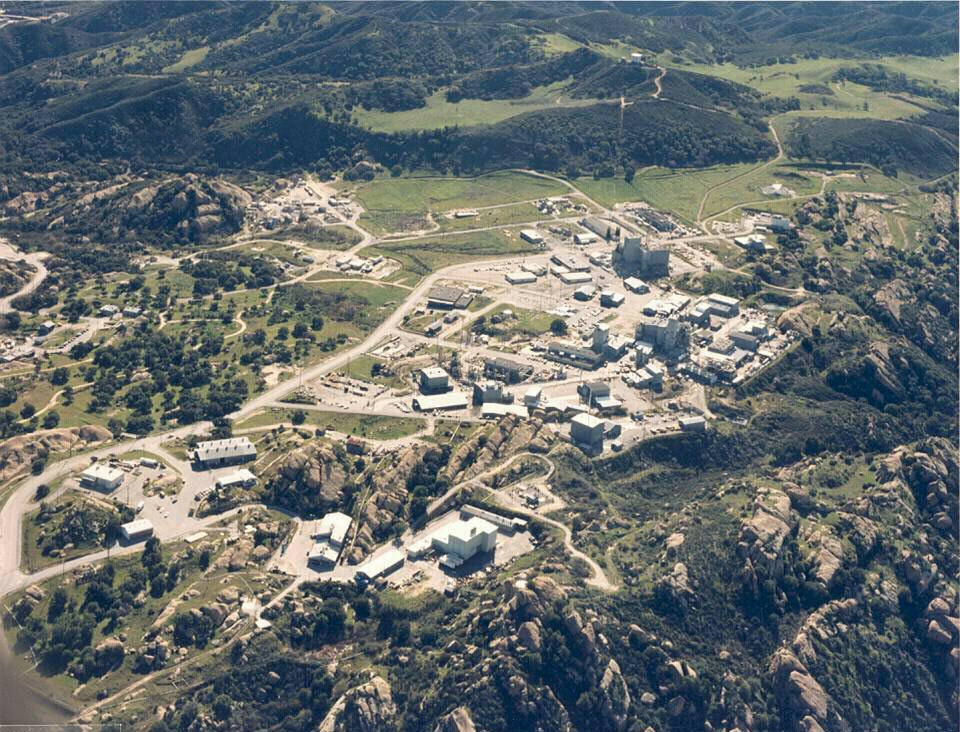
Aerial view of ETEC in 1988.

The Energy Technology Engineering Center (ETEC), was a government-owned, contractor-operated complex of industrial facilities located within the 2,850-acre (11.5 km^{2}) Santa Susana Field Laboratory (SSFL), Ventura County, California. The ETEC specialized in non-nuclear testing of components which were designed to transfer heat from a nuclear reactor using liquid metals instead of water or gas. The center operated from 1966 to 1998. The ETEC site has been closed and is now undergoing building removal and environmental remediation by the U.S. Department of Energy.

== History ==
In 1966, ETEC began as the Liquid Metals Engineering Center (LMEC). The LMEC was created by the U.S. Atomic Energy Commission to provide development and non-nuclear testing of liquid metal reactor components. The Liquid Metals Information Center (LMIC) was established at the same time by the AEC. The LMIC served as a technical information library relating to liquid metals and liquid metal components for the United States government. Both the LMEC and LMIC supported the United States Government's Liquid Metal Fast Breeder Reactor program.

The LMEC and the LMIC were established within a western portion of Santa Susana Field Laboratory called Area IV. In 1978, the LMEC charter was expanded to include general energy-related technology and the center was renamed the Energy Technology Engineering Center. Research and development at ETEC primarily involved metallic sodium because the proposed Fast Breeder Reactor required liquid sodium to operate. Sodium was chosen because it has desirable heat transfer properties, a low operating pressure when compared to water, and sodium has a relatively low melting point.

The liquid metal components tested included steam generators, pumps, valves, flow meters and a variety of instrumentation. Investigation into the metallurgical properties of piping exposed to the high temperatures for long periods of time was also performed. The Components were designed and fabricated then installed into a test facility and evaluated under operating conditions with the overall goal of improving the reliability and safety of the components and ultimately, the nuclear reactor the components would be used in.

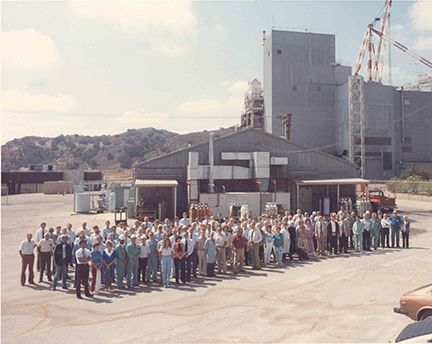
Group photo of Energy Technology Engineering Center employees in 1989. The Sodium Pump Test Facility can be seen in the far background.

The ETEC personnel operated several unique test facilities to evaluate nuclear reactor component tests using metallic sodium. One facility, the Sodium Pump Test Facility, capable of circulating up to 55,000 gallons of liquid sodium per minute at temperatures up to 1,300 °F (704 °C), was the largest sodium pump test facility in the world.

== Corporate Organization ==
The LMEC was originally operated by the Atomics International division of North American Aviation and later by way of corporate merger, by Rockwell International. In 1996, The Boeing Company purchased Rocketdyne and assumed the ETEC contract with the Department of Energy.

Two distinct organizations within Atomics International were supported by the DOE at SSFL Area IV: one focused on the development of civilian nuclear power and the other, LMEC/ETEC, was the center of excellence for research and testing of non-nuclear components relating to liquid metals. Although ETEC was operated by Atomics International (and later by Rockwell International), the U.S. Government required the ETEC be operated separately from Atomics International in order to avoid giving the company an unfair advantage through preferential access to government-sponsored research. Thus, the ETEC operated as an autonomous entity within Atomics International.

At its height in 1973, ETEC employed four hundred fifty people. Parent Atomics International employed some 9,000 people during its height in the late 1970s.

The distinction between ETEC and AI nuclear division is blurred by the demise of Atomics International and the cleanup of radioactive materials under DOE's "ETEC Closure" contract with The Boeing Company. The US Department of Energy has assumed responsibility for the identification and, if necessary, cleanup of impacts to the environment resulting from the sodium- or radioactive material-related activities within SSFL Area IV.

== Waste Management Practices ==
Components removed from a sodium–related test facility require careful management because the residual sodium within the component reacts violently with water, thus is a hazard to human health and the environment. In some cases, bulk quantities of sodium required disposal. Prior to the establishment of the 1976 Federal Resource Conservation and Recovery Act which regulates the treatment and disposal of sodium waste, ETEC personnel operated an on-site treatment and disposal site. The site is called the Former Sodium Disposal Facility (FSDF) and was located at the extreme western edge of Area IV. The components were cleaned at the FSDF by reacting the sodium inside with steam or by tossing them into a large pool of water. The steam (or water) reacts with the sodium and removes the hazardous residues.

In 1978, in compliance with the new Federal Resource Conservation and Recovery Act ETEC established the Hazardous Waste Management Facility (HWMF), a specialized facility to remove residual sodium from used components. The HWMF operated under the Federal RCRA regulations and closed in 1998.

== Environmental Impacts ==
The research and development activities at ETEC resulted in contamination to the surrounding environment. While the FSDF was not intended for the disposal of chemicals or radioactive materials, it is clear these materials were present there. The Final Report for the FSDF cleanup prepared by Boeing notes that "a small amount of very low level radioactive waste was inadvertently disposed of at the site…"

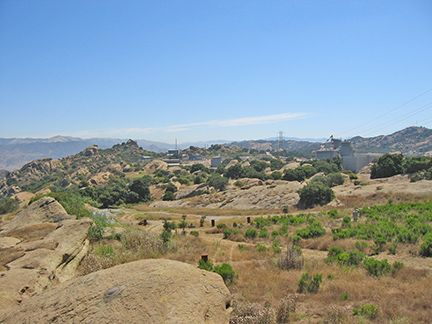
The Former Sodium Disposal Facility in June 2005. The site underwent environmental remediation in 1992 and again in 1999. View is towards the north east.

The impacted soils were removed from the FSDF by Rocketdyne for the DOE in 1992. A video explaining the 1992 FSDF cleanup was produced by Rocketdyne. In 1998, the California Department of Public Health, Radiologic Health Branch determined the site to be clean up to the standards then in effect. Further cleanup to remove traces of mercury and Polychlorinated biphenyls from the surrounding site was completed in 1999.

Other locations within Area IV (and the remainder of SSFL) have been undergoing an environmental Facility Investigation under the Resource Conservation and Recovery Act since 1994. The investigation is overseen by the California State Department of Toxic Substances Control. A firm estimated completion date for the investigation and subsequent remediation, if any, could not be found.

By 2007, all of the sodium-related facilities have been removed from Area IV with the exception of the Sodium Pump Test Facility and the Hazardous Waste Management Facility. All of the metallic sodium has been removed from ETEC.

== Other Santa Susana Field Laboratory activities ==
Most of the 2,850-acre (11.5 km^{2}) Santa Susana Field Laboratory—SSFL was used for the testing and development of rocket engines by Rocketdyne over a fifty-year period, initially for defensive missiles, and then primarily for the National Aeronautics and Space Administration—NASA space vehicles. That took place at locations in Areas I, II, and III totaling ~ 2,560 acres. The ETEC site is ~90 acres, of Area IV's 290 acre total.

There has been considerable environmental impact investigations underway across SSFL, including at the ETEC sites, since the 1990s to develop cleanup criteria, characterization measurement standards, and methods to use to reach contractual terms of completion. In the interim, some small site specific cleanups, contaminated surface water flow remediation, and minor habitat restoration efforts have been tried. The cleanup data gathering, and eventual cleanup projects (of chemical &/or radiological toxins), are under the direction of the DTSC—California Department of Toxic Substances Control of CalEPA, with a 2017 completion deadline/goal.

Interim remediation means, contaminant characterization studies, and all mandated cleanup work is funded by the R.P.s—Responsible Parties. They are the DOE—U.S. Department of Energy and The Boeing Company for the ETEC site (~90 acres) within Area IV. For the rest of the SSFL property the R.P.s are Boeing and/or NASA fL, depending on: the Area (I, II, &/or III); contaminant types, and physical toxin location (i.e.: surface soils, aquifers, deep bedrock, etc.).

== See also ==
- Santa Susana Field Laboratory
- Index: Simi Hills
