= John Coates Till =

English-American entertainer (1843–1910)

John Coates Till (April 30, 1843 – May 31, 1910) was an English American marionettist and entertainer born in London, England, and died in Malden, Massachusetts. He was active in the late 19th and early 20th centuries.

== Career ==
According to John McCormick in The Victorian Marionette Theatre, Till traveled to America with W.J. Bullock's company around 1874 and subsequently worked with Middleton's royal marionette company before establishing himself as an independent performer and maker of marionettes for sale.

Advertisements, articles, and reviews from the late 19th through early 20th centuries describe Till and his wife, Louisa Till, as acclaimed marionettists and entertainers who traveled widely throughout the United States and Canada performing original shows with their marionettes and automatons. The Tills often traveled with variety shows, such as Hyde & Behman's Specialty Company, working in conjunction with other notable performers of the period.

In more recent scholarship, the Tills' minstrel marionette show has been examined for its racially charged depictions of African Americans in the Reconstruction Era.
