= John Christian Till =

John Christian Till (May 18, 1762 – November 19, 1844) was one of the first American composers. He joined the Bethleham Moravian Congregation as an organist in 1813.
