= Encino Hot Springs =

Thermal springs

- El Encino Springs
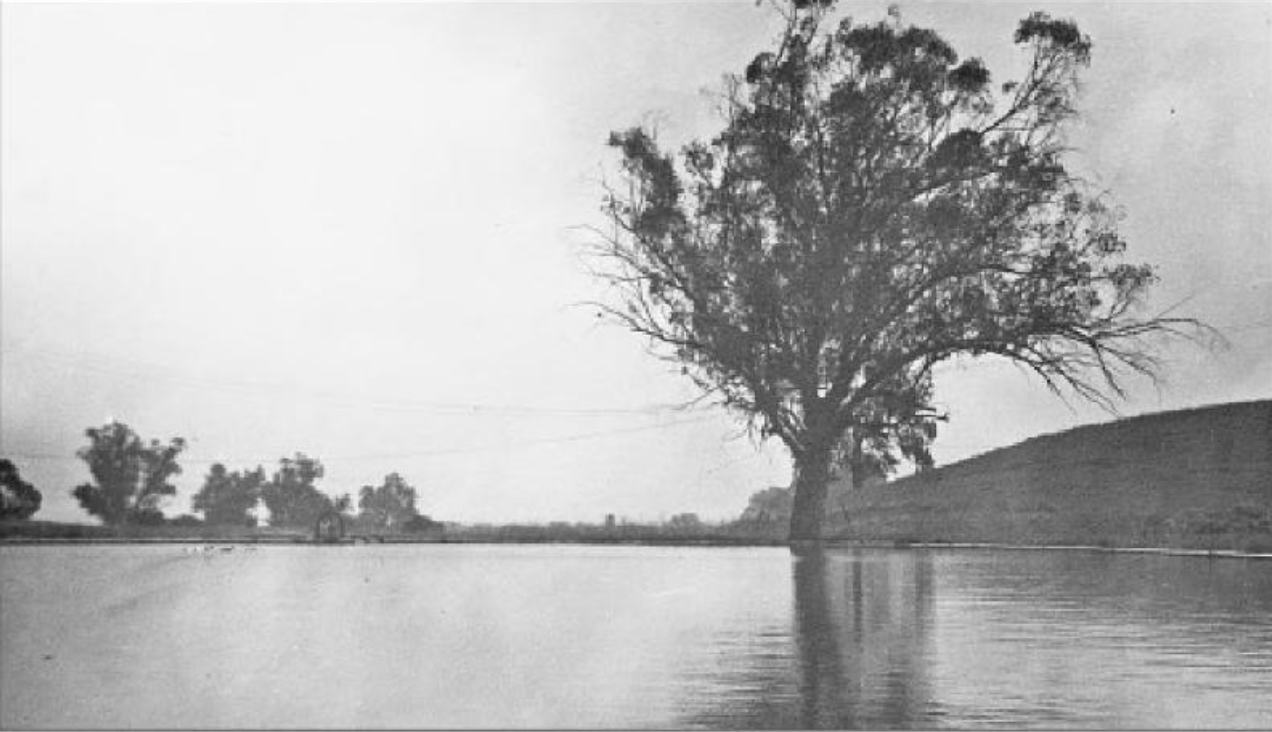
- El Encino Springs reservoir in 1901
- Interactive map of Encino Hot Springs
- Coordinates: 34°9′32″N 118°29′56″WNOAA
- Type: geothermal
- Discharge: 65 liters/minute
- Temperature: 79–90 °F (26–32 °C)

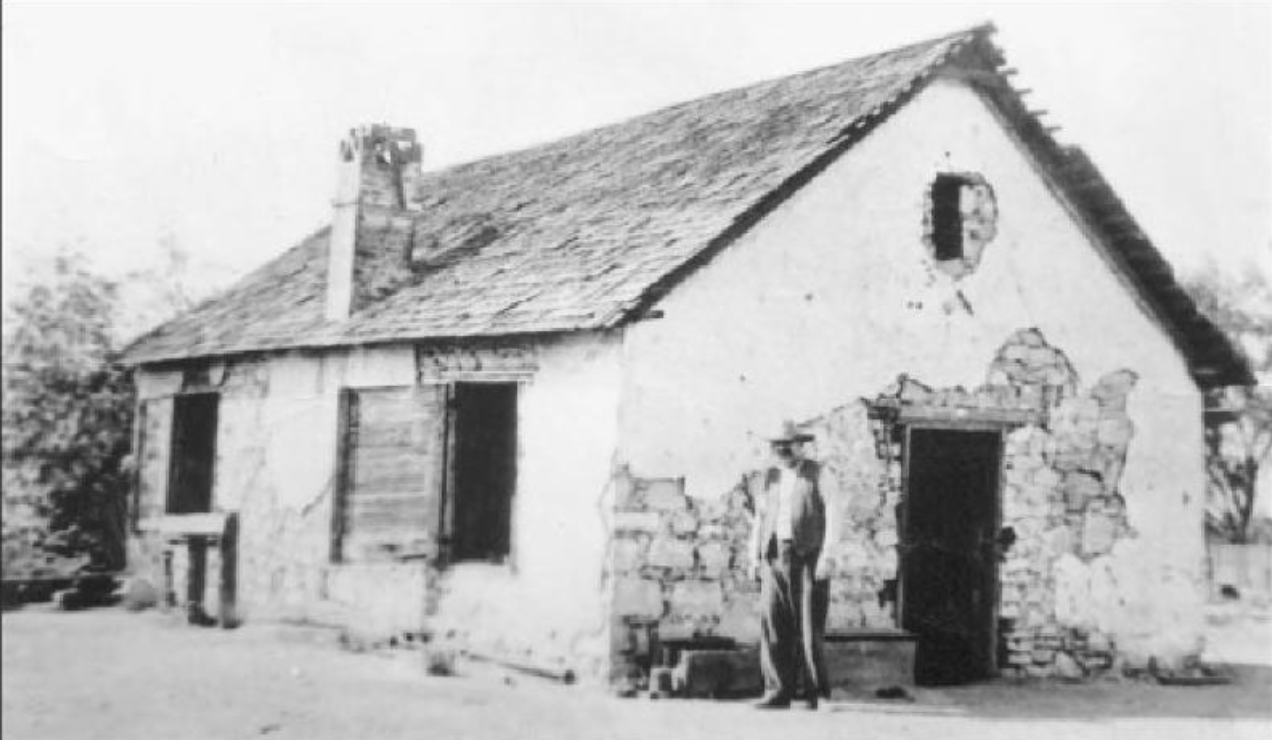
Old bathhouse at Encino hot mineral spring, shown with Alex Abel, caretaker of the Amestoy Ranch

Encino Hot Springs are historic thermal springs located at the site of Siutcanga village, a settlement of the Tongva-Kizh people of the area now known as Southern California. It was used by several tribes of Indigenous peoples for thousands of years. Later, after settlement, the artesian springs were used as a water source for Rancho Los Encinos in what is now the San Fernando Valley region of Los Angeles County, California. In the 1880s it was a rest stop on the Butterfield Stagecoach route. The springs are located in the modern-day Los Encinos State Historic Park.

== History ==
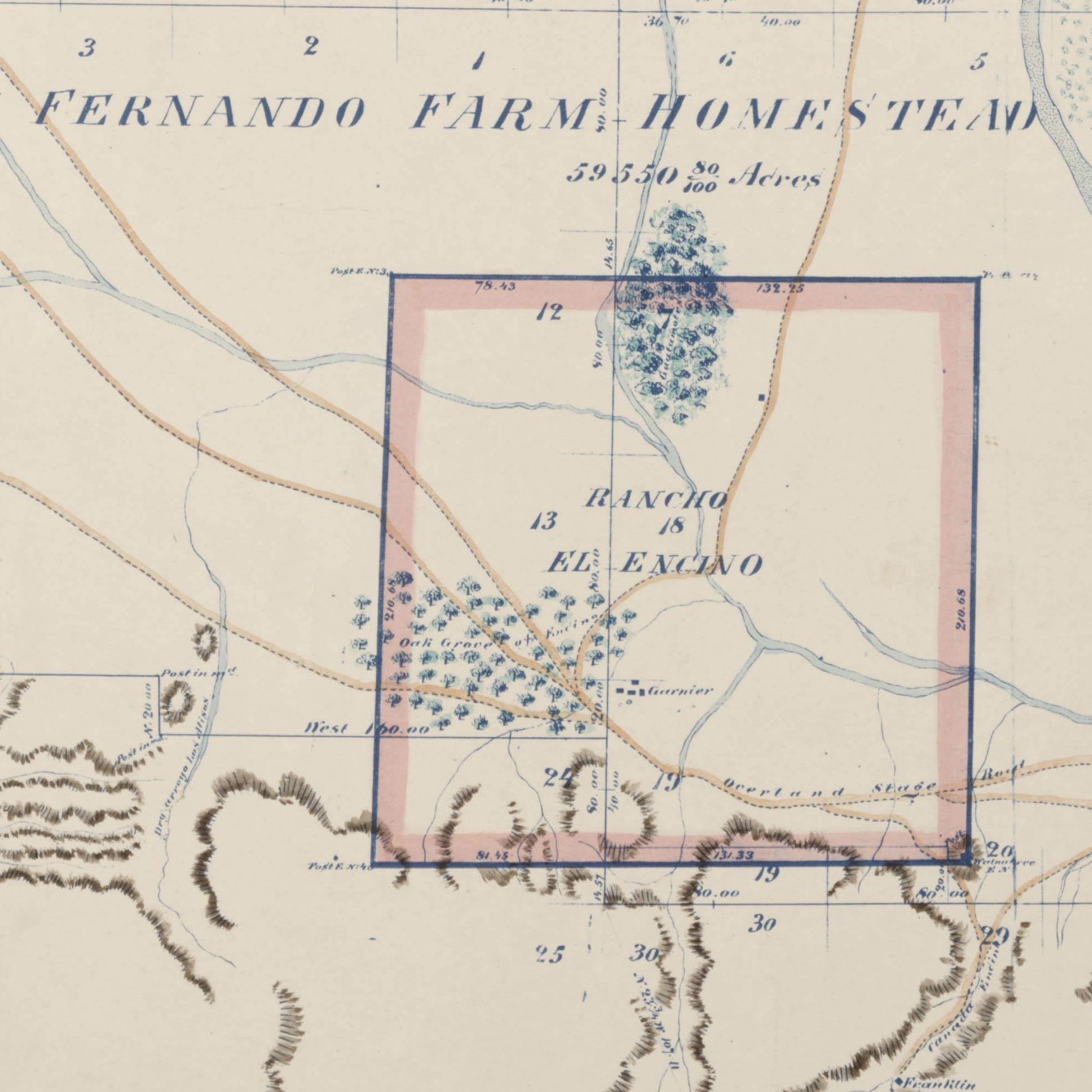
Rancho El Encino mapped in 1871, before the spring water reservoirs were constructed, showing groves of encinos (oaks), guatamotes (willows), and the overland stage road

In August 1769, an expedition led by Gaspar de Portola came upon a grove of oak trees (Spanish: encinos) which they named El Valle de la Catalina de Bononia de los Encinos. Franciscan missionary and explorer Juan Crespí, who was the diarist for the expedition, mentioned the artesian springs in his 1769 diary. He described the Indigenous peoples living there in two villages populated with a total of about 200 inhabitants. The springs were a gathering place for several thousand years for the Tongva, Chumash, Tataviam and other Indigenous tribes. These Indigenous inhabitants were formerly referred to as "Fernandeños" by the Spanish colonialists because they were enslaved by the San Fernando Mission. Rancho Los Encinos, the land encompassing the springs, was originally granted by the Spanish king to a veteran of the Portolá expedition named Juan Francisco Reyes, then regranted to the San Fernando Mission in 1797, and then finally, after secularization, in 1845, one square Spanish league was granted by the Mexican government to Ramon, Francisco and Roque, who are traditionally believed to have been Mission Indians. Before the Battle of Providencia occurred in 1845, Manuel Micheltorena's troops camped at the Encino Springs.

== Description ==
From 1849 to 1862, Jose Vicente de los Reyes de la Ossa, commonly known as Vicente de la Osa, and his wife, Rita de la Osa, owned the historic rancho property where the springs were situated. Land case records state that de la Osa had sought out the "Native Americans who owned Encino prior to him in exchange for the right to purchase the rancho from them." Another account states that de la Osa purchased the site from "three Indians" for $100. De la Osa claimed that the springs on the property were "both cold and warm, the latter possessing medicinal qualities." In the 1850s, De la Osa fenced off the springs and announced his intention to charge drovers two cents a head to water cattle and horses, and one cent per sheep.

The spring water collection ponds were built around 1872 by Eugene Garnier, and in 1875 it was reported that the main ranch spring "supplied a stone reservoir and a bathing pool and yielded about 5 U.S. gallons (19 L; 4.2 imp gal) a minute". In 1890, an account of the springs described "a number" of sources that were in "local use" at Encino.

"The Encino spring was used as one of the first mineral springs along El Camino Real. The old bathhouse was a favorite stop for riders along the Butterfield Stage route in the 1880s. They could refresh themselves from the long dusty trip from Los Angeles to San Francisco. The bathhouse fell into disrepair as shown here with Alex Abel, caretaker of the ranch under the Amestoys, and was later removed."

In 1915, two spring sources were identified on the site, approximately 30 feet (9.1 m) apart within the stone reservoir, the smaller spring west of the larger spring. The geologic source of the water is associated with the Miocene shale, where the shale "dips about 25°N" toward the Valley, and was a "primary and secondary alkaline and primary saline water of moderate mineralization".

In 1925, a Mexican worker at the site discovered a 20-inch (51 cm) grinding mortar made of volcanic basalt, and a possible burial ground west of the springs. The large bowl-shaped mortar had a beaded edge. The Los Angeles Times reported that the archeologist John A. Comstock claimed the "Indians in the Encino Hot Springs vicinity fashioned the finest stone vessels of any Indians In this part of the country with the possible exception of Catalina Island Indians, who had a stone particularly adaptable to such purposes". The mortero was estimated to be between 1000 and 1500 years old.

In 1946 it was reported that the state of California had established a fund to acquire El Ranchos de Los Encinos, (a five-acre rancho), including the hot springs that formerly belonged to the Indigenous peoples of the area.

In 1949, the National Environmental Health Association published a study on mosquitos in the Los Angeles area, stating that two species that may carry disease had been found in the hot springs area. The springs have been under the purview of the California State Parks and Recreation department since 1949, and continue to feed the reservoir (alternately called an artificial lake or "fishpond") that was built by Garnier in the 1870s.

=== Historic resort ===
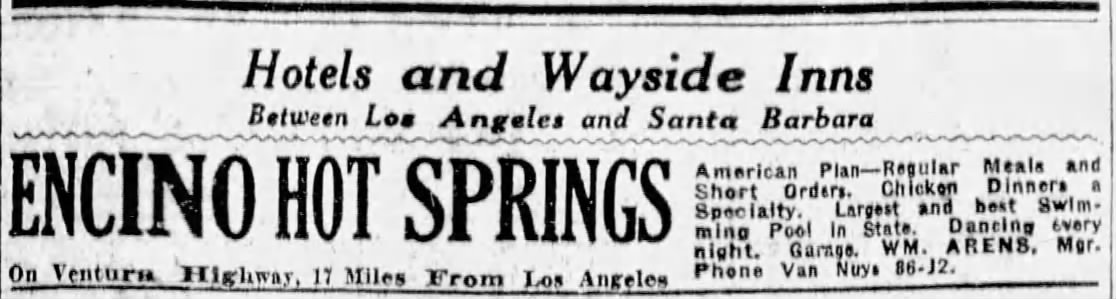
"Encino Hot Springs" Los Angeles Evening Express, September 22, 1923

In the 1920s, a resort and hotel operated at Encino Hot Springs. The resort was built on Ventura Boulevard, and became a popular spot that included entertainment. In July 1922, the Van Nuys News reported that over 1000 people visited the resort in one day. The report stated that the site was known as the "old Amestoy Homestead", and mentioned that a swimming pool and dance hall were being constructed at the "famous hot spring".

In 1928, the hot springs property was purchased from T.S. Ward and Mrs. R. White by H.W. Oakes, a restaurant owner from San Diego.

== Water profile ==
In 1875, the hot spring water temperature was measured at 85 °F (29 °C). The mineral content was recorded as including sodium, calcium, sulphate, chloride, carbonate, silica, and trace amounts of potassium, lithium and phosphate. Carbon dioxide and hydrogen sulphide gasses percolated up through the spring water.

Decades later, NOAA measured the spring water temperature at 79 °F (26 °C) at the source.

In 1969, the measured yield of the springs was 24,000 U.S. gallons (91,000 L; 20,000 imp gal) per day. The hot springs continue to flow, as of 1978, at the Los Encinos State Historic Park.

== See also ==
- Encino Oak Tree
- Tongva Sacred Springs
- Ranchos of Los Angeles County
- List of hot springs in the United States
