= Siutcanga =

Former Tongva settlement in Encino, California, US

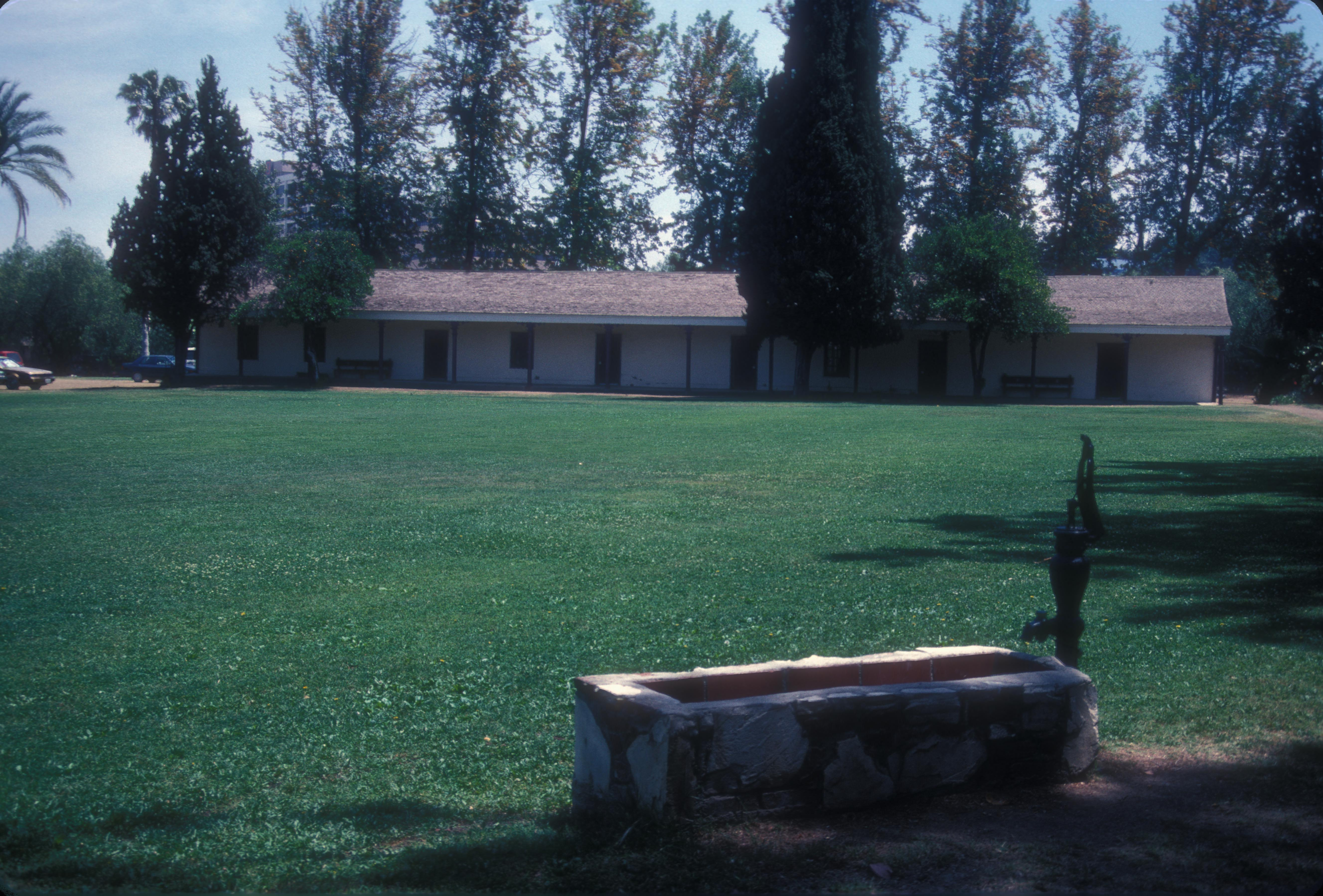
Los Encinos State Historic Park (pictured in 2008) is the site of the village of Siutcanga.

Siutcanga (English: "the place of the oaks"), alternatively spelled Syútkanga, was a Tataviam and Tongva village that was located in what is now Los Encinos State Historic Park near the site of a natural spring. The traditional trading route which the village relied on to flourish is now the street known as Ventura Boulevard. The Fernandeño Tataviam Band of Mission Indians organization has indicated that the majority of their members descend from the village and maintain a deep relationship to the site. People of the village are known as Siutcavitam.

== History ==
The village has been dated to being 4,000 years old.

Following the Spanish colonial period, Indigenous people were at one time re-granted the land from Mexican governor Pio Pico in the mid-nineteenth century. In 1843, a man by the name of Tiburcio became the first inheritor to the land. Then, in 1845, three Indigenous peoples listed by the names Ramon, Francisco and Roque received title to the land, recorded as Rancho Los Encinos. Each of these individuals are ancestors to the Fernandeño Tataviam Band of Mission Indians.

However, following the American occupation of California, control over the land was lost due to a shift in attitudes as well as the business practices of a Californio by the name of Vicente de la Osa. This was acknowledged as stealing of the land by the tribe because a local settler used the legal apparatus to expand his land claims over the water resources of the Encino Springs.

In 1984, the site was disturbed by commercial developments for the Encino Towers and Casa Balboa property, which uncovered thousands of cultural items. Archaeologists kept these items from the tribe and held them for ransom, eventually being housed at Palomar College. What remained of the artifacts were finally returned to the tribe in 2015.

== See also ==
- Encino Oak Tree
