= Rancho Los Encinos =

Historic land grant rancho in San Fernando Valley, California

- Rancho El Encino
- U.S. National Register of Historic Places
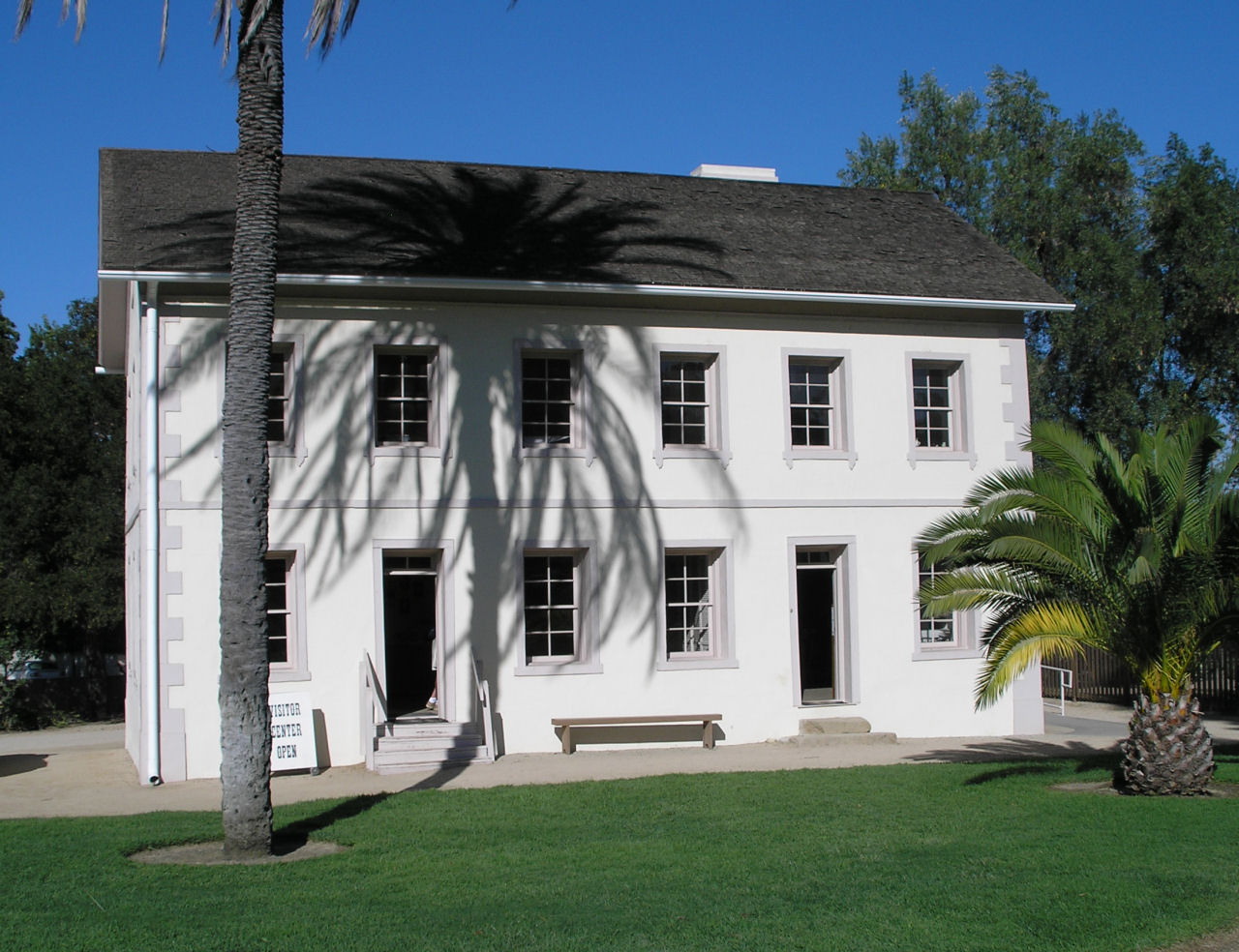
- The limestone Garnier building at Rancho Los Encinos: restored from 1994 Northridge earthquake damages and now the park's Visitor Center.

- Location within the Los Angeles metropolitan area
- Location: Encino, California
- Coordinates: 34°9′34.40″N 118°29′58.28″W
- Built: 1845
- Architectural style: Spanish Colonial, Basque vernacular
- NRHP reference No.: 71000142
- Added to NRHP: February 24, 1971

Rancho Los Encinos (also Rancho El Encino and Rancho Encino) was a Spanish grazing concession, and later Mexican land granted cattle and sheep rancho and travelers way-station on the El Camino Real in the San Fernando Valley, in present-day Encino, Los Angeles County, California. The original 19th-century adobe and limestone structures and natural Encino Springs are now within the Los Encinos State Historic Park.

== History ==
=== Origins ===
The name of the rancho derives from the original designation of the Valley by the Portola expedition of 1769: El Valle de Santa Catalina de Bononia de los Encinos, with encino being the Spanish name for Oaks, after the many native deciduous Valley Oak (Quercus lobata) and evergreen Coast Live Oak (Quercus agrifolia) trees across the valley's savannah, which are still found on the park's property.

The naturally carbonated Encino Springs on the land were used by Tongva people of Suitcanga village. Portola camped here, and the springs were a necessary stop for travelers on El Camino Real, and the Ventura Road, which became Ventura Boulevard.

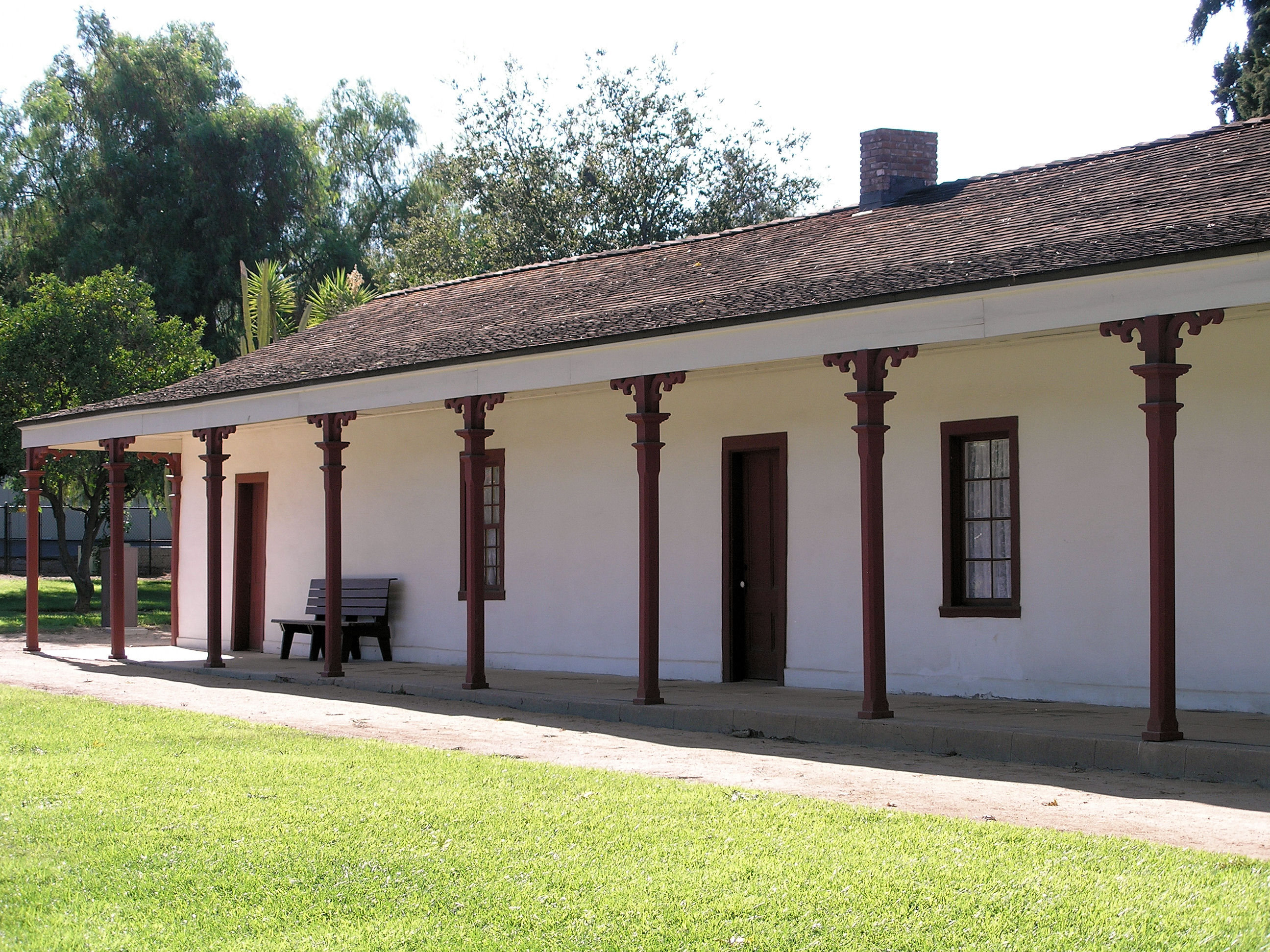
The house in 2007

Francisco Reyes, alcalde, or mayor of Pueblo de Los Angeles from 1793–1795, established the original Rancho Encino in the northern San Fernando Valley. In or around 1797 Reyes ceded this land to the Roman Catholic Church to be the site of Mission San Fernando Rey de España, and relocated his Rancho Encino to one square Spanish league (4,460 acres) of land in the southern valley adjacent to El Camino Real and between the Los Angeles River and Santa Monica Mountains.

Reyes was accused of mistreating the Mission Indians who worked his rancho, and in 1845 Mexican Governor Pío Pico re-granted the property to three of the Tongva Native American workers, recorded as Ramon, Francisco, and Roque, who raised cattle and corn. Ramon, Francisco and Roque had worked the land beginning in about 1834, however, by the time the claim was recognized in 1845 "Francisco and Roque were dead. Their widows inherited the land and worked it for a few years with Ramon and his family until 1849 when Roman deserted them and his daughter Aguedo, and ran off to the gold fields." The surviving widows of the grantees sold out.

In 1849, Don Vicente de la Osa or de la Ossa, the original owner of the nearby Rancho Providencia, acquired the Tongva Indians' interests in the property. His wife was Rita de Guillén de la Ossa, daughter of Eulalia Pérez de Guillén Mariné of Rancho San Pascual. He built a 9-room adobe farmhouse in 1849–1850 that still stands near the spring. According to the Los Angeles Times, "A petition for Rancho el Encino was presented to the U.S. Board of Land Commissioners in 1852, in which Don Vincent de la Ossa claimed he had purchased one-third of the property in 1849. Unable to pay his taxes, Ramon sold the final portion in 1857 to de la Osa, who paid $9.33 for 312 acres." After de la Osa died, his widow sold it to L.A. County sheriff James Paul Thompson, who was also her future son-in-law.

With the cession of California to the United States following the Mexican-American War, the 1848 Treaty of Guadalupe Hidalgo provided that the land grants would be honored. As required by the Land Act of 1851, a claim for Rancho Los Encinos was filed with the Public Land Commission in 1852, and the grant was patented to Vicente de la Osa et al Jan. 8, 1873, for 4,460.73 acres.

=== Boom and bust ===
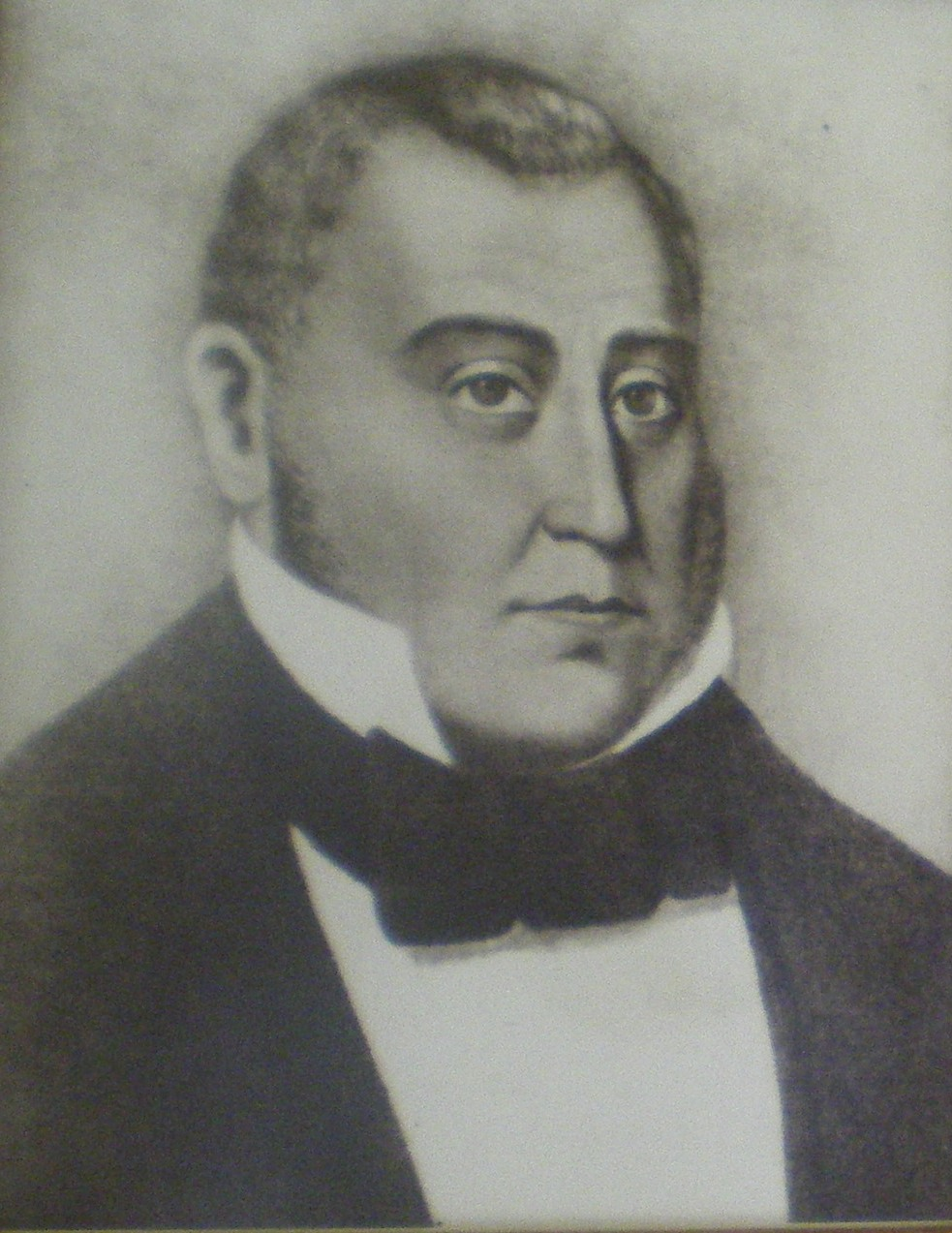
Vicente de la Ossa, c. 1850

The California Gold Rush of 1849 created a near-insatiable demand for beef, which was raised on the ranchos of southern California, including Rancho Los Encinos, and driven on the hoof to northern markets serving the gold fields. But the boom market in Southern California began to decline as early as 1855 as it became profitable to drive cattle and sheep to California from the midwest and Texas, and the drought of 1856 increased the pressure on the ranchos.

The De La Osa rancho was a popular stopping point for El Camino Real and Camino Nuevo travelers, who could expect hospitality at the ranch house. The Butterfield Overland Mail stagecoach route between St. Louis, Missouri and San Francisco via Fort Yuma and Los Angeles passed through the rancho, making its first run in the fall of 1858. A new stagecoach route opened in 1861, diverging from the old El Camino Real at Rancho Los Encinos and heading for Santa Barbara via the Santa Susana Stage Road over Santa Susana Pass in the Simi Hills. The rancho was a stagecoach stop on it until the new railroad replaced Butterfield stages in 1875.

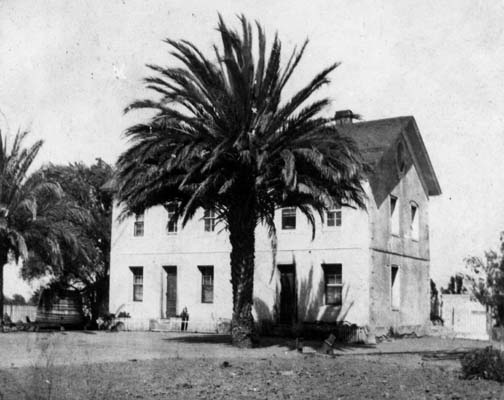
Rancho Los Encinos: The Garnier building in 1900

With the cattle market in collapse and besieged by mounting debts, in 1859 De la Osa converted his house into a roadside inn and began to charge patrons for his legendary Californio hospitality. Don Vicente De la Osa died in 1861, and his widow Rita sold the property to James Thompson in 1867, who raised sheep on the rancho for two years. Thompson in turn sold the property to two Basque brothers, Eugene and Phillipe Garnier, in 1869. Eugene Garnier built a two-story limestone farmhouse similar to the former family home in the French Basque Country, and a brick-lined pond collecting the spring's outflow and shaped like a Spanish guitar. The Garnier brothers also raised sheep on the property, and were known for the fine quality of their fleece, but they in turn became overextended and lost the property to foreclosure in 1878.

The property changed hands three times in the next twenty years, having been acquired by Simon Gless a Basque who was married to a French woman and four other native women; eventually, he sold the property to his Basque father-in-law, Domingo Amestoy, <Gless family archives>in 1889. The fields were used for wheat farming, as was most of the Valley after Isaac Newton Van Nuys introduced dryland farming there. The Amestoy family lived on the property until 1945, selling off 1,170 acres (5 km^{2}) of land in 1916 that would become the community of Encino, and further subdividing the ranchlands thereafter.

In a story typical of the San Fernando Valley's rapid urbanization, the adobe was used as the sales office for the post-war subdivisions surrounding it—and was to be torn down and used as commercial property. Concerned neighbors led a fight to have the adobe, and the spring, to be purchased by the State of California.

The last remaining parcel, including the historic buildings and the spring, was acquired by the state of California in 1949.

== Los Encinos State Historic Park ==
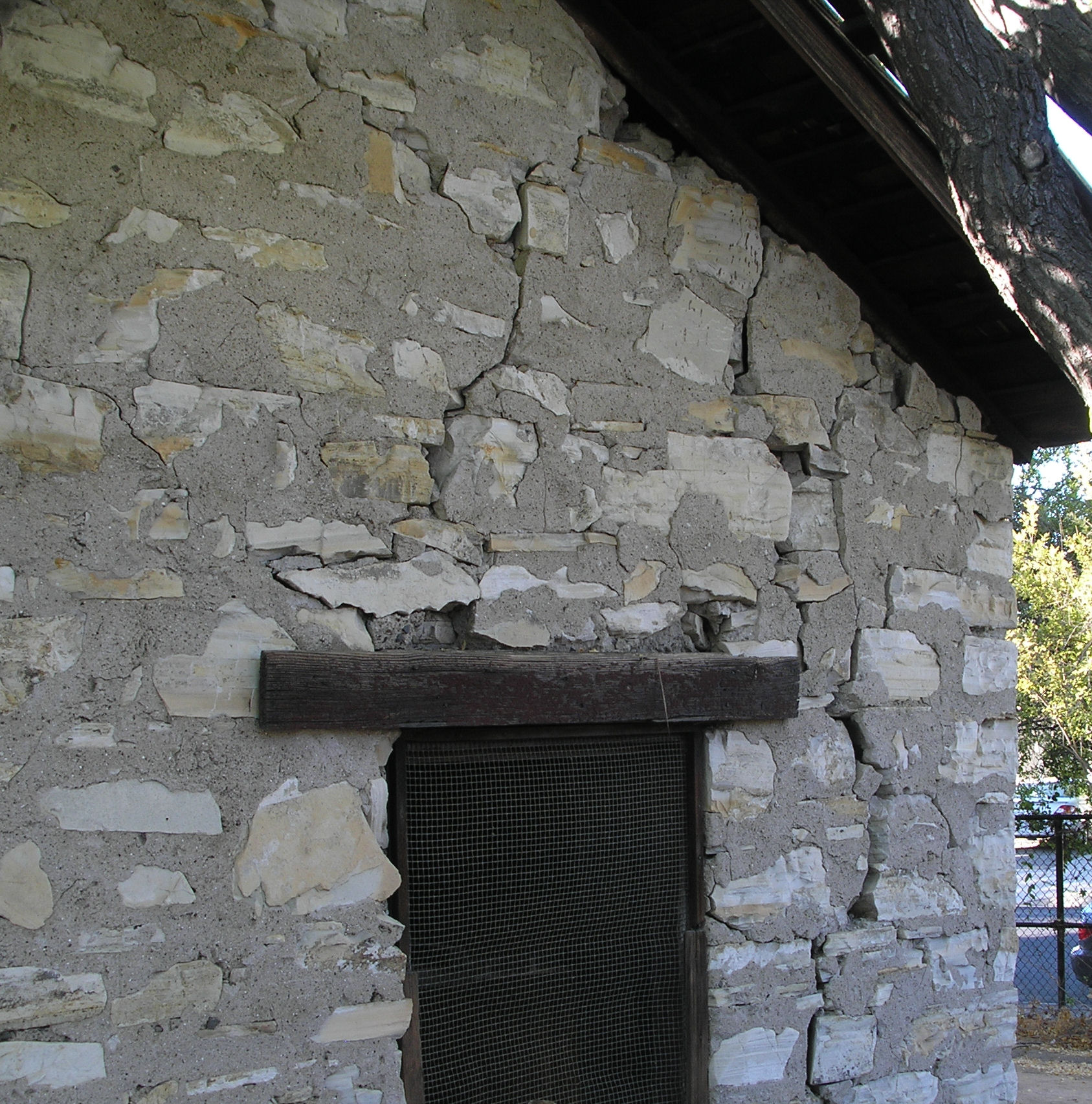
1994 earthquake-damaged Amestoy storage building at Rancho Los Encinos.

All of the historic buildings in the park were heavily damaged in the 1994 Northridge earthquake. The De la Osa adobe and the stone Garnier building have been repaired and restored, with the Garnier building now serving as a visitor center with historic photographs and exhibits of the rancho's past. The Los Encinos Photos archives are also online. The 1902 river stones and mortar walled, double-roofed, food-cool storage buildings built for the Amestoys still show signs of the earthquake and are used for Park storage.

A major Tongva village or rancheria site, carbon-dated at over 3,000 years old, was discovered in 1984 directly across Ventura Boulevard during excavation for a new structure. Archeologists found two million artifacts, such as lithic stone tools, shel and stone beads, and arrowheads, and ancient burial remains. The park displays some of the pre-contact artifacts.

In 2011, the State of California threatened to close the park, because the park makes no revenue to equalize the employees needed. Through community effort and the Encino Neighborhood Council, an anonymous donor was found who volunteered $150,000 (pending as of 1/12) to keep the park open.

The park is located at 16756 Moorpark Street, Encino, California, 91436-1068, and is open to the public 10 AM to 5 PM, Wednesday through Sunday. There is a pedestrian entrance on Ventura Boulevard.

== Map gallery ==
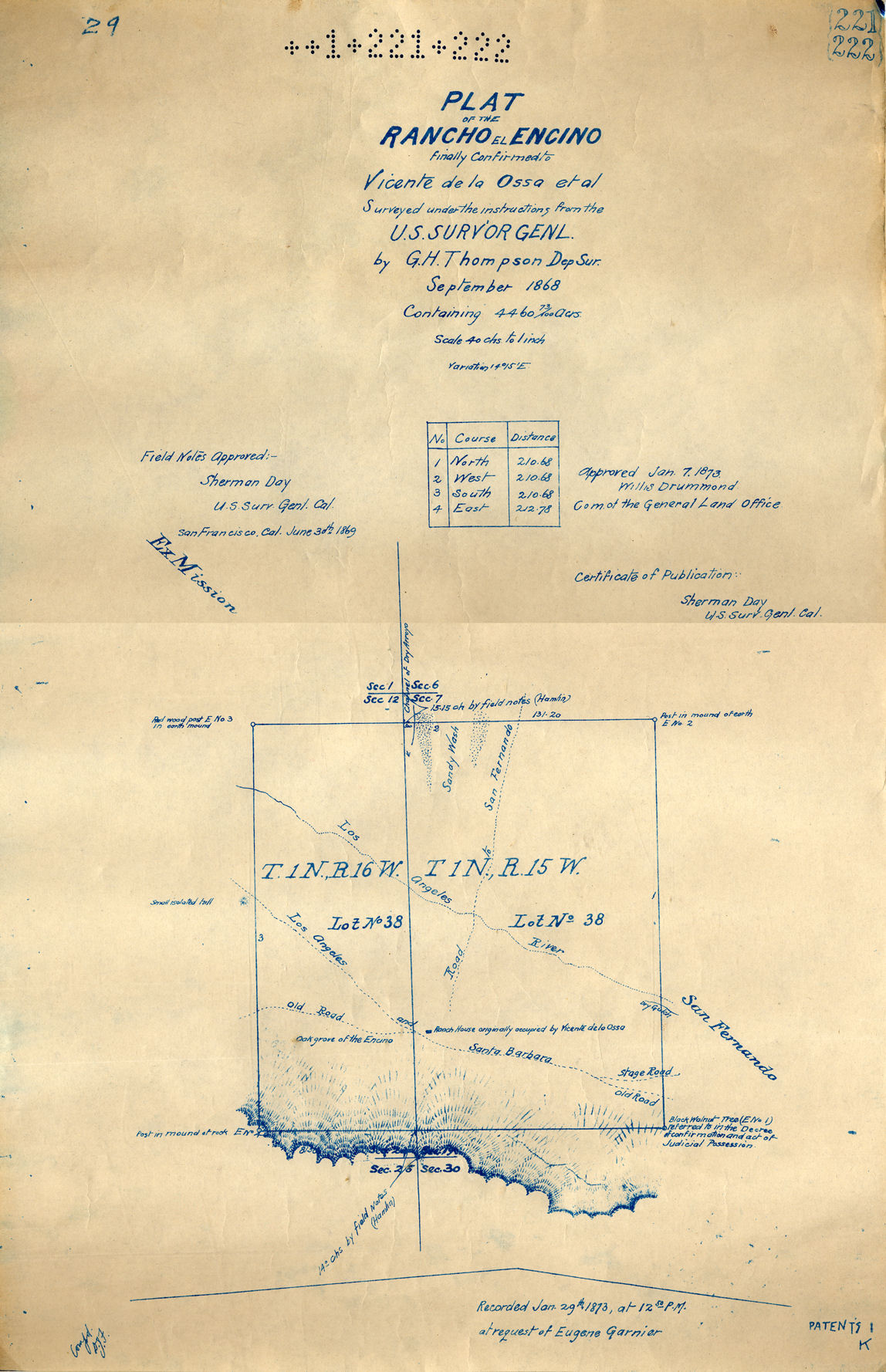
Plat map of Rancho Los Encinos, based on an 1868 survey and registered for Eugene Garnier in 1873.

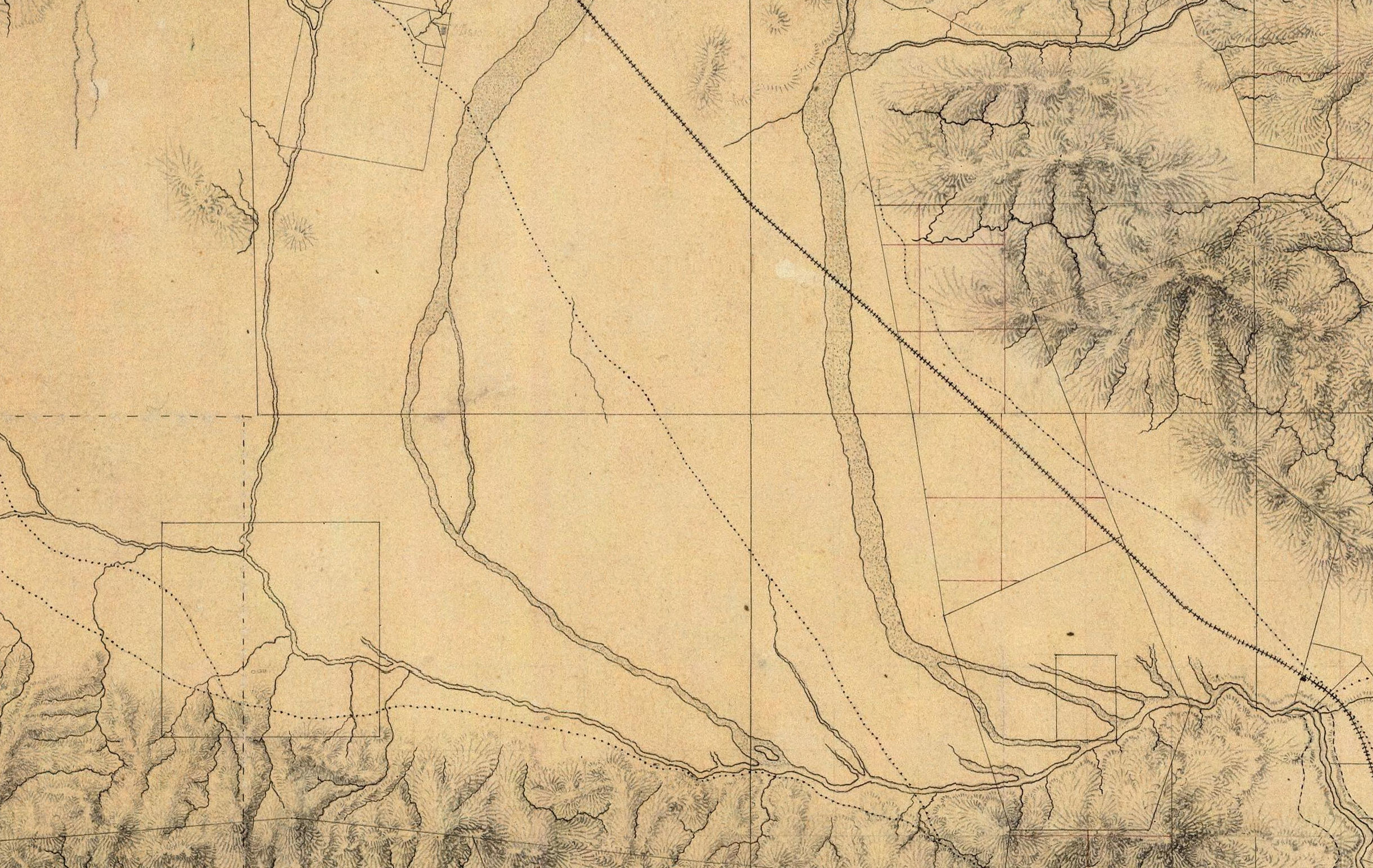
1880 manuscript map of the southeastern San Fernando Valley, with Rancho Los Encinos at the lower left and the Los Angeles River running southeast through the property.

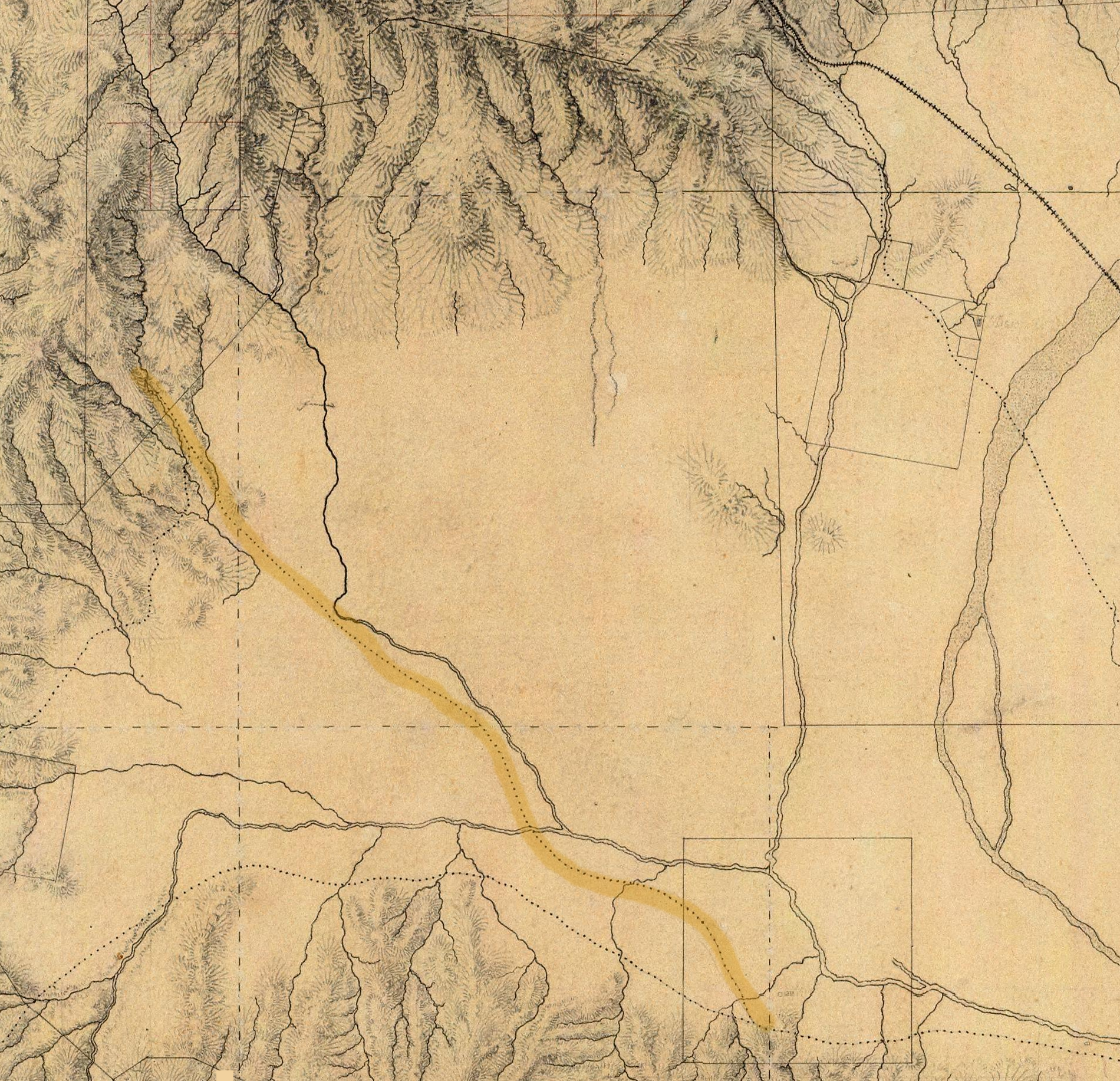
The Butterfield Overland Mail stagecoach route highlighted from Rancho Los Encinos (bottom) to the Santa Susana Pass (upper left), on 1880 manuscript map of the western San Fernando Valley.

== See also ==
- Ranchos of California
  - List of Ranchos of California
    - Ranchos of Los Angeles County
- History of the San Fernando Valley to 1915
- List of Los Angeles Historic-Cultural Monuments in the San Fernando Valley
- National Register of Historic Places listings in Los Angeles, California
- National Register of Historic Places listings in Los Angeles County, California
- History of Los Angeles, California
