= Ventura Boulevard =

Thoroughfare in San Fernando Valley

- Part of El Camino Real
- Interactive map of Ventura Boulevard
- Namesake: Saint Bonaventure
- Maintained by: Los Angeles County, City of Los Angeles
- Length: 16.5 mi (26.6 km)
- Nearest metro station: Universal City/Studio City
- West end: Valley Circle Boulevard in Woodland Hills
- Major junctions: SR 27; I-405; US 101
- East end: Lankershim Boulevard and Cahuenga Boulevard by Universal City

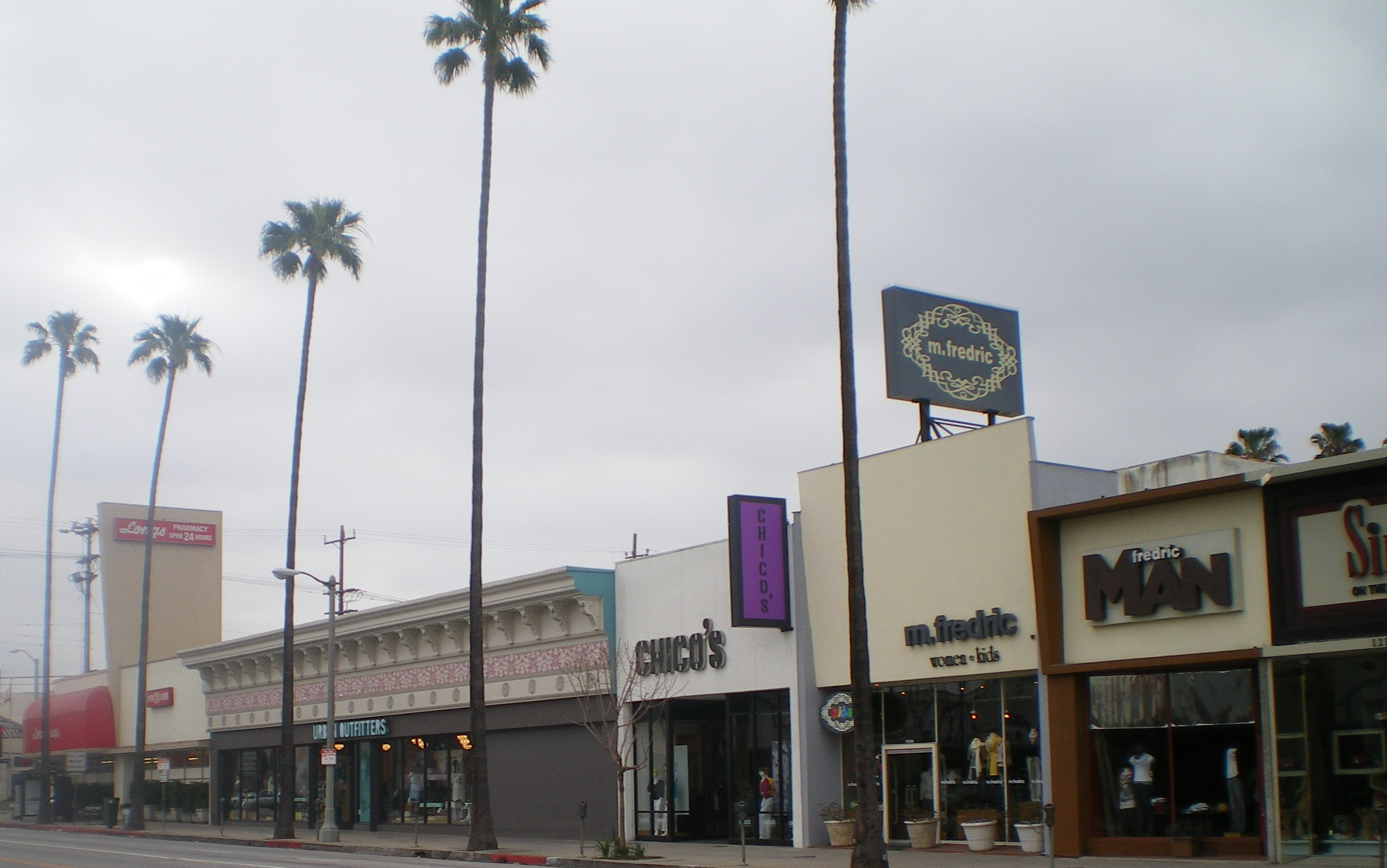
Studio City Shopping District

Ventura Boulevard is one of the primary east–west thoroughfares in the San Fernando Valley region of the City of Los Angeles, California. Ventura Boulevard is one of the oldest routes in the San Fernando Valley as it is along the commemorative route El Camino Real. It was also U.S. Route 101 (US 101) before the freeway (which it parallels for much of Ventura Boulevard's length) was built, and it was also previously signed as U.S. Route 101 Business (US 101 Bus.).

Approximately 18 miles (29 km) long, Ventura Boulevard begins near Calabasas in Woodland Hills at an intersection with Valley Circle Boulevard. The Boulevard travels through Tarzana, Encino, and Sherman Oaks before intersecting with Lankershim Boulevard in Studio City, where it becomes Cahuenga Boulevard and winds through Cahuenga Pass into Hollywood.

Historically, the street has been one of the most concentrated location for small businesses and shops in the Valley, while today it has pockets of housing, mini-malls, and shops, along with a wide assortment of businesses, schools, and other establishments. Houses south of Ventura Boulevard are considered to be among the most expensive in Los Angeles County, ranging from $2 million to $50 million and home to numerous executives, celebrities, athletes, and other entertainers.

== Name ==
Ventura Boulevard is named after Saint Bonaventure.

== History ==
Ventura Boulevard follows an ancient pre-Columbian trading trail that served the Tataviam and Tongva village of Siutcanga, which is at least 4,000 years old.

Due to natural springs in the area, one of the first inhabited areas of the San Fernando Valley was the land around what is now known as Los Encinos State Historic Park, at the corner of Balboa and Ventura boulevards, which was inhabited by the Tongva for thousands of years. This 5-acre (2 hm²) park now includes the original nine-room De La Osa Adobe (built in 1849) and a reservoir shaped like a Spanish guitar that collects the springwater.

The Valley's first golf course opened at the corner of Ventura and Coldwater Canyon in 1922 (this is now the site of the Sportsmen's Lodge).

Also in 1922, around the area of Canoga Avenue south of Ventura Boulevard, Victor Girard purchased 2,886 acres (12 km²) of land and planted over 120,000 pepper, sycamore, and eucalyptus trees, later resulting in the appropriately named Woodland Hills.

In 1928, just a couple blocks east of Laurel Canyon, Mack Sennett created his 38-acre (15.4 hm²) Keystone Studios, which produced silent movies with stars such as Fatty Arbuckle, W.C. Fields, Stan Laurel, and the Keystone Cops. After talkies, Keystone became Republic Pictures, and then in 1963 CBS Studio Center. Although closed to the public, this complex, which is located only a few blocks away from Ventura Boulevard, probably makes more TV sitcoms than any other studio.

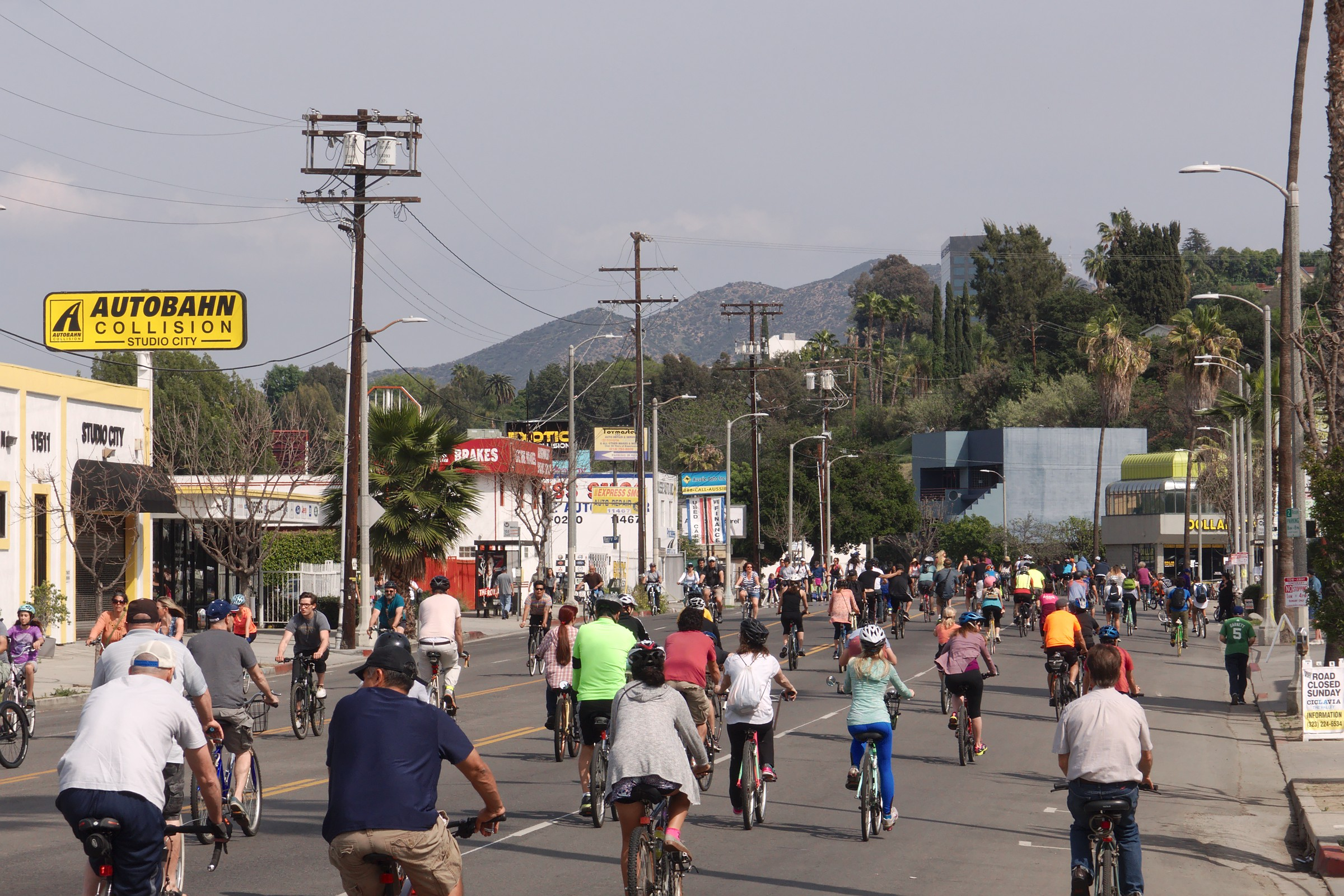
Looking eastward during CicLAvia, March 2015

In 2015 the Studio City section of Ventura Boulevard, along with Lankershim Boulevard, was the site of CicLAvia, an event sponsored by the Los Angeles County Metropolitan Transportation Authority in which major roads are temporarily closed to motorized vehicle traffic and used for recreational human-powered transport.

A stretch of the former U.S. Route 101 in the Ventura County city of Camarillo paralleling the current freeway route is also named Ventura Boulevard.

== Public transportation ==
Ventura Boulevard carries Metro Local lines 150 and 240.

== In popular culture ==
=== Music ===
The Everly Brothers recorded a song called "Ventura Boulevard" on their 1968 album Roots.

Ventura Boulevard is mentioned in Tom Petty's song "Free Fallin'" ("All the vampires walkin' through the valley, Move west down Ventura Boulevard..."). When Petty died in 2017, what was intended as a walk by four fans turned into a public memorial as 10 times that many ‘Vampires’ walked west down the Boulevard in memory of the singer.

The Boulevard is also mentioned in Frank Zappa's "Valley Girl" ("On Ventura, there she goes, she just bought some bitchin' clothes") a song about a valley girl (voiced by his daughter Moon Zappa) who lives in Encino and participates in typical Valley Girl activities such as shopping at The Galleria, not wanting to do the dishes, and getting her toenails professionally pedicured.

Guitarist John 5 made a song entitled "18969 Ventura Blvd."

In the documentary Living with Michael Jackson, it is revealed that Michael Jackson wrote the song Billie Jean while riding down Ventura Boulevard in his car.

Haim's music video "Want You Back" is filmed on Ventura Boulevard.

In August 2025, Lil Nas X was filmed walking down the street in the middle of the night, almost completely naked in white underpants and white boots, whilst repeatedly asking the cameraman if they were 'coming to the party tonight'. Lil Nas X was later arrested and ended up in hospital.

=== Film ===
The boulevard is a prominent location in the movie The 40-Year-Old Virgin. Much of the films Crash and Transformers were filmed on the boulevard.

=== Television ===
In the Seinfeld episode "The Trip, Part 2", Jerry and George were said to be calling from a pay phone on Ventura Boulevard. In reality, the pay phone shown was on Ventura Place, about one block away.

In the Treehouse of Horror VI episode of The Simpsons, Ventura Boulevard features as the location of the show's first ever live-action scene.

Steve Allen, who lived in Encino, famously joked that "The Valley is the hippest part of town. They even named a boulevard after Charlie Ventura," referring to the renowned jazz saxophonist.

=== Literature ===
Detective fiction author Raymond Chandler on Ventura Boulevard from his novel The Little Sister (1949):

At La Brea I turned north and swung over to Highland, out over Cahuenga Pass and on to Ventura Boulevard, past Studio City and Sherman Oaks and Encino. There was nothing lonely about the trip. There never is on that road. Fast boys in stripped-down Fords shot in and out of the traffic streams, missing fenders by a sixteenth of an inch, but somehow always missing them. Tired men in dusty coupés and sedans winced and tightened their grip on the wheel and ploughed on north and west towards home and dinner...I drove past the gaudy neon’s and the false fronts behind them, the sleazy hamburger joints that look like palaces under the colors, the circular drive-ins as gay as circuses with chipper hard-eye car-hops...Behind Encino an occasional light winked...from the homes of screen stars. Screen stars, phooey...”

=== Video games ===
Video game developer Infinity Ward, which developed most of the games in the Call of Duty series, has its headquarters on Ventura Boulevard. The studios can be seen at 15821 Ventura Boulevard, Encino.

== Business district ==
The Ventura Business District is the commercial district along and around Ventura Boulevard. Ventura Boulevard and the district run along the northern base of the Santa Monica Mountains. Mission bells have been placed marking the commemorative route of the El Camino Real.

=== Neighborhoods ===
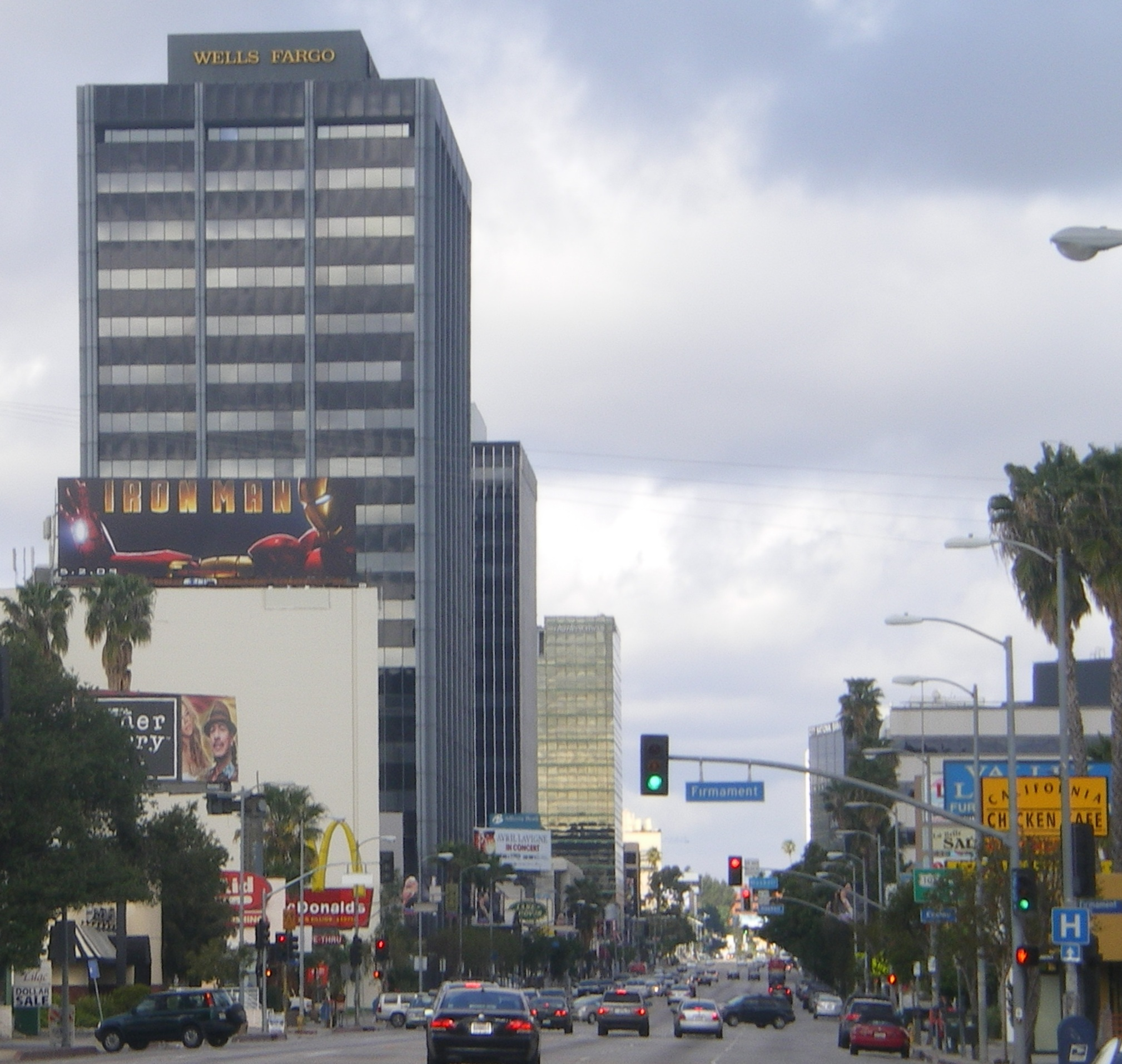
Ventura Boulevard in Encino

Due to the district's extended linear size, it is rare for it to be considered one unified district, instead identified by neighborhoods within and along it. They include:

- Studio City
- Sherman Oaks
- Encino
- Tarzana
- Woodland Hills

== See also ==
- History of the San Fernando Valley to 1915
- Index: San Fernando Valley

== Gallery of places along Ventura Boulevard (east to west) ==
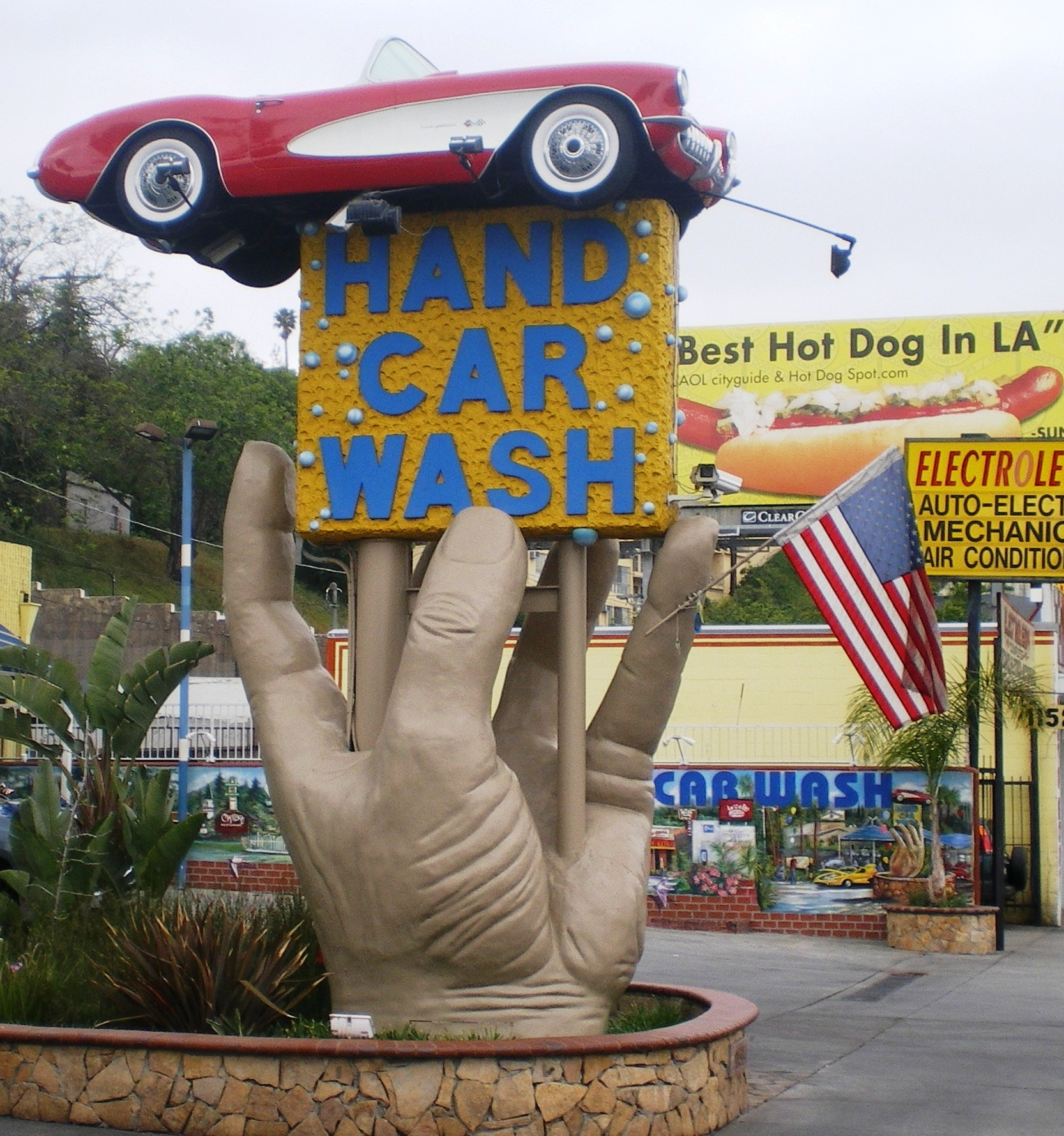
Studio City Hand Car Wash

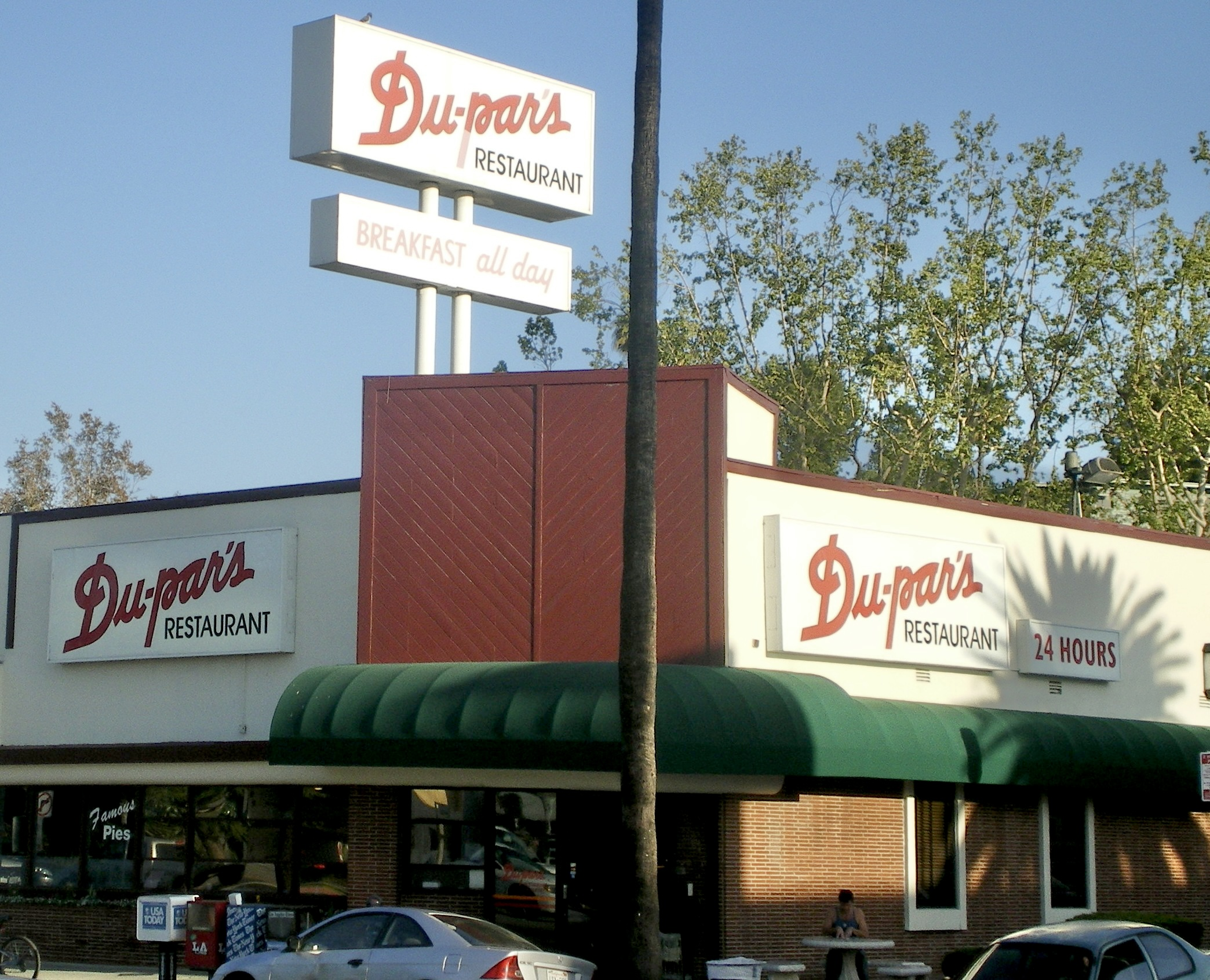
Former Dupar's Restaurant, Studio City

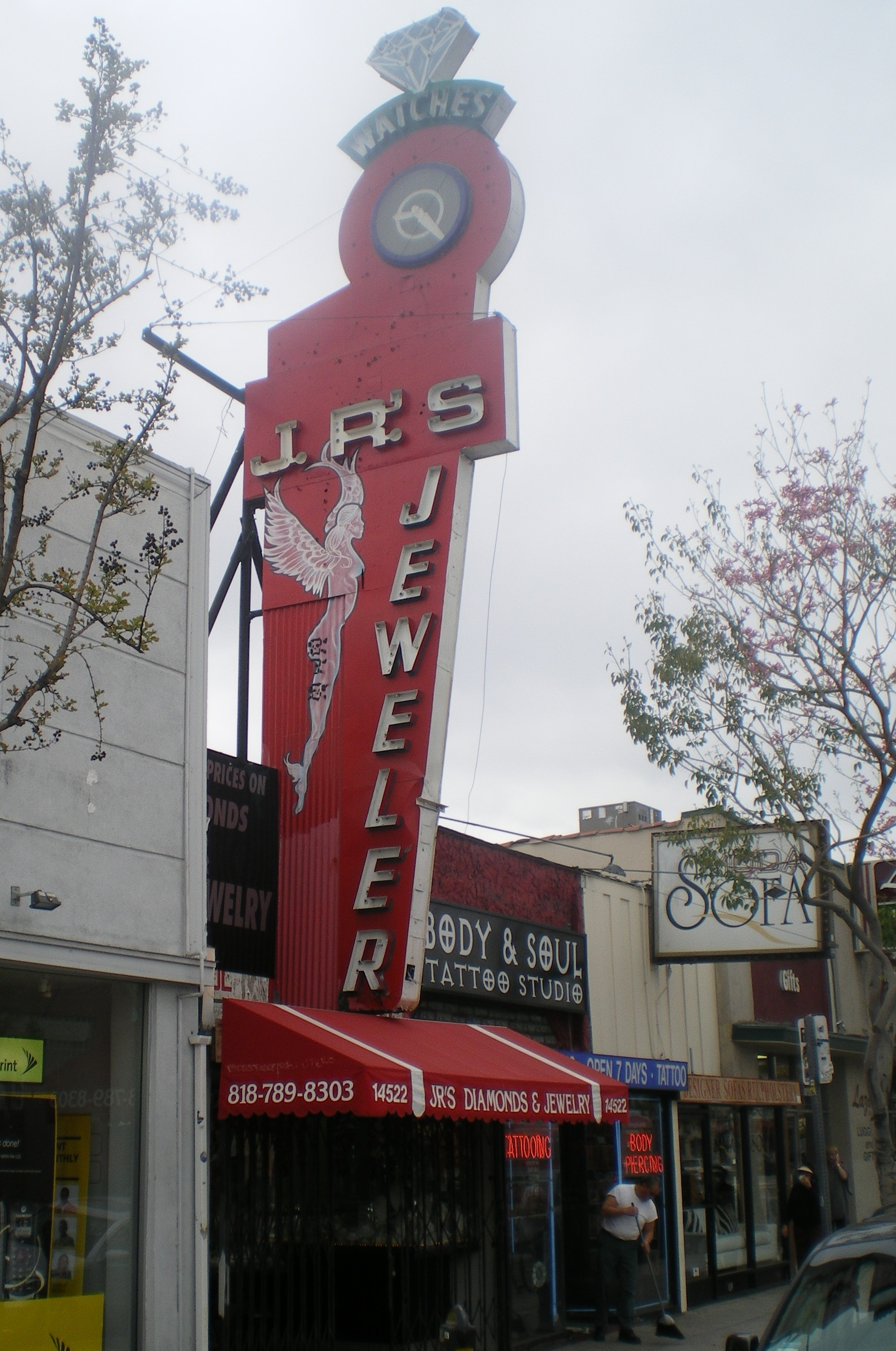
Sherman Oaks Shopping District

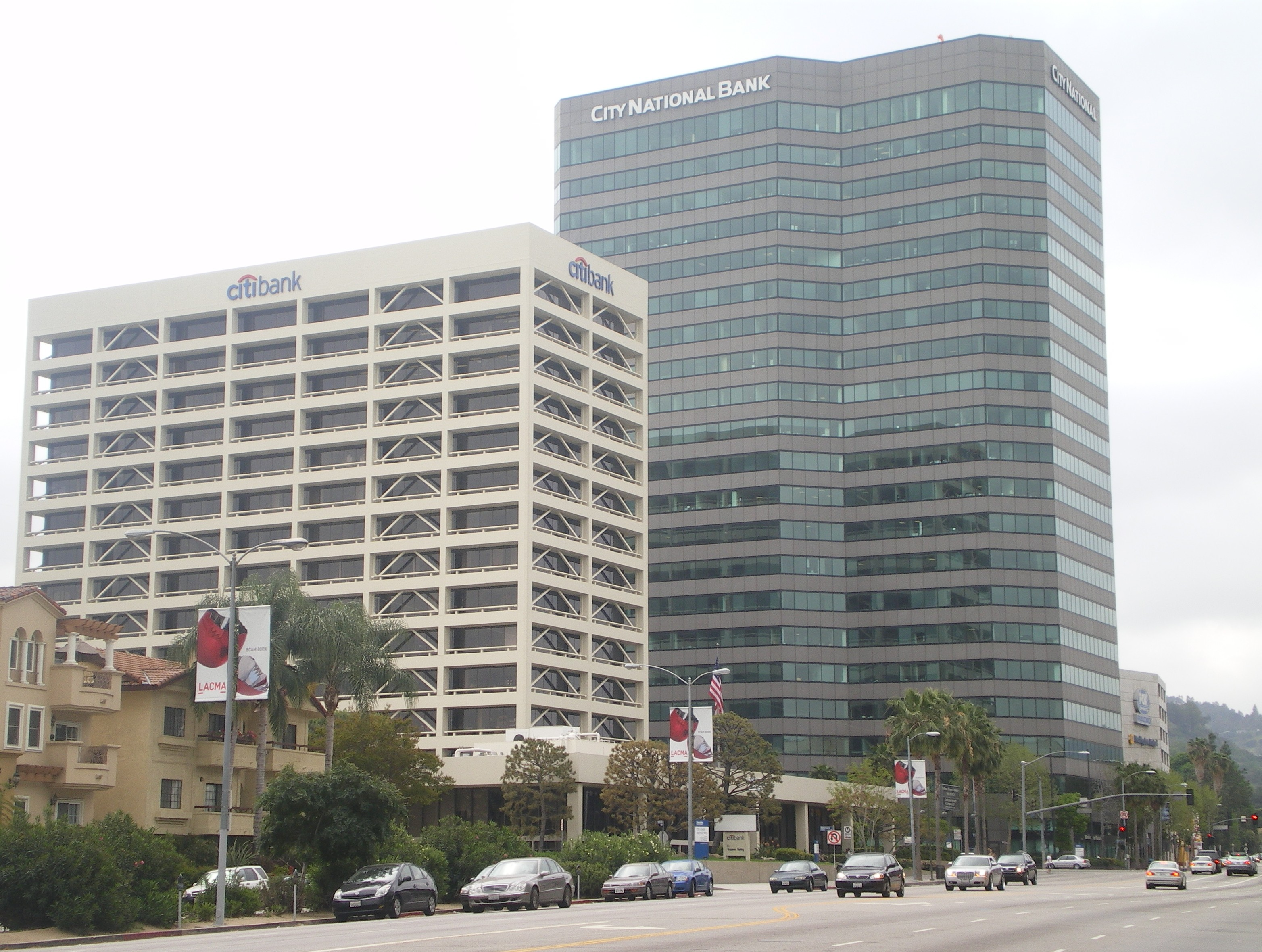
Citibank and City National Bank Buildings

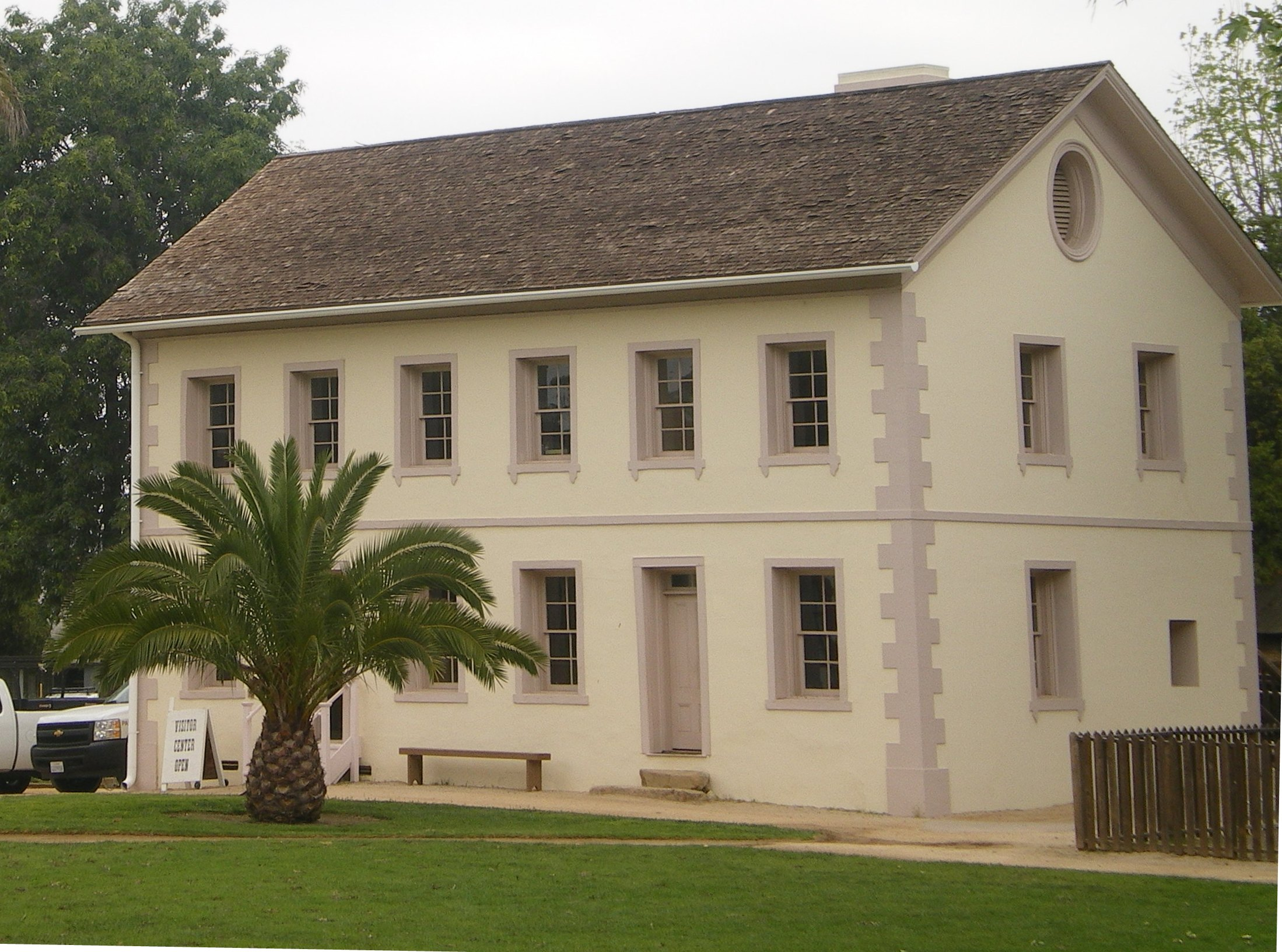
Garnier Building at Rancho Los Encinos, 2008

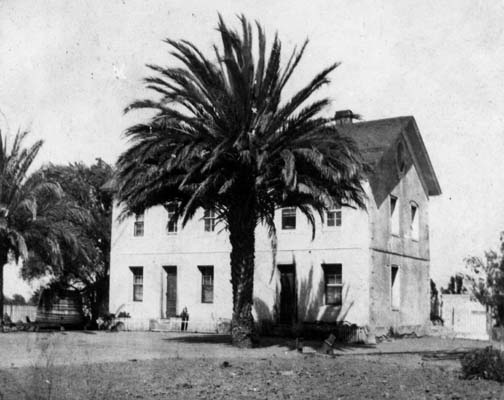
Rancho Encino - Garnier Building, 1900

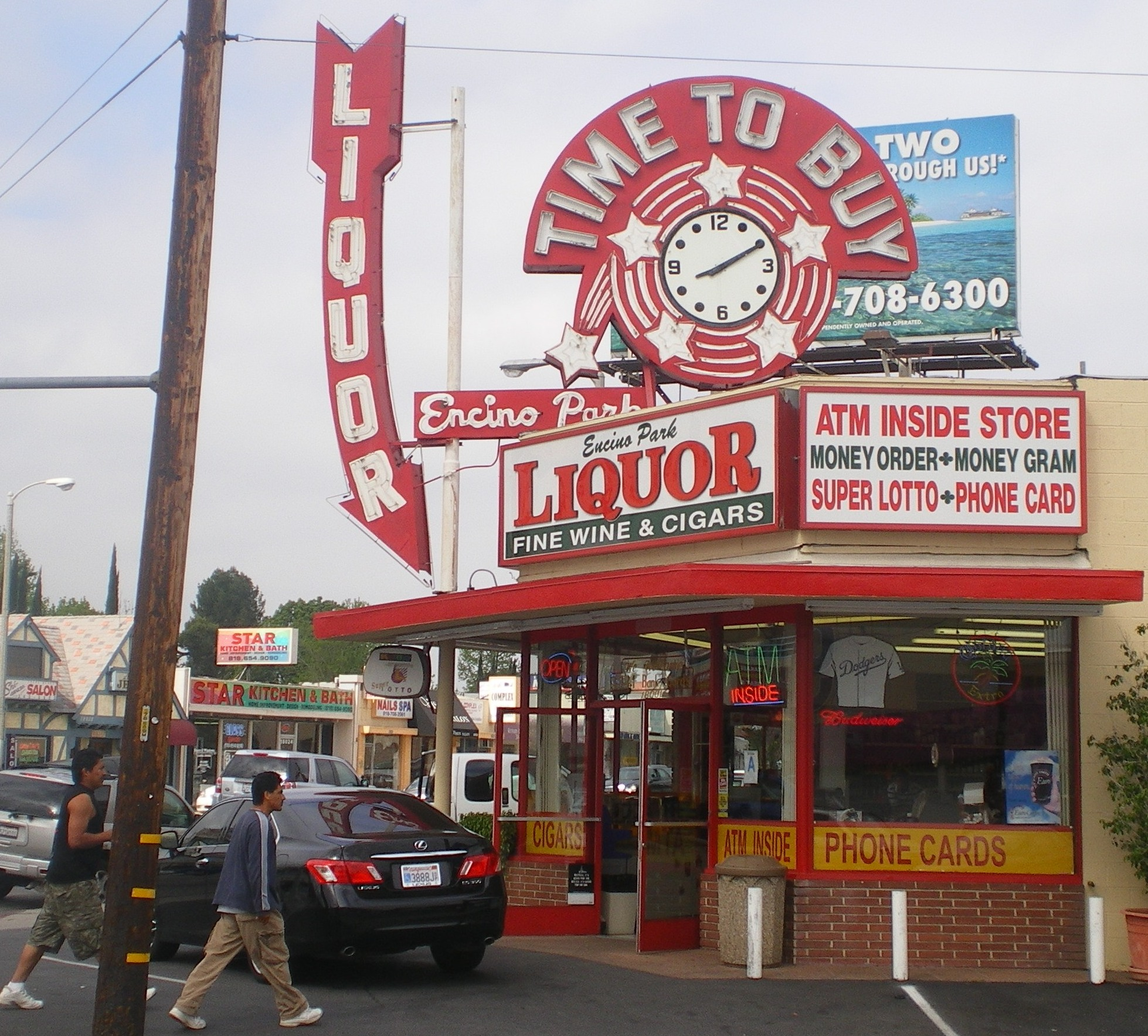
Encino Park Liquor

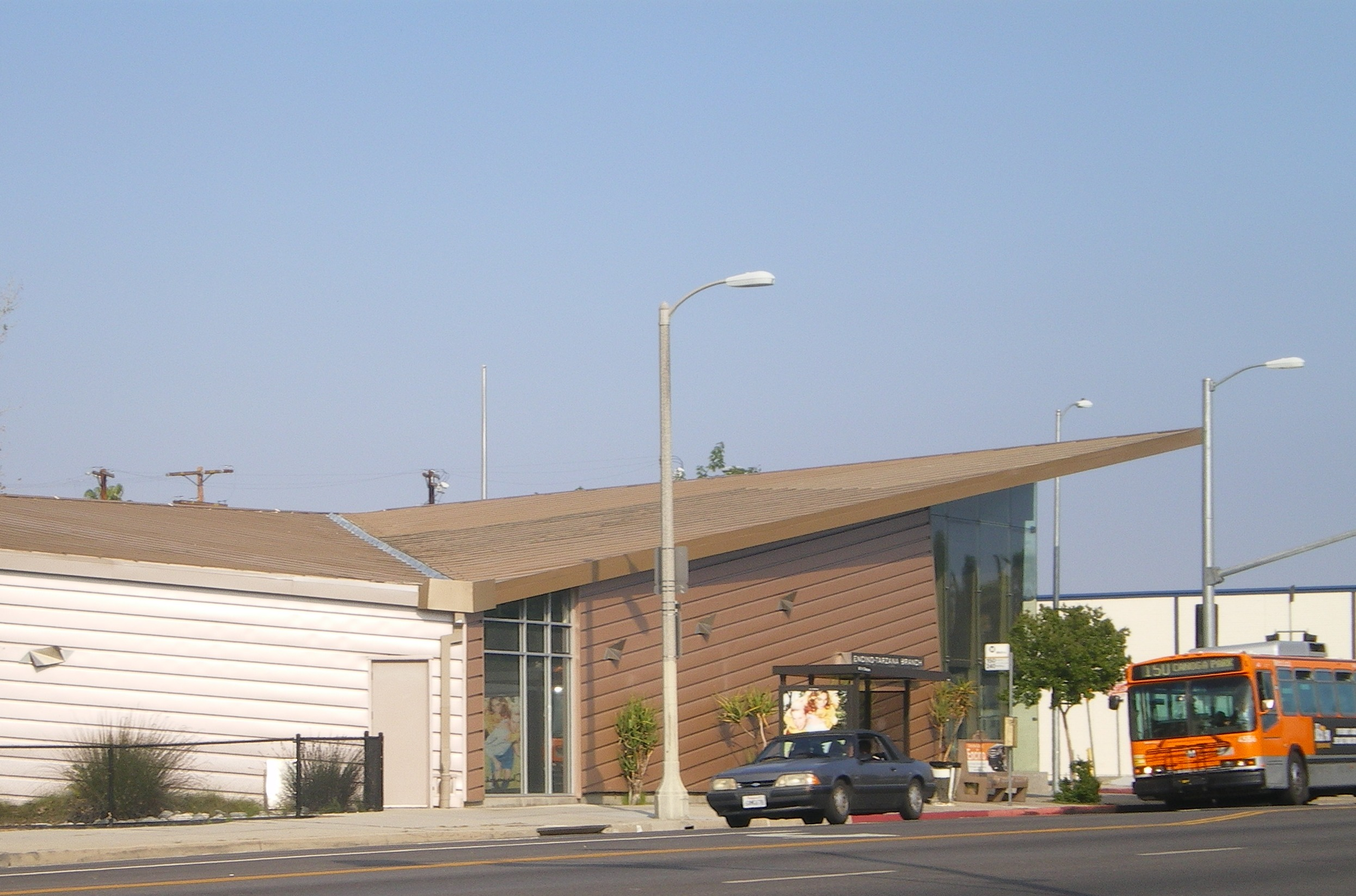
Encino-Tarzana Branch Library

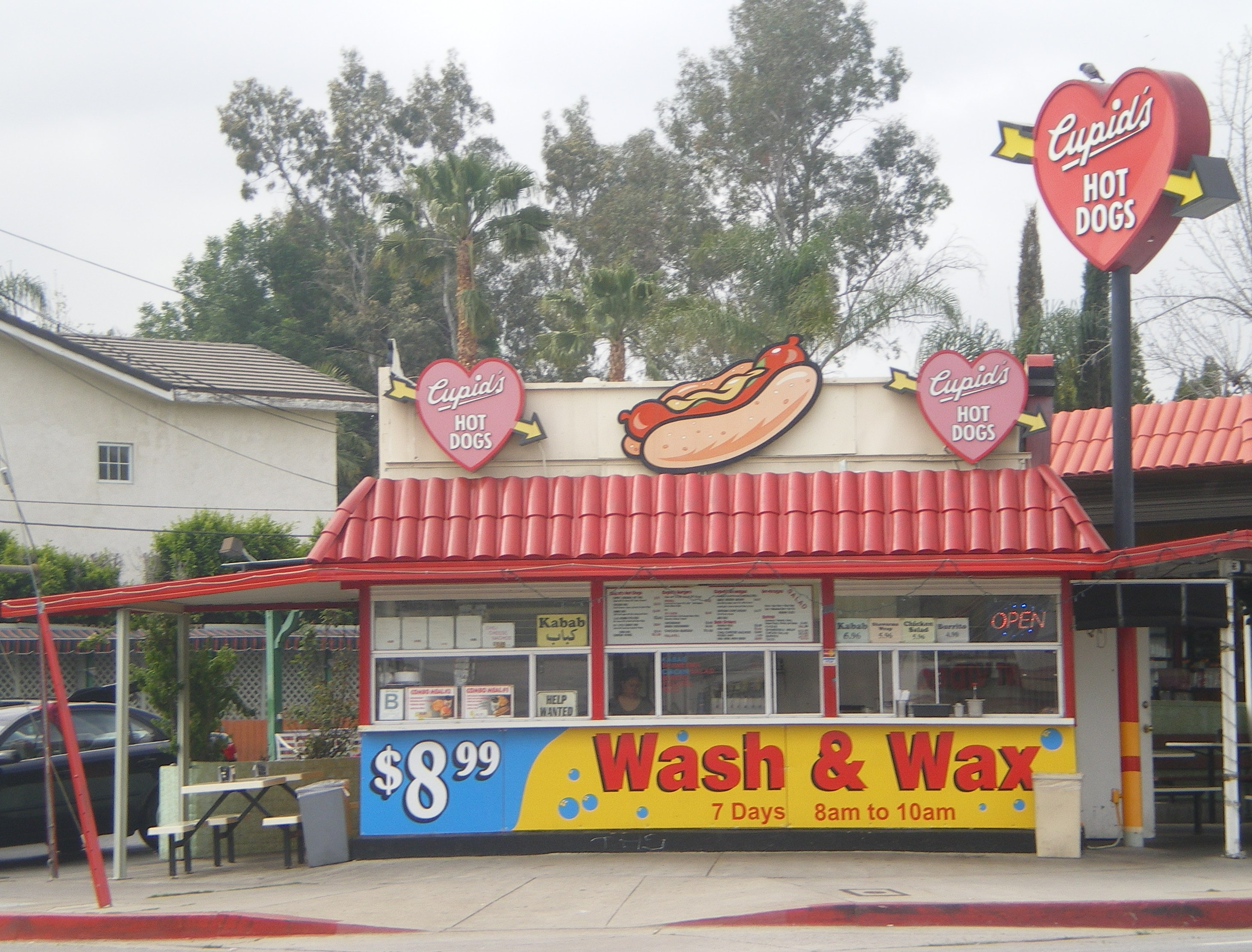
Cupid's Hot Dog's, Tarzana
