= Los Encinos State Historic Park =

State park in Los Angeles County

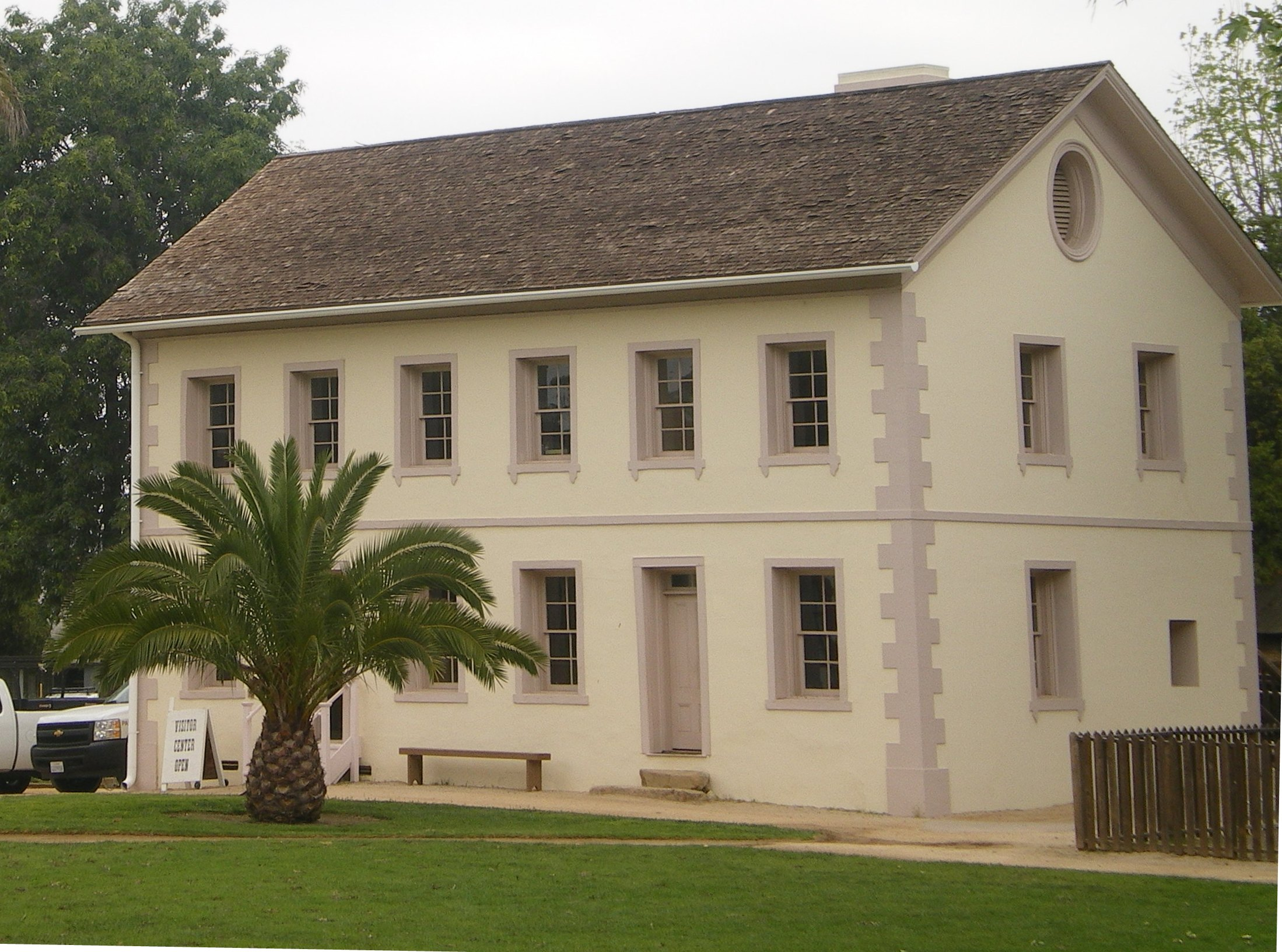
- Garnier Building, 2008

- Location within California Location within the United States
- Location: Los Angeles County, California, United States
- Nearest city: Encino, Los Angeles
- Coordinates: 34°9′37″N 118°29′57″W
- Area: 4.7 acres (1.9 ha)
- Established: 1949
- Governing body: California Department of Parks and Recreation

California Historical Landmark
- Reference no.: 689

Los Encinos State Historic Park is a state park unit of California, preserving buildings of Rancho Los Encinos. The park is located near the corner of Balboa and Ventura Boulevards in Encino, California, in the San Fernando Valley. The rancho includes the original nine-room de la Ossa Adobe, the two-story limestone Garnier building, a blacksmith shop, a natural spring, and a pond. The 4.7-acre (1.9 ha) site was established as a California state park in 1949.

== History ==
The natural spring provided a year-round source of water for the ancient village of Siutcanga, home to the Tongva people, for thousands of years. The name syútkanga actually means "place of the oak" in the Fernandeño language, a dialect of the Tongva language, a name later reflected in Spanish as Los Encinos, or "the oaks" in Spanish. A description of this village was recorded as part of the 1769 Portola Expedition. This Spanish expedition reached the San Fernando Valley and named it "El Valle de Santa Catalina de Bononia de Los Encinos" (The Valley of St. Catherine of Bononia of the Oaks).

Located along a significant travel route between Los Angeles and Santa Barbara, the property passed through many hands between the 1840s and the early 20th century. Today the park contains exhibits related to the agricultural enterprises of Rancho Los Encinos' various owners, including Mission Indian, Californio, French, and French Basque families.

== Springs ==
The Encino Springs are historic artesian springs that were the site of the Siutcanga village of the Tongva-Kizh people, and later provided water for Rancho Los Encinos in what is now the San Fernando Valley region of Los Angeles County, California.

Juan Crespí mentioned the springs in his 1769 diary. In 1845, Manuel Micheltorena's troops camped at the Encino Springs before the Battle of Providencia. The spring reservoirs were apparently built around 1872 by Eugene Garnier. According to a description from 1875 the main ranch spring "supplied a stone reservoir and a bathing pool and yielded about 5 U.S. gallons (19 L; 4.2 imp gal) a minute". An 1890 account described "a number" of springs at Encino "in local use". The springs were carbonated, smelled slightly of hydrogen sulphide, and emerged with a water temperature of about 83–90 °F (28–32 °C) As of 1915, there were two recognized springs on the site, about 30 feet (9.1 m) apart, the smaller spring west of the larger spring, and enclosed in a small reservoir made of stone. According to a U.S. government geologist, the water was associated with a layer of Miocene shale, "which here dips about 25°N" toward the Valley, and was a "primary and secondary alkaline and primary saline water of moderate mineralization". As of 1969 the springs still yielded 24,000 U.S. gallons (91,000 L; 20,000 imp gal) a day, and they were still flowing at Los Encinos State Historic Park as of 1978.

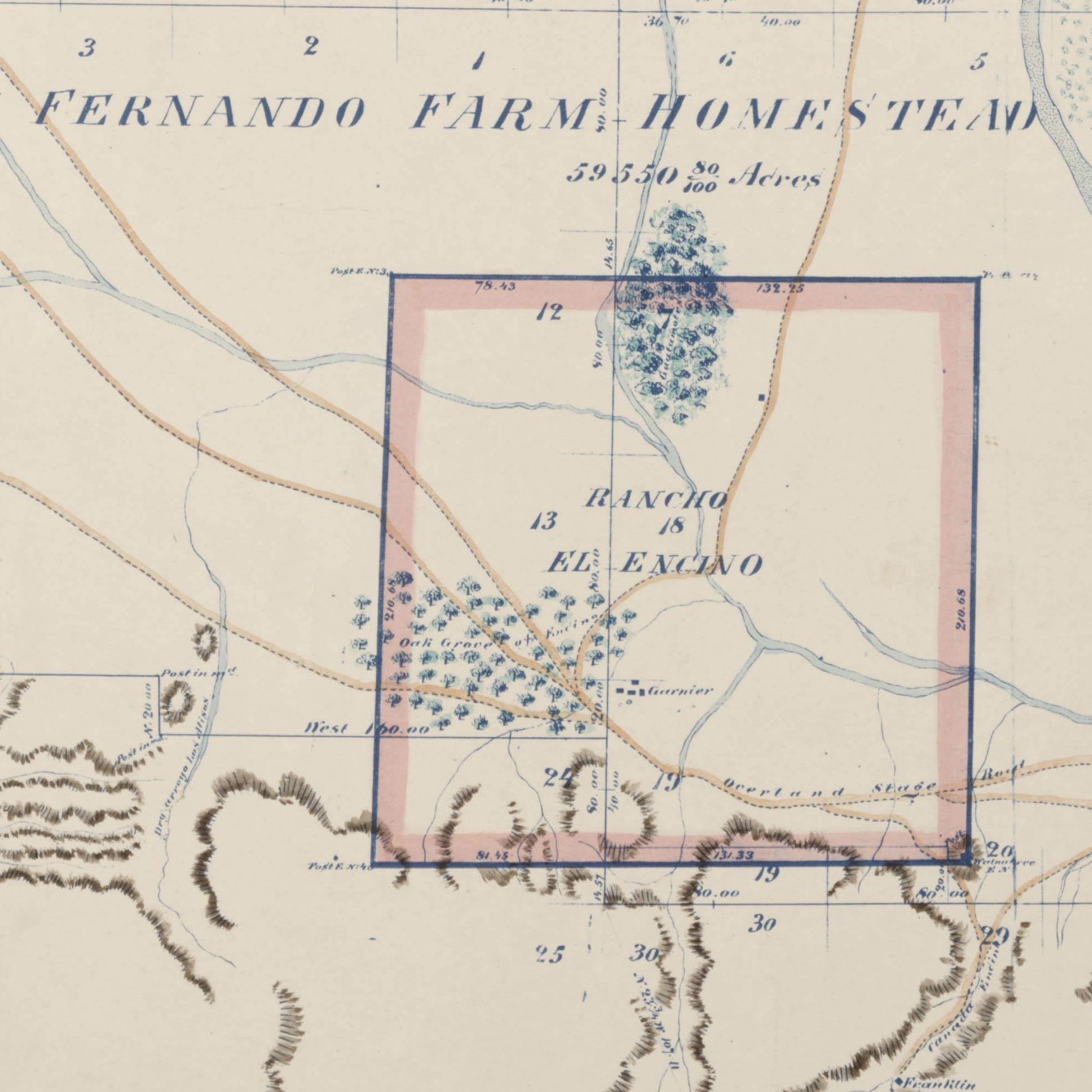
Rancho El Encino mapped in 1871, just before the spring reservoirs were built; the grove on the left is oaks, the grove on the top right, guatamotes, is California seep willow

Upon discovery in 1925 of a grinding stone and possible burial ground west of the springs, archeologist John A. Comstock told a newspaper reporter that "Indians in the Encino Hot Springs vicinity fashioned the finest stone vessels of any Indians In this part of the country with the possible exception of Catalina Island Indians who had a stone particularly adaptable to such purposes". There was an Encino Hot Springs resort in the 1920s.

== California Historical Landmark Marker ==
California Historical Landmark Marker NO. 689 at the site reads:

- NO. 689 LOS ENCINOS STATE HISTORIC PARK - The Franciscan padres used Encino as their headquarters while exploring the valley before establishing Mission San Fernando in 1797. In 1849 Vincente de la Osa built an adobe with nine rooms. The next owner of El Encino Rancho was Eugene Garnier, who built the existing two-story limestone house in 1872. In December 1891 Domingo Amestoy acquired the property.

== Gallery ==
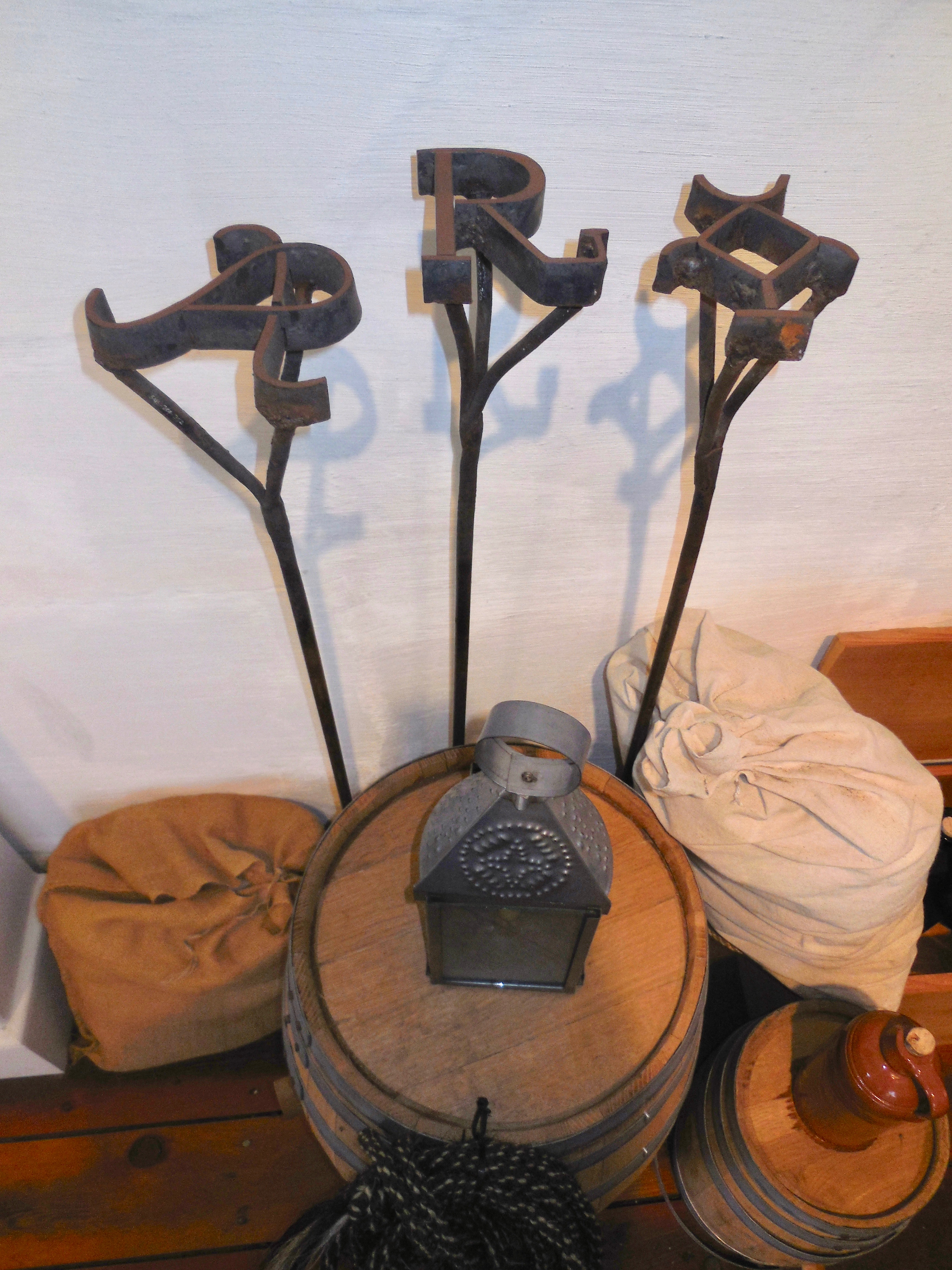
Old cattle brands

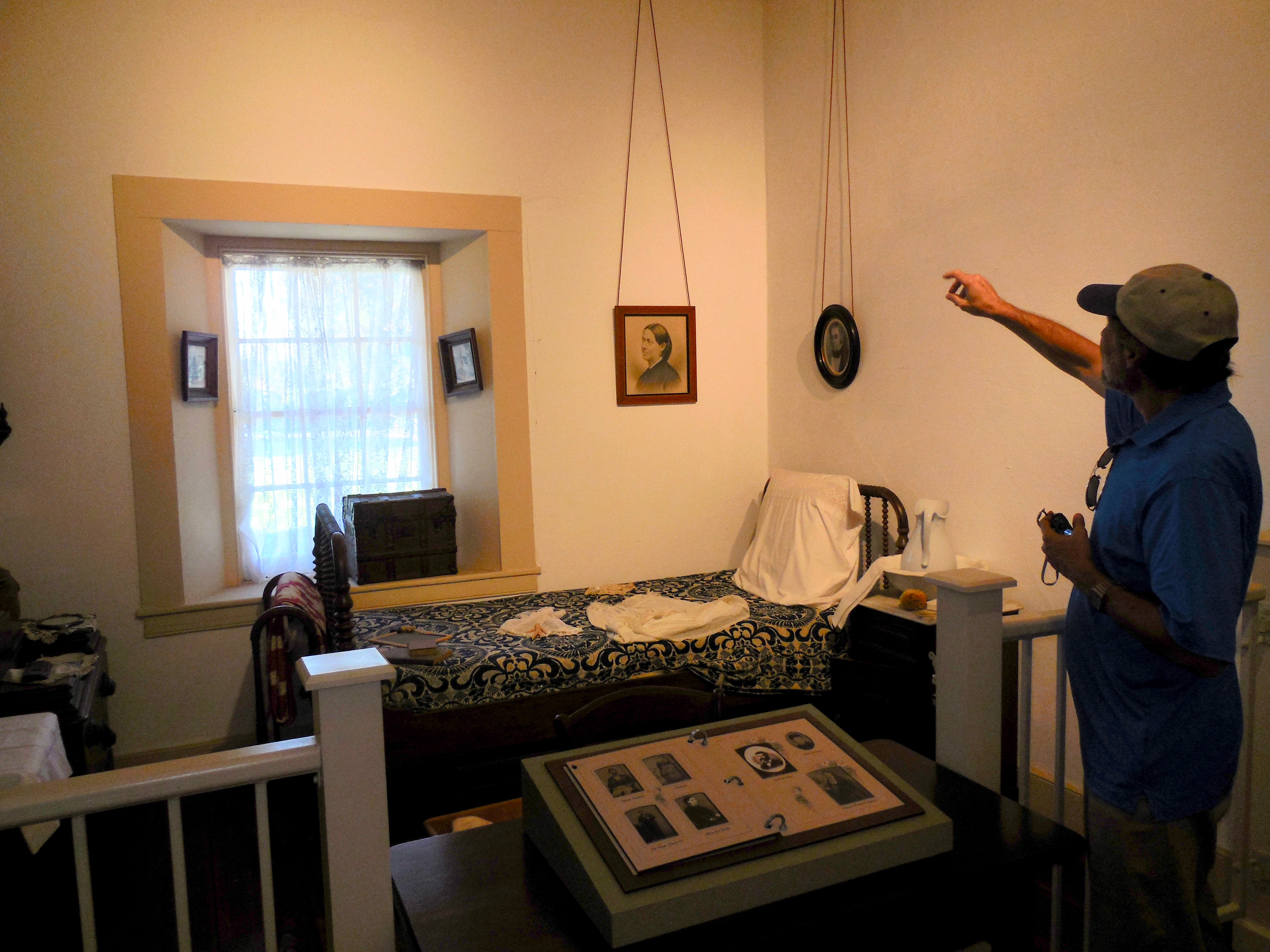
One of the bedrooms

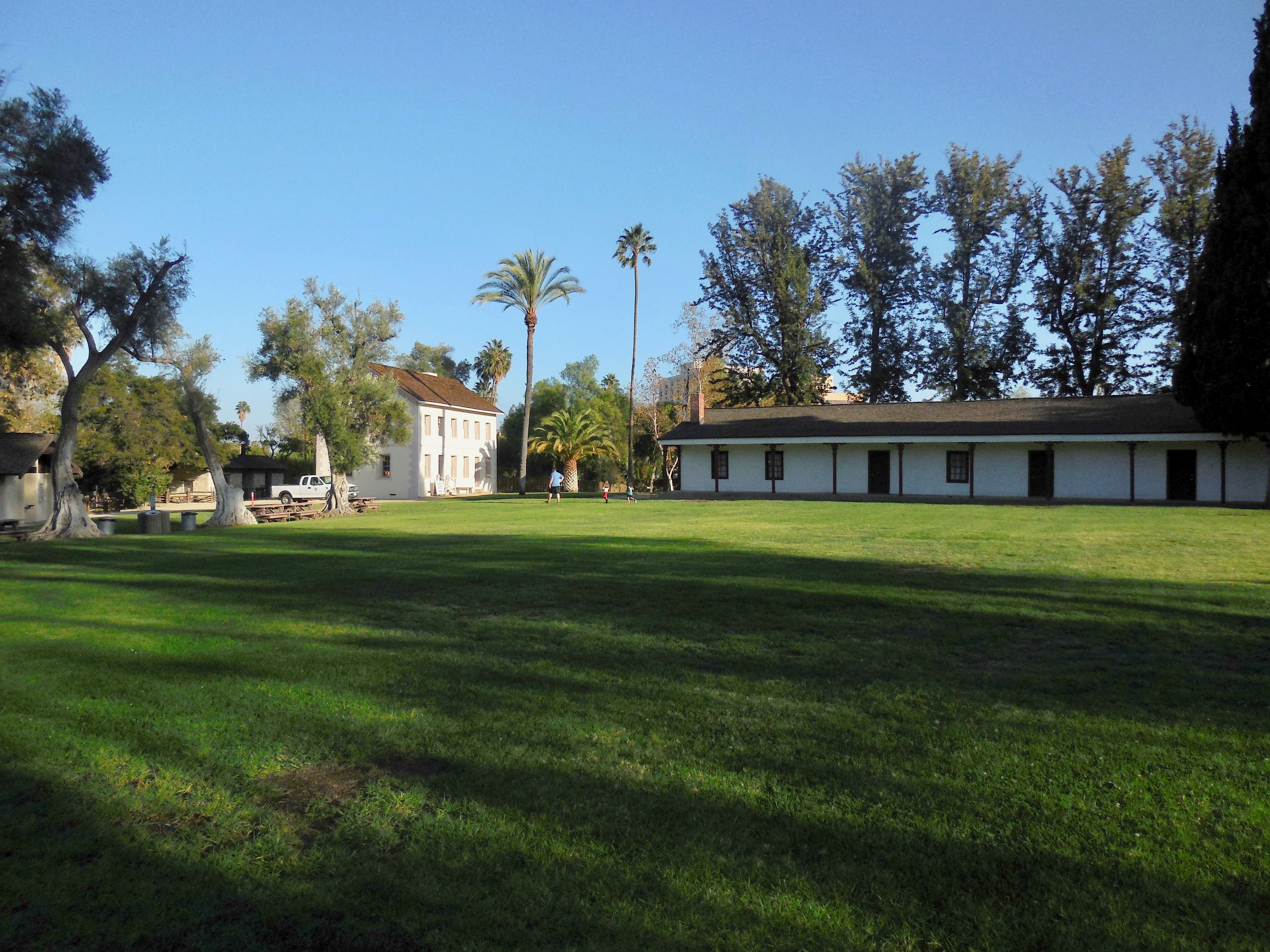
Adobe and French Basque home, facing southeast

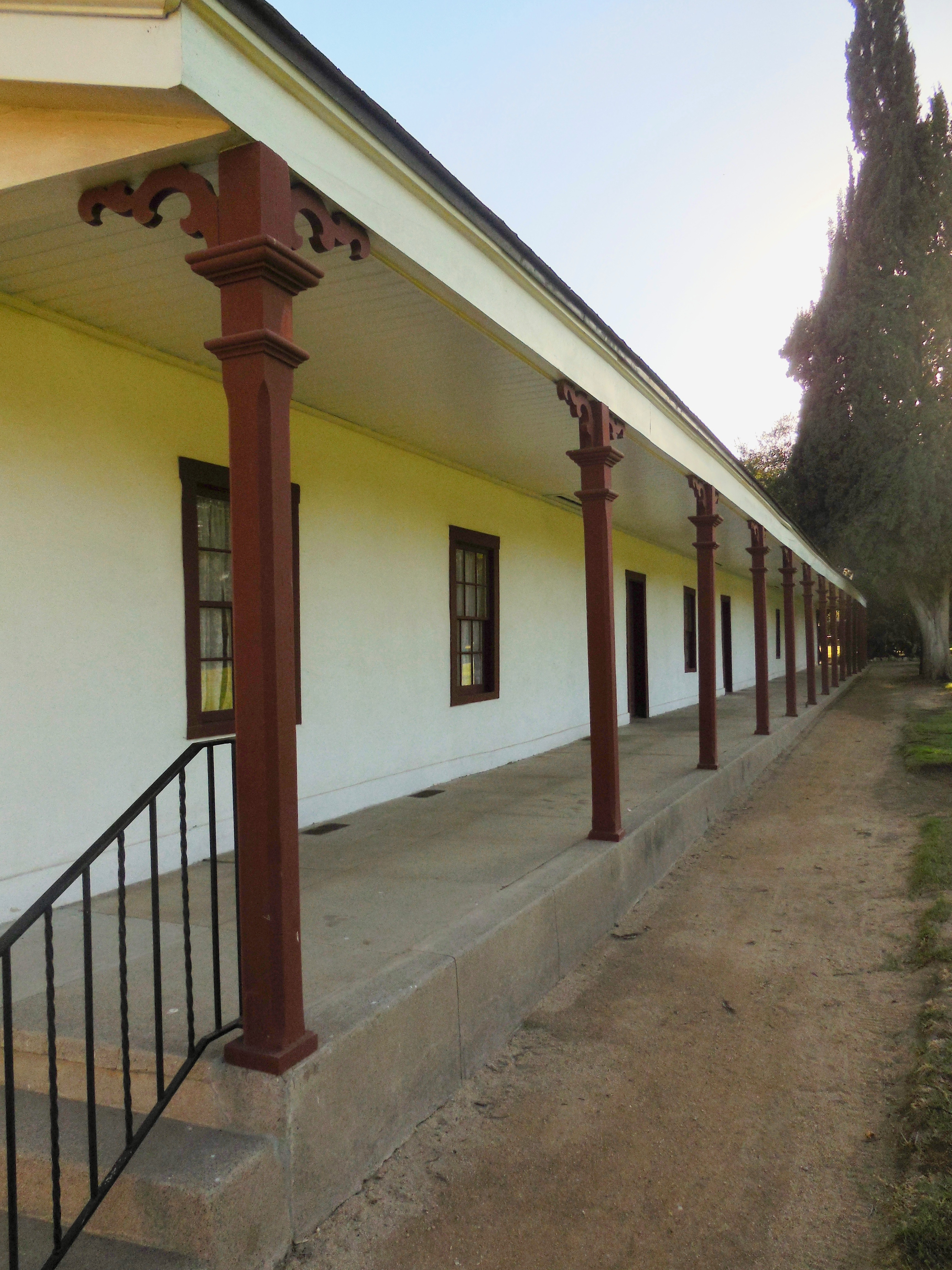
The adobe's south face

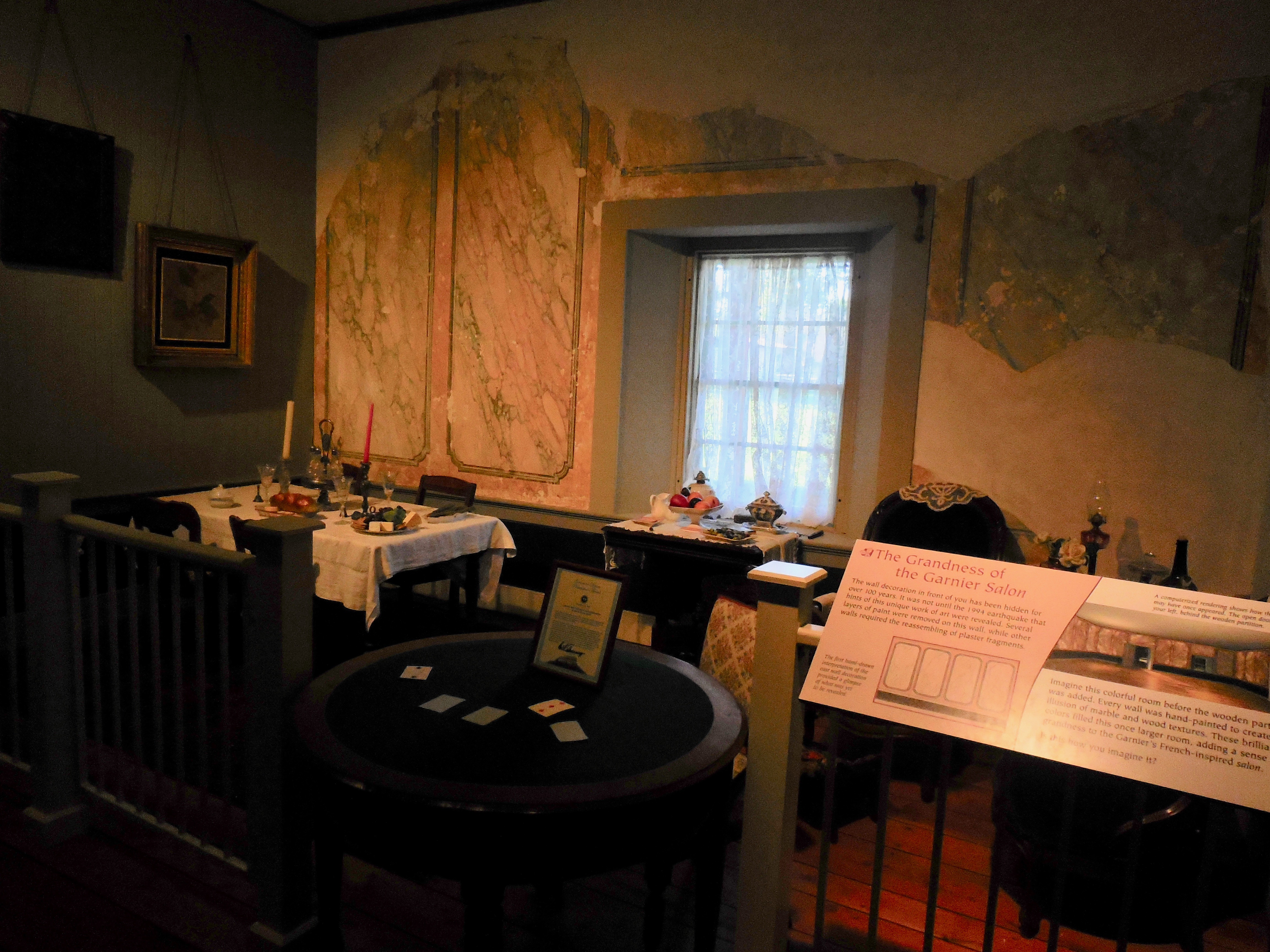
French Basque-era salon

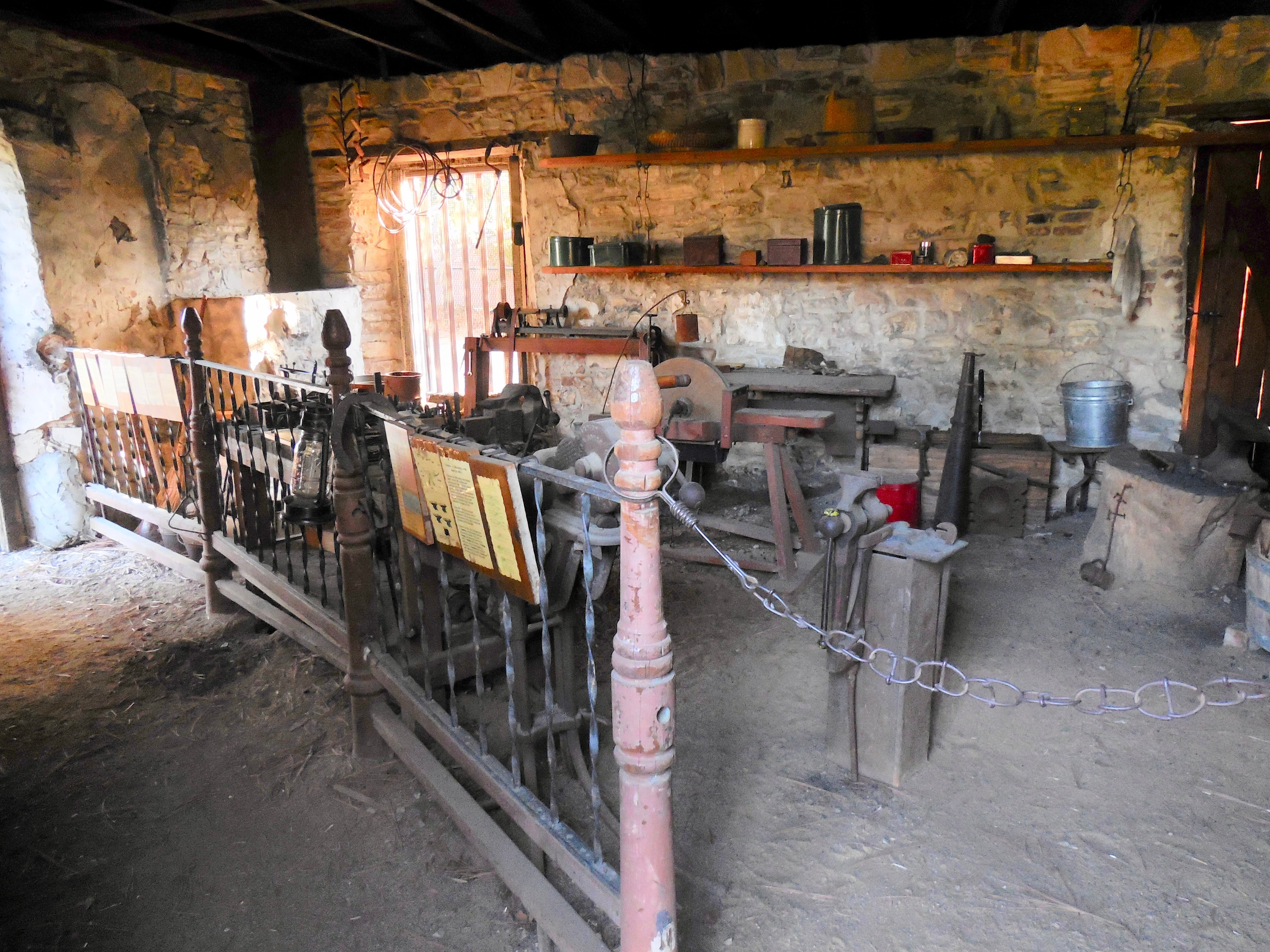
Inside the blacksmith's hut

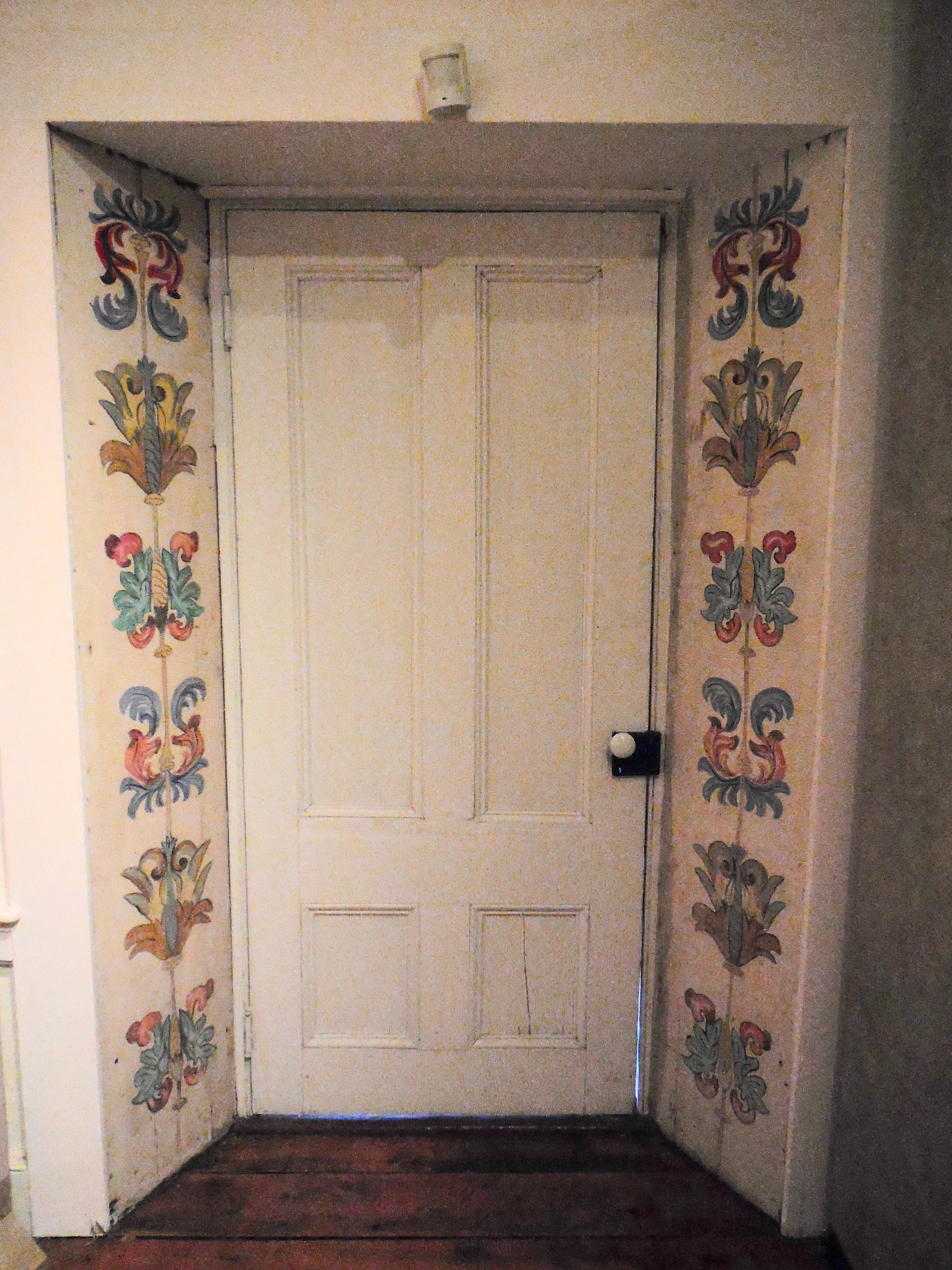
Handpainted doorway

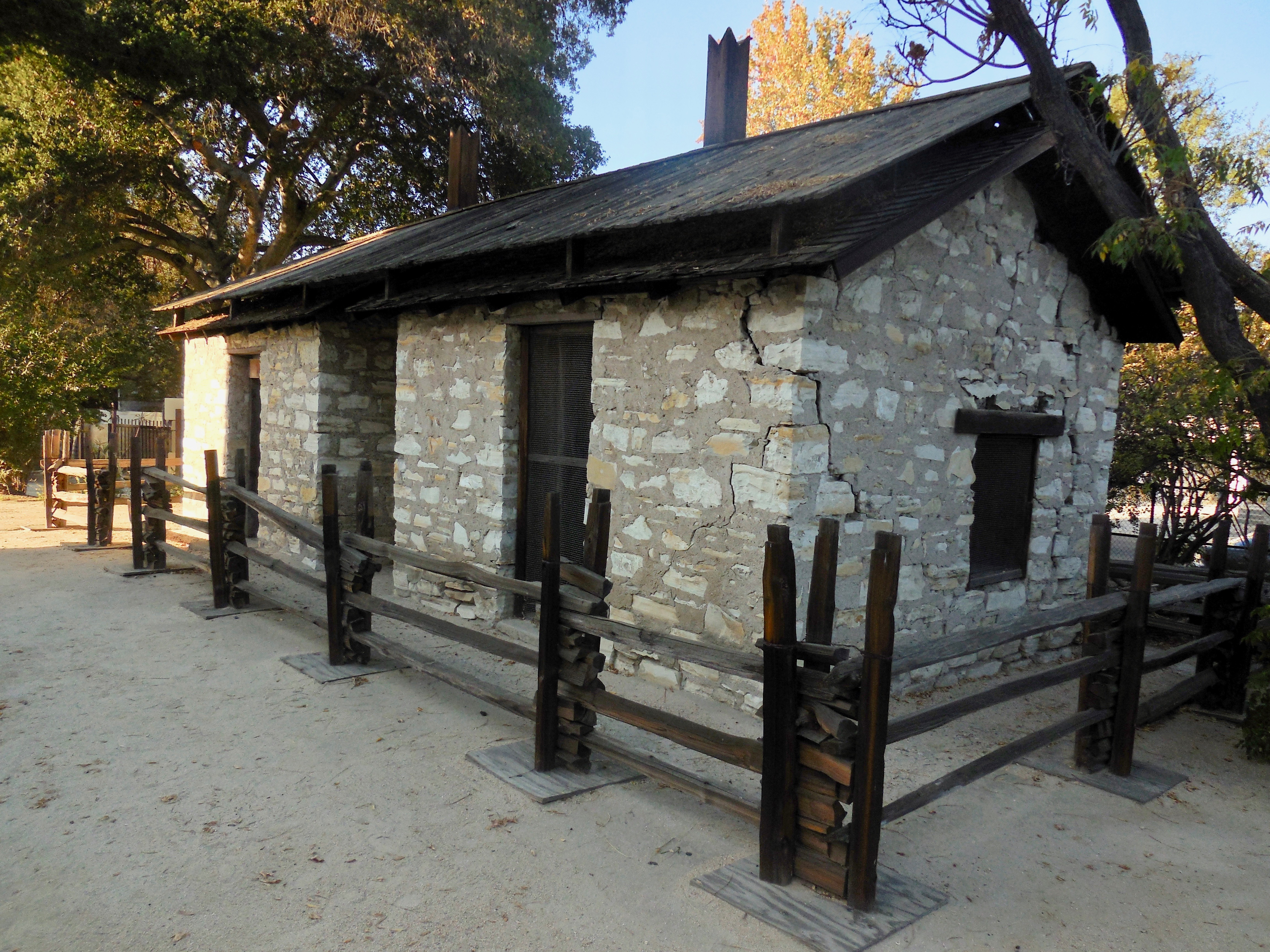
An outbuilding

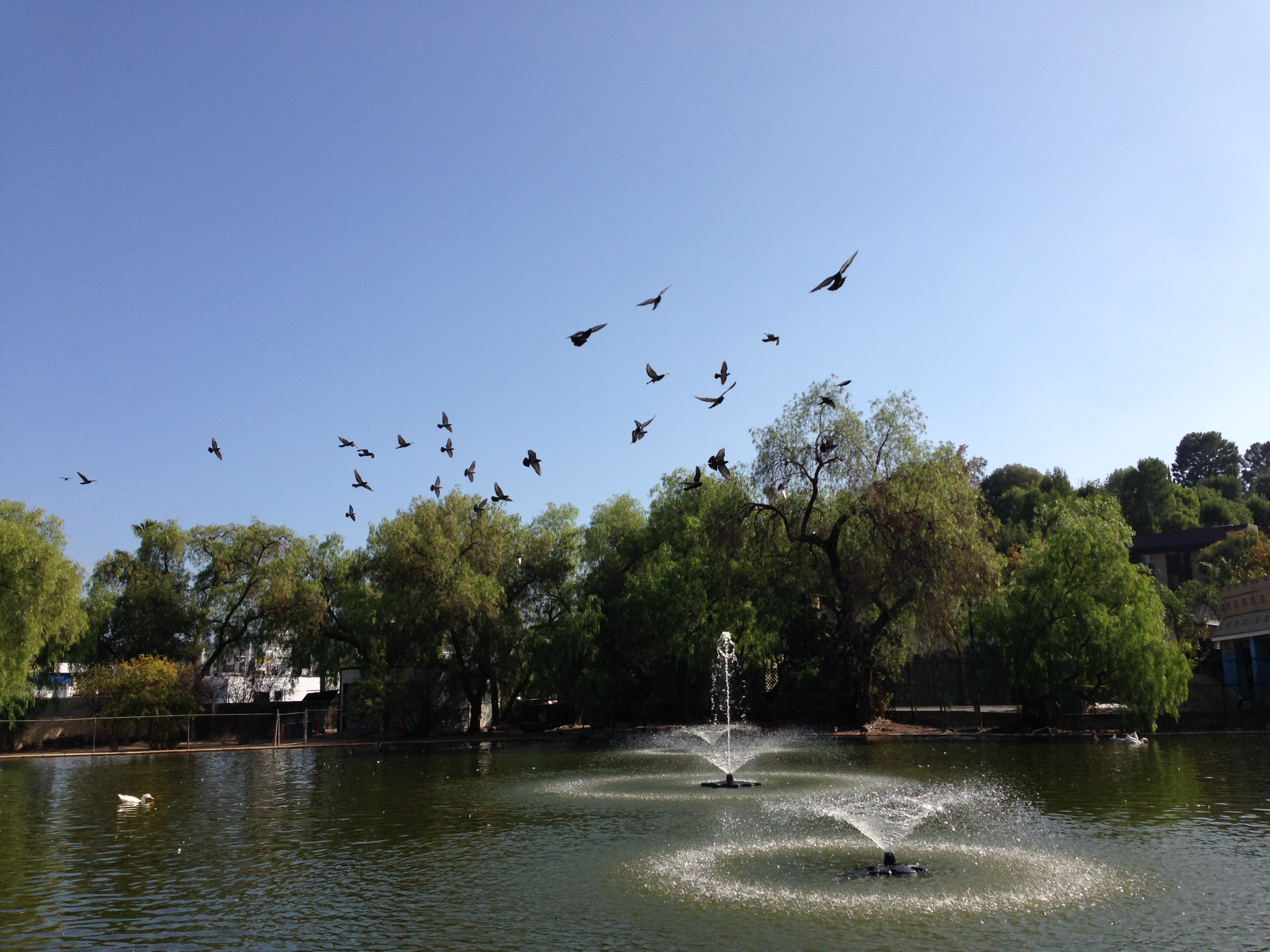
Fountain

== See also ==
- List of California state parks
- Ranchos of Los Angeles County
