= Arbaş (surname) =

Arbaş, sometimes spelled Arbaš, is a surname. Notable people with the surname include:

- Avni Arbaş (1919–2003), Turkish painter of Circassian descent
- Derya Arbaş (1968–2003), Turkish American actress
