= List of Los Angeles Historic-Cultural Monuments in the San Fernando Valley =

This is a list of Los Angeles Historic-Cultural Monuments in the San Fernando Valley, California. It includes Historic-Cultural Monuments in the San Fernando Valley as well as the adjacent Crescenta Valley. In total, there are more than 70 Historic-Cultural Monuments (HCM) in the San Fernando and Crescenta Valleys. A handful of additional historic sites in the valleys have been designated as California Historical Landmarks or listed on the National Register of Historic Places. The sites that are within City of Los Angeles borders are covered by two commissions of the Los Angeles Department of City Planning: the North Valley Area Planning Commission and the South Valley Area Planning Commission. They are designated by the City's Cultural Heritage Commission.

== Overview of the Valley's Historic-Cultural Monuments ==
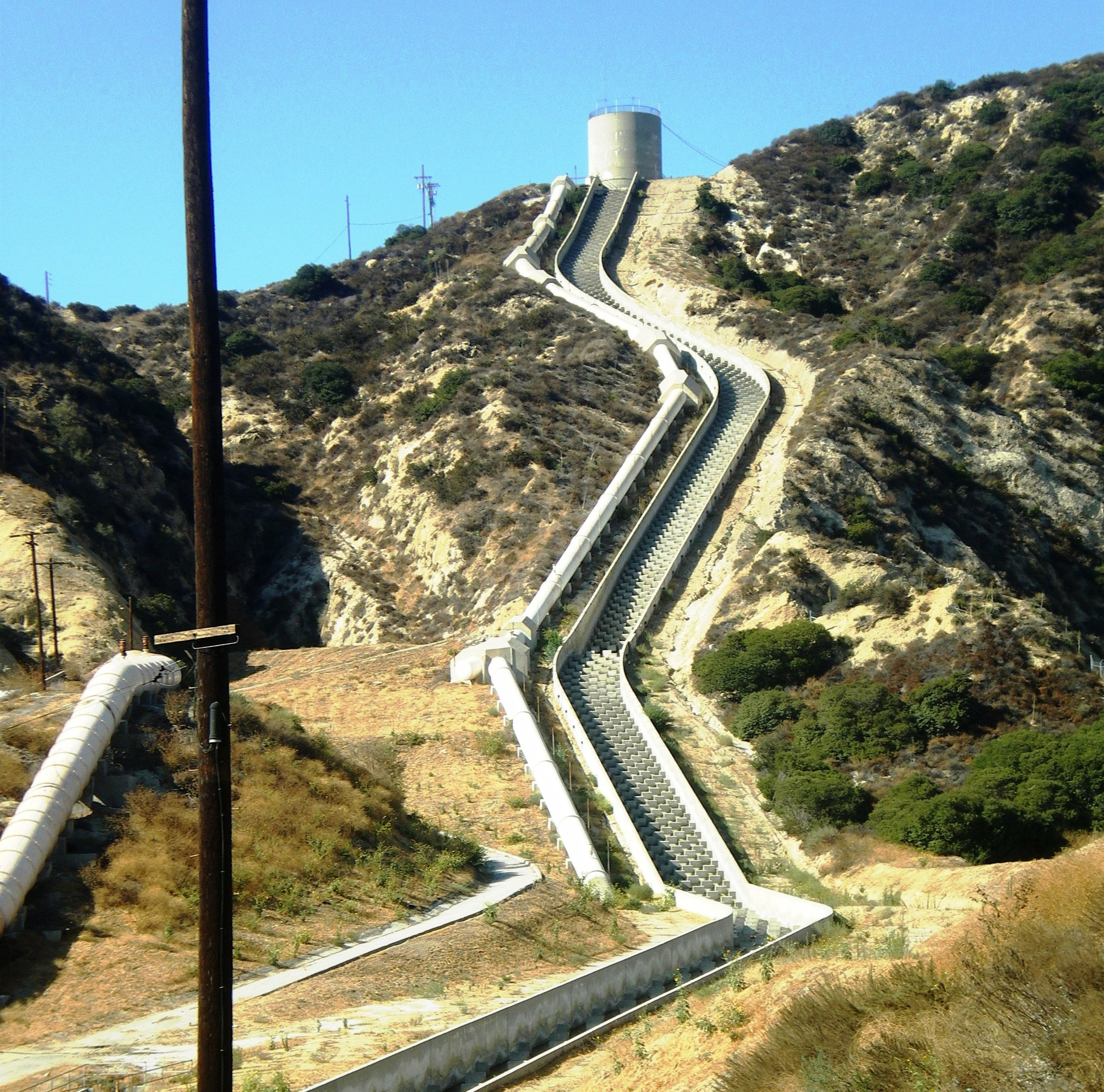
The Second Los Angeles Aqueduct Cascades near Sylmar, California

The Historic-Cultural Monuments in the San Fernando Valley are spread across the Valley from Chatsworth in the northwest to Studio City in the southeast, and from the City of Calabasas in the southwest to Tujunga and La Crescenta in the northeast.

When the Los Angeles Cultural Heritage Board was formed in 1962, its first-designated sites were HCM #1 (Leonis Adobe) and HCM #2 (Bolton Hall), both located in the San Fernando/Crescenta Valleys.

The oldest building in the Valley is the Convento Building at the Mission San Fernando Rey de España, which was built between 1808 and 1822. Other monuments directly related to the Mission San Fernando include the kiln in Chatsworth used to make bricks and tiles for the mission, the wells and settling basin in Sylmar used to supply water to the mission, and the Pioneer Cemetery where Mission Indians as well as Valley pioneers are buried.

In addition to the structures at the Mission, two adobe structures, Rómulo Pico Adobe built in 1834 and Leonis Adobe built in the 1840s, rank among the oldest in the Valley.

Eleven of the monuments located in the Valley have also been listed on the National Register of Historic Places. They are: Leonis Adobe, Bolton Hall, Rómulo Pico Adobe, the Convento Building at the Mission San Fernando, Campo de Cahuenga, Minnie Hill Palmer House, Los Encinos State Historic Park, Portal of the Folded Wings Shrine to Aviation, the Old Stage Coach Trail through the Santa Susana Mountains, and the North Hollywood and Van Nuys branch libraries.

Churches and other places of worship are well represented on the list, including the Chatsworth Community Church (1903), Faith Bible Church in Northridge (1917), the Saint Saviour's Chapel at Harvard-Westlake School in Studio City, and the David Familian Chapel of Temple Adat Ari El at the Valley's first Jewish synagogue in North Hollywood.

The role of trees in the development of the Valley is celebrated with monument listings for a 1,000-year-old oak tree in Encino (removed in 1996), 114 Himalayan Deodar trees along White Oak in Granada Hills, 76 mature olive trees along Lassen Street in Chatsworth, and 300 pepper trees lining in Canoga Avenue in Woodland Hills.

== Current and former Historic-Cultural Monuments ==
HCM #	Landmark name	Image	Date designated	Locality	Neighborhood	Description
1	Leonis Adobe	Leonis Adobe, 2008	August 6, 1962	23537 Calabasas Rd. 34°09′27″N 118°38′24″W	Calabasas, but within the limits of Woodland Hills, city of Los Angeles	Monterey-style adobe residence built in the 1840s and occupied by Miguel Leonis ("one of the most colorful, influential and prominent figures of early Los Angeles") starting in the 1870s; now operated as a museum
2 (2329)	Bolton Hall	2008 photo	August 6, 1962	10116 Commerce Ave. 34°15′10″N 118°17′17″W	Tujunga	Community hall of utopian community built from native stone and local hillside materials in 1913. Owned by City of Los Angeles—open to the public.
7 (CHL 362) (2394)	Romulo Pico Adobe	Rómulo Pico Adobe, 2008	September 21, 1962	10940 Sepulveda Blvd. 34°16′8″N 118°28′3″W	Mission Hills	Two-story adobe residence built in 1834 now operated by San Fernando Valley Historical Society; oldest residence in the San Fernando Valley
9	Shadow Ranch House		November 2, 1962	22633 Vanowen St. 34.194056°N 118.61902°W	West Hills	Two story ranch house built between 1869 and 1872, partly adobe and partly redwood
14	Chatsworth Community Church		January 28, 1963	22601 Lassen St. 34°15′8″N 118°37′14″W	Chatsworth	Located in Oakwood Memorial Park, the oldest public building in Chatsworth, built in 1903; originally at 10051 Topanga Canyon Blvd.
23 (2355)	San Fernando Rey Mission		August 8, 1963	15151 San Fernando Mission Blvd. 34°16′23″N 118°27′40″W	Mission Hills	Spanish mission built in the late 18th century; Convento Building (pictured) was rebuilt after the 1971 earthquake; 17th California Mission.
24	Encino Oak Tree		September 6, 1963	Louise Ave., 210 feet (64 m) south of Ventura Blvd.	Encino	Oak tree estimated to be 1,000 years old; tree damaged, removed and delisted 1/1/1997; stump pictured at left.
29	Campo de Cahuenga	Campo de Cahuenga	November 13, 1964	3919 Lankershim Blvd. 34°8′24″N 118°21′42″W	Studio City	Site of the signing of the Treaty of Cahuenga, January 13, 1847
31	Orcutt Ranch Horticulture Center		January 22, 1965	23555 Justice St. 34°13′01″N 118°38′21″W	Canoga Park	1920 Rancho Sombra del Roble Spanish Colonial Revival Style adobe residence and estate of early oil tycoon and discoverer of fossils at La Brea Tar Pits
32	Saint Saviour's Chapel Harvard School		February 5, 1965	3700 Coldwater Canyon Ave. 34°08′23″N 118°24′45″W	Studio City	Chapel patterned after the Chapel at Rugby School in England; pews face center aisle
41	114 Deodar Trees		August 3, 1966	White Oak Ave.34.26737°N 118.51966°W	Granada Hills	Cedrus deodara trees native to the Himalayas, planted in 1932; between San Fernando Mission and San Jose St.
49	76 Mature Olive Trees		May 10, 1967	Lassen St. 34°15′00″N 118°36′31″W	Chatsworth	Olive trees planted in late 19th Century lining both sides of Lassen St. between Topanga Canyon Blvd. and Farralone Ave.
50	Mission Wells and Settling Basin		May 10, 1967	Bleeker St. & Havana Ave. 34°17′31″N 118°27′14″W	Sylmar	Remains of wells built of mission tiles around 1800 by Tongva Indians from the Mission San Fernando Rey de España to provide water to the mission; taken over by the Department of Water and Power in 1919, the 6-acre (24,000 m^{2}) well site is the oldest existing source of water supply in the city, other than the Los Angeles River
63	McGroarty Home		February 4, 1970	7570 McGroarty Ter. 34°15′02″N 118°17′52″W	Tujunga	Fieldstone and stucco house was home to California poet laureate, and Congressman John S. McGroarty, 1933–1944. Owned by City of Los Angeles—open to public.
92	Old Stage Coach Trail Property		January 5, 1972	Chatsworth Park South; 34°15′40″N 118°37′40″W	Chatsworth	Old Santa Susana Stage Road over Santa Susana Pass dating to the 1860s linked the San Fernando Valley with Simi Valley and Ventura
93	Pepper Trees		January 5, 1972	Canoga Ave.	Woodland Hills	Approximately 300 California Pepper Trees (Schinus molle) planted for Girard development in the 1920s forming an arch over Canoga Ave. between Ventura Blvd. and Saltillo St.
132	Stoney Point Outcroppings		November 20, 1974	Chatsworth Park North; 34°15′45″N 118°37′04″W	Chatsworth	Picturesque rock outcroppings in northwest corner of Chatsworth
133	Minnie Hill Palmer House	Dunbar Hotel, 2008	November 20, 1974	Chatsworth Park South; 34°15′40″N 118°36′53″W	Chatsworth	Cottage built in 1913, typical of structures built by pioneering homesteaders in the San Fernando Valley
135	Canoga Mission Gallery		December 4, 1974	23130 Sherman Way; 34°11′20″N 118°37′51″W	West Hills	Mission Revival Style stables built in 1936 by Francis Lederer, converted into a community arts center 1970s
141	Chatsworth Reservoir Kiln Site		April 2, 1975	Southeast of intersection of Woolsey Canyon Rd. and Valley Circle Blvd. 34°14′08″N 118°38′26″W	West Hills	La Calera; Site of kiln used to make bricks and tiles for the San Fernando Mission; fenced off and not accessible to public
152	Faith Bible Church		April 17, 1976	18531 Gresham St. 34°13′51″N 118°32′13″W	Northridge	First church built in Northridge; Originally known as the Norwegian Lutheran Church; completed in 1917 in Gothic style
172	Stonehurst Recreation Center Building		March 9, 1977	9901 Dronfield St. 34.2490°N 118.3749°W	Sun Valley	Building constructed out of native stone c. 1930 by an Indian stonemason
184	Tower of Wooden Pallets		April 19, 1978	15357 Magnolia Blvd. 34°14′58″N 118°28′04″W	Sherman Oaks	Tower of 2,000 wooden pallets built in 1951 covering the grave of a child buried in 1869 (site of)
199	David Familian Chapel of Temple Adat Ari El		September 20, 1978	5540 Laurel Canyon Blvd. 34°10′17″N 118°23′47″W	North Hollywood	Chapel in the first synagogue building in the San Fernando Valley, dedicated in 1949 (site of)
201	Van Nuys Woman's Club Building		October 18, 1978	14836 Sylvan St. 34°11′03″N 118°27′23″W	Van Nuys	Craftsman-style building completed in 1917, housing social club
202	Valley Municipal Building (Van Nuys City Hall)		October 18, 1978	14410 Sylvan St. 34°11′03″N 118°26′50″W	Van Nuys	Art Deco style municipal building constructed in 1932; one of the Valley's most recognized landmarks
203	Baird House (Volunteer League Community Center)		October 18, 1978	14603 Hamlin St. 34°11′24″N 118°27′04″W	Van Nuys	Bungalow-style residence built in 1921; later converted to use by the Volunteer League of the San Fernando Valley
204	Lederer Residence and Immediate Environments		November 15, 1978	23134 Sherman Way; 34°12′02″N 118°37′54″W	West Hills	Mission Revival Style home built starting in 1934 with aged materials by Francis Lederer
228	Laurelwood Apartments		April 22, 1980	11833-11847 Laurelwood Dr. 34°08′29″N 118°23′25″W	Studio City	Apartment building designed by noted architect, Rudolph Schindler, built in 1948
232	Department of Water and Power Building		July 14, 1980	5106-5108 Lankershim Blvd. 34.163266°N 118.373374°W	North Hollywood	Streamline Moderne structure designed by S. Charles Lee, built in 1939
290	La Reina Theater		February 15, 1985	14626 Ventura Blvd. 34°09′05″N 118°27′07″W	Sherman Oaks	Streamline Moderne movie theater designed by S. Charles Lee, built in 1938; converted to retail shops in 1987
293	The Magnolia		June 18, 1985	13242 Magnolia Blvd. 34°09′51″N 118°25′18″W	Sherman Oaks	Spanish Colonial Revival residence built in the late 1920s
302 (2359)	Amelia Earhart Branch (North Hollywood Branch Library)		June 27, 1986	5211 N. Tujunga Ave. 34°09′55″N 118°22′45″W	North Hollywood	Spanish Colonial Revival style branch library built in 1929, originally dedicated to poet Sidney Lanier, later dedicated to aviator Earhart, a North Hollywood resident.
405	Pacific Electric Picover Railway Station		January 11, 1989	16710 Sherman Way	Van Nuys	Pacific Electric Railway station, built partly in 1917 and partly in 1932; destroyed by fire in 1990
484	Oakridge and Grounds		March 23, 1990	18650 Devonshire St. 34°15′24″N 118°32′23″W	Northridge	English Manor style home built in 1937 for Barbara Stanwyck; later occupied by Jack Oakie; now owned by City of Los Angeles (2010).
488	Canoga Park (originally Owensmouth) Southern Pacific Railroad Station		May 30, 1990	21355 Sherman Way	Canoga Park	Spanish Revival railroad station built in 1912; destroyed by fire in 1993
573	El Portal Theater		February 9, 1993	5265-5271 Lankershim Blvd. 34°10′01″N 118°22′33″W	North Hollywood	Spanish Renaissance Revival theater, office and retail building completed in 1926
586 (CHL 753)	San Fernando Pioneer Memorial Cemetery		November 30, 1993	14400 Foothill Blvd. 34°19′15″N 118°26′53″W	Sylmar	Second oldest cemetery in the San Fernando Valley, holds remains of early pioneers, Civil War veterans and Mission Indians
622	Taft House and Landscaping		April 16, 1996	16745 San Fernando Mission Blvd. 34°16′20″N 118°29′49″W	Granada Hills	Late 19th Century Victorian house; features wood siding and trim, shingled gambrel roof, double hung windows, dormers and a wraparound porch supported by turned wood columns; home for matriarch of the influential Taft family.
629	Adams Residence		October 4, 1996	7400 Tampa Ave. 34°12′17″N 118°33′11″W	Reseda	Small house designed by Lloyd Wright, also known as "Mat House"
638	"El Paradiso"		March 18, 1997	11468 Dona Cecilia Dr. 34°07′39″N 118°23′04″W	Studio City	Modern, space-age, 4,500-square-foot (420 m^{2}) house designed by Raphael Soriano, built in 1964, with 28 aluminum sliding doors
644	Stone House		December 19, 1987	8642 Sunland Blvd. 34.2272°N 118.3658°W	Sun Valley	American Craftsman style house built in 1925, with rock walls, gabled roofs, arched window openings, square tower, and a stone chimney
645	Harvester Farms		December 19, 1997	22049 Devonshire St. 34°15′27″N 118°36′28″W	Chatsworth	Site was the headquarters of the Palomino Horse Association of America; Harvester was the father of the horse who played Mister Ed.
683	Chase Knolls Garden Apartments		July 11, 2000	13401 W. Riverside Dr. 34°09′27″N 118°25′30″W	Sherman Oaks	Dairy farm converted to residential development in the late 1940s; 260 bungalows and apartment homes
700	Canoga Park Branch Library		September 20, 2000	7260 N. Owensmouth Ave. 34°12′09″N 118°36′05″W	Canoga Park	Branch library built in 1959, designed by Bowerman & Hobson
718	Ward House		July 30, 2002	14501 Mulholland Dr. 34°07′56″N 118°26′55″W	Sherman Oaks	
740	The Serulnic House		January 13, 2006	3947 Markridge Rd. 34°15′03″N 118°15′59″W	La Crescenta	Hillside house designed by Richard Neutra for Neutra's secretary and her husband, a musician with the Los Angeles Philharmonic; built in 1952
742	First Los Angeles Aqueduct Cascades		February 4, 2003	Near intersection of Foothill Blvd. and Balboa Blvd.	Sylmar	Terminus of the Los Angeles-Owens River Aqueduct, which brings water 338 miles (544 km) from the eastern slopes of the Sierra Nevada to Los Angeles; begun in 1905 and completed in 1913; also California Historic Landmark #653
750	The Munch Box		June 3, 2003	21532 W. Devonshire St. 34°15′25″N 118°35′59″W	Chatsworth	1950s hamburger stand with red and yellow coloring and a jet age overhang
759	Gerst Residence		July 29, 2003	3437 Adina Dr. 34°07′43″N 118°21′13″W	Studio City	House built in 1952
763	Studio Theatre at the Denis Building		August 13, 2003	3433 Cahuenga Blvd. W. 34°07′55″N 118°21′11″W	Studio City	Formerly the creative center for Ruth St. Denis, considered the "mother" of American modern dance whose most acclaimed student was Martha Graham; still in use for dance performances
782	El Encanto		June 15, 2004	17360 Chase St. 34°13′21″N 118°30′43″W	Northridge	Barn built in 1942 and converted into a residence by architect Henry Withey in 1947 for General Harris Malasky, who renamed it Black Hawk Ranch
793	La Casa Sueno De Lewis Stone Ranch		May 4, 2005	5700 N Rhodes Ave. 34°10′27″N 118°24′11″W	Valley Village	Spanish Colonial Revival structure built in 1930 with stucco cladding, low pitched tile roof, and decorative glazed tile and ironwork. Example of "Hollywood movie star" commissioned residential architecture.
828	Harry J. Wolff House		November 9, 2005	4000 N. Sunnyslope Ave. 34°08′32″N 118°25′34″W	Sherman Oaks	House designed in 1938 by Rudolph Schindler
830	Blarney Castle		January 13, 2006	10217 N. Tujunga Canyon Blvd. 34°15′07″N 118°17′28″W	Tujunga	Well-known Sunland-Tujunga home built in 1919, modeled after an Irish castle
838	Oak Glen Ranch		March 17, 2006	9811 N. Hillhaven Ave. 34°14′50″N 118°17′26″W	Tujunga	Built in 1908 by Flora Morgan, one of the first farmhouses in the Tujunga area
841	Weatherwolde Castle		May 3, 2006	10629-10633 N. Commerce Ave. 34°15′43″N 118°17′18″W	Tujunga	Exotic-style house built in 1928, designed to resemble a French Normandy 16th-century castle
848	Eichler Homes-Foster Residence		August 16, 2006	17145 West Nanette St. 34°18′06″N 118°30′21″W	Granada Hills	Mid-20th Century post-and-beam house designed by A. Quincy Jones, FAIA, and Frederick Emmons, AIA. for Eichler Homes; epitomizes modernist architecture and indoor-outdoor living with extensive glass walls opening to a large rear yard
860	Kallis House		February 6, 2007	3580 N. Multiview Dr. 34°07′52″N 118°21′45″W	Studio City	House designed by Rudolph Schindler, built in 1946; nestled into a hillside with a dramatic view overlooking of the Valley
869	Bakman House		May 16, 2007	10623 Riverside Dr. 34°09′09″N 118°21′44″W	Toluca Lake	Spanish Colonial Revival house built in 1929 for Dan Bakman; one of the original homes in Toluca Lake
883	Weddington House		August 15, 2007	11025 W. Weddington St. 34°10′02″N 118°22′16″W	North Hollywood	First house built in the southeast San Fernando Valley
910	Riverside-Zoo Drive Bridge, No. 53C1298		January 30, 2008	Between Victory Blvd. and Zoo Dr. 34.1562°N 118.2943°W	Griffith Park	Built in 1938, this reinforced concrete bridge exhibits character-defining features of Art Deco-Streamline Moderne bridge design.
911 (2509)	Van Nuys Branch Library		February 13, 2008	14555 Sylvan St. 34°11′5″N 118°26′59″W	Van Nuys	Old branch library building (1927)--fine example of Spanish colonial style—no longer used as a library
917	Roland E. Hill House		April 23, 2008	3268 N. Bennett Dr; 34.125977°N 118.348282°W	Studio City	French Eclectic storybook style, designed by Roland E. Hill, 1926.
918	Lydecker Hilltop House		May 14, 2008	3820 Buena Park Dr. 34.139071°N 118.389112°W	Studio City	Streamline Moderne house built in 1939 for Howard "Babe" Lydecker known as one of Hollywood's early geniuses of special effects
932	Clarence G. Badger Residence		July 29, 2008	7128 Woodrow Wilson Dr. 34.124178°N 118.348246°W	Studio City	Spanish Colonial Revival house built in 1916 for early motion picture director Clarence Badger
933	Kramer House		September 25, 2008	12556 N. Middlecoff Pl.	Granada Hills	Mid-Century Modern Ranch, 1966.
941	Stonehurst House		March 4, 2009	10021 N. Stonehurst Ave. 34°15′6.63″N 118°22′20.43″W	Sun Valley	Residence built 1924 by Daniel Lawrence Montelongo, a stonemason of Native American descent. Craftsman style with Spanish Colonial Revival elements.
946	Verdugo Hills of Peace Pioneer Cemetery		March 4, 2009	7000 Parsons Trail; 34°15′41.88″N 118°17′0.47″W	Tujunga	Established by Marshall Valentine Hartranft in 1922.
952	Kaye Residence		April 22, 2009	4754 Vanalden Ave. 34°9′23.21″N 118°33′9″W	Tarzana	Designed by Gregory Ain, built 1963.
974	Van Dekker House		February 26, 2010	19950 W. Collier St.	Woodland Hills	Modern 1940 house designed by Rudolph Schindler.
975	Sepulveda Unitarian Universalist Society Sanctuary ("The Onion")		February 26, 2010	9550 N. Haskell Avenue34°14′39.22″N 118°28′30.41″W	North Hills	"Built in 1964... Modern style church sanctuary... hosted several political events opposing the Vietnam War... designed by student of Richard Neutra."
976	Corbin Palms House		February 26, 2010	6118 Jumilla Ave.34°10′54.93″N 118°33′49.21″W	Woodland Hills	"Built in 1955... Modern Ranch style single-family residence designed by... Palmer & Krisel, who designed several Mid-Century Modern neighborhoods."
977	Idle Hour Café		February 26, 2010	4824 Vineland Ave.34°9′30.27″N 118°22′12.75″W	North Hollywood	"Constructed in 1941... appears to be the last barrel-shaped building in Los Angeles from the early 20th century period of Programmatic design."
978	Lankershim Reading Room		February 26, 2010	10940 Sepulveda Blvd.34°16′8″N 118°28′3″W	Mission Hills	"One-story, octagonal-shaped [1904] structure... last remaining building from the Lankershim Ranch." Relocated to the park at the Rómulo Pico Adobe (LAHCM #7) in 2001.
981	Margaret and Harry Hay House			3132 N. Oakcrest Dr. 34°7′31.8″N 118°20′47.85″W		International Style by Gregory Ain, 1939, for Harry Hay, founder of the Mattachine Society.
992	T.R. Craig Residence “Peppergate Ranch”		March 9, 2011	8431 Pinelake Drive	West Hills	"One-story single-family residence, designed by Paul R. Williams in the Ranch Style, built in 1939.
1078	North Hollywood Masonic Temple		January 27, 2015	5122 Tujunga Avenue	North Hollywood	Exterior only. Designed by Robert Stacy-Judd. "A grandly scaled example of a Masonic lodge."

== Non-HCM historic sites recognized by state and nation ==
Code	Landmark name	Image	Date designated	Locality	Neighborhood	Description
(CHL 689)	Los Encinos State Historic Park			16756 Moorpark St. 34°09′37″N 118°29′54″W	Encino	Rancho El Encino: "Franciscan padres used Encino as their headquarters while exploring the valley before establishing Mission San Fernando in 1797..."
(2702)	Portal of the Folded Wings Shrine to Aviation & Museum			10621 Victory Blvd. 34°11′25″N 118°21′13″W	North Hollywood	Memorial to pioneers of aviation located on grounds of Valhalla Memorial Park Cemetery.
(CHL 150)	Brand Park (Memory Garden)			15174 San Fernando Mission Blvd. 34°16′21″N 118°27′43″W	Mission Hills	Former Mission gardens across from Mission San Fernando Rey, now operated as a public park
(2179)	Toluca Southern Pacific Depot			11275 Chandler Blvd & 5351 Lankershim Blvd	North Hollywood	Former Southern Pacific and Pacific Electric station at the site of the current Red/Orange Line hub.
(2412)	Rancho Del Norte			18904 Nordhoff St. & 9051 Wilbur Ave.	Northridge	
(2414)	New Mission Theatre			9015 Wilbur Ave.	Northridge	Mission-style theater built in 1987 by Elisabeth Waldo for use by the Multi-Cultural Music and Art Foundation of Northridge
(2451)	Phil's Diner			Formerly 11138 Chandler Blvd. Now 5230 Lankershim Blvd. 34°9′56.57″N 118°22′29.72″W	North Hollywood	Diner built in the 1920s; moved and re-opened in 2008 at the corner of Lankershim and Weddington –- across from the El Portal Theater
(2517)	Van Nuys Post Office Building			14530 Sylvan St. 34°11′04″N 118°27′00″W	Van Nuys	Spanish Colonial style structure built in 1935; formerly the Van Nuys Post Office
(CHL 716)	Griffith Ranch			Sylmar and San Fernando	Foothill Blvd. and Vaughn St.	Ranch purchased by D.W. Griffith in 1912 in the northeast valley; The Birth of a Nation and many westerns were filmed on the ranch; a historic marker is located at Foothill Blvd. and Vaughn St.

== See also ==
- Bibliography of Los Angeles
- Outline of the history of Los Angeles
- Bibliography of California history

=== Lists of L.A. Historic-Cultural Monuments ===
- Historic-Cultural Monuments in Downtown Los Angeles
- Historic-Cultural Monuments on the East and Northeast Sides
- Historic-Cultural Monuments in the Harbor area
- Historic-Cultural Monuments in Hollywood
- Historic-Cultural Monuments in Silver Lake, Angelino Heights, and Echo Park
- Historic-Cultural Monuments in South Los Angeles
- Historic-Cultural Monuments on the Westside
- Historic-Cultural Monuments in the Wilshire and Westlake areas

=== Other ===
- City of Los Angeles' Historic Preservation Overlay Zones
- National Register of Historic Places listings in Los Angeles
- National Register of Historic Places listings in Los Angeles County
- List of California Historical Landmarks
