= Chatsworth Community Church =

Los Angeles Historic-Cultural Monument in California, U.S.

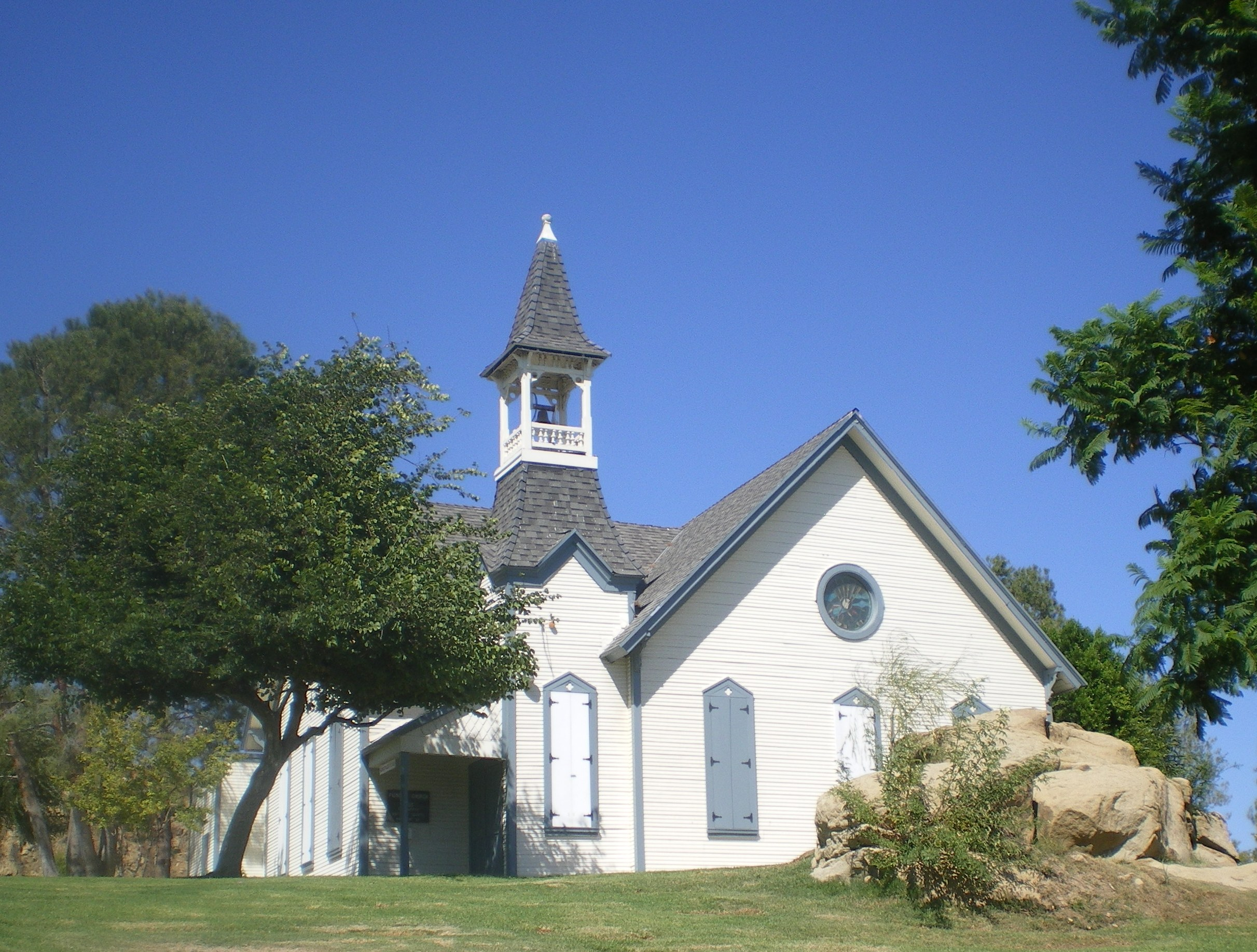
- Chatsworth Community Church, September 2008

- Location within the Los Angeles metropolitan area
- 34.25474°N 118.62053°W
- Location: 22601 Lassen Street; Chatsworth, Los Angeles, California; United States

History
- Built: 1903

Site notes
- Governing body: private

Los Angeles Historic-Cultural Monument
- Designated: November 2, 1962
- Reference no.: 14

Chatsworth Community Church is a Los Angeles Historic-Cultural Monument in the Chatsworth section of Los Angeles, California.

== History ==
The church was built in 1903 using volunteer labor. It was also used as the community's high school from 1906–1908. It was a center of community life in the early days of Chatsworth, serving as a haven from floods and fires.

In 1958, its name was changed to the Chatsworth First Methodist Church.

After the church was closed in 1963, it was left vacant and became the victim of vandalism. The church was "the last remaining community building" of old Chatsworth, and became threatened by development.

In January 1963, it became only the fourteenth site to be designated as a Los Angeles Historic-Cultural Monument. In order to save it from demolition, the Chatsworth Historical Society raised $19,725 to move the church in 1965 from its original location at 10051 Topanga Canyon Boulevard to its present site on the grounds of Oakwood Memorial Park.

== Today ==
The building was saved, moved, and restored through the efforts of the Chatsworth Historical Society. The Oakwood Memorial Park Association allowed the building to be moved to the northwest corner of the cemetery and since November 15, 1981, the building has been occupied by the congregation of St. Mary the Virgin Anglican-Rite Catholic Church. On February 22, 1984, the Don Jose de Ortega Chapter of the Daughters of the American Revolution presented a bronze plaque to the church marking the building's place in California history. They also presented an American Flag and a California Flag which rest on standards in the nave.

In 1982, The Right Reverend James Orin Mote, Bishop of the Los Angeles Diocese, consecrated the building for the Anglican-Rite Catholic Church.

== See also ==
- List of Los Angeles Historic-Cultural Monuments in the San Fernando Valley
