= San Fernando Pioneer Memorial Cemetery =

Historic cemetery in Los Angeles, US

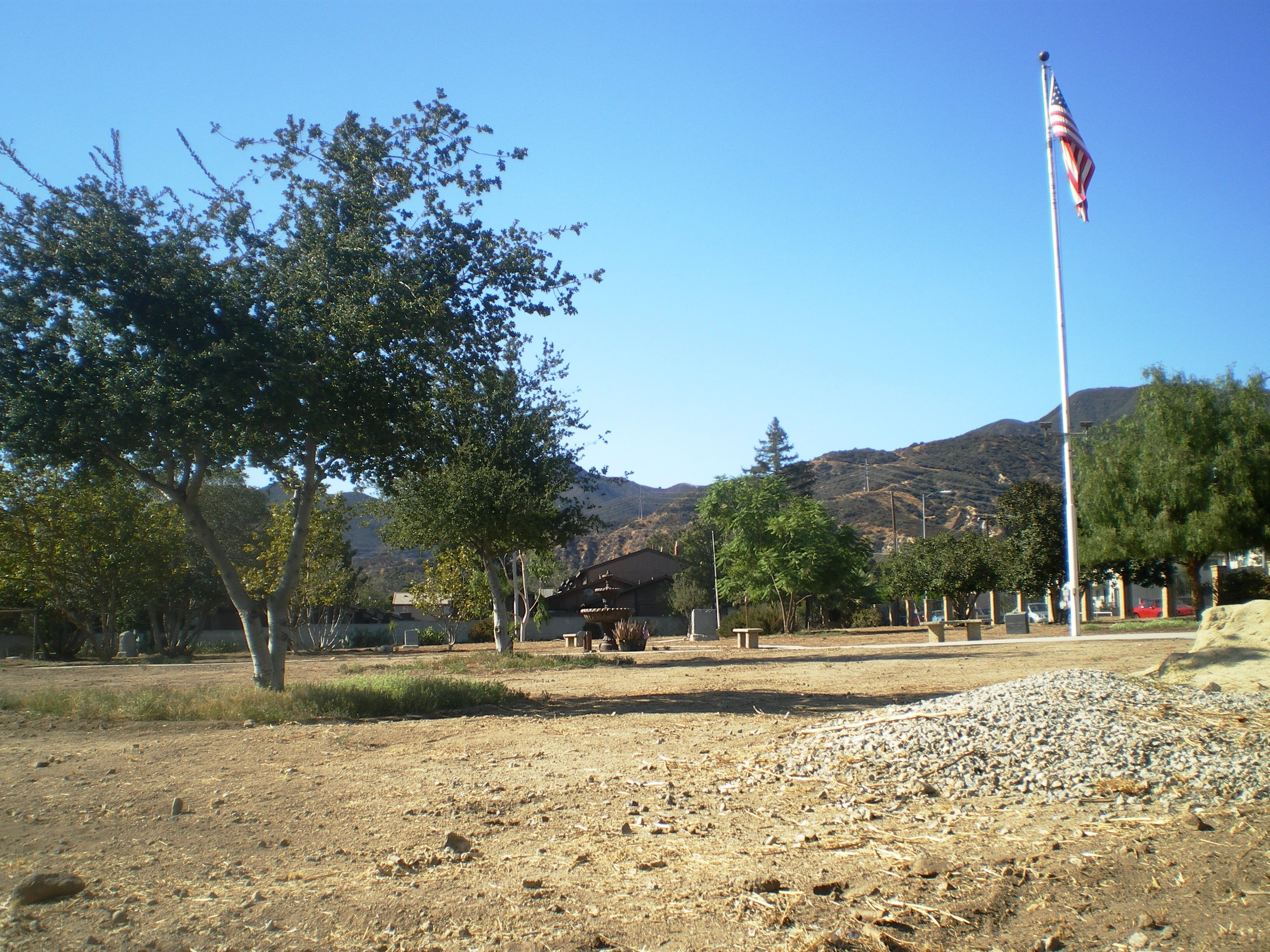
- San Fernando Pioneer Memorial Cemetery, September 2008

- Location within the Los Angeles metropolitan area
- 34°19′15″N 118°26′56″W
- Location: 14400 Foothill Boulevard, Sylmar, Los Angeles, California

Site notes
- Governing body: City of Los Angeles Dept. of Recreation & Parks

California Historical Landmark
- Reference no.: 753

Los Angeles Historic-Cultural Monument
- Designated: November 30, 1993
- Reference no.: 586

San Fernando Pioneer Memorial Cemetery, earlier known as Morningside Cemetery, is a cemetery in the Sylmar district of Los Angeles, California, United States. Located on a 3.8-acre (15,000 m^{2}) site at the corner of Foothill Boulevard and Bledsoe Street, the Pioneer Cemetery was originally a 10-acre (400,000 m^{2}) site.

== History ==
The cemetery was established in 1874 when Senator Charles Maclay created the Township of San Fernando. The last burial was most likely in 1939. It was known at the time as the San Fernando Cemetery and also as the Morningside Cemetery, and is the oldest non-denominational cemetery in the San Fernando Valley, the area's oldest cemetery being the San Fernando Mission Cemetery, which began operating in approximately 1800.

Approximately 700 residents were buried there between 1892 and 1939. Due to heavy vandalism, there were only 13 tombstones remaining. After the cemetery was determined to be legally abandoned in 1959, it was acquired by the Native Daughters of the Golden West San Fernando Mission Chapter #280, renamed, and maintained as a pioneer memorial park. Edith Reber, a longtime resident of Sylmar and an active member of the Chamber, ran a volunteer effort to maintain the grounds with the help of local volunteer groups for many years. In 1979, new condominiums were built on the adjacent property. The building permit required the builder to construct a wrought-iron fence surrounding the cemetery with locked gates to help preserve the historic property. In 2002, the Native Daughters gave the cemetery to the San Fernando Valley Historical Society. The Society has made many improvements to the property, including installing a memorial brick entrance, and occasionally opening the cemetery to the public. The Society also commissioned a ground-penetrating radar survey in 2010 that located 214 gravesites. Through volunteer research, nearly 700 death certificates citing Morningside Cemetery have been located. These death certificates reveal the community's earliest population, mortality, and disease demographics.

The cemetery was listed as a Los Angeles Historic-Cultural Monument in 1993. As "San Fernando Cemetery", it is a California Historical Landmark.

It is listed as a filming location for the 1959 Ed Wood movie “Plan 9 From Outer Space.”

== See also ==
- List of Los Angeles Historic-Cultural Monuments in the San Fernando Valley
