= Faith Bible Church, Northridge, California =

Faith Bible Church
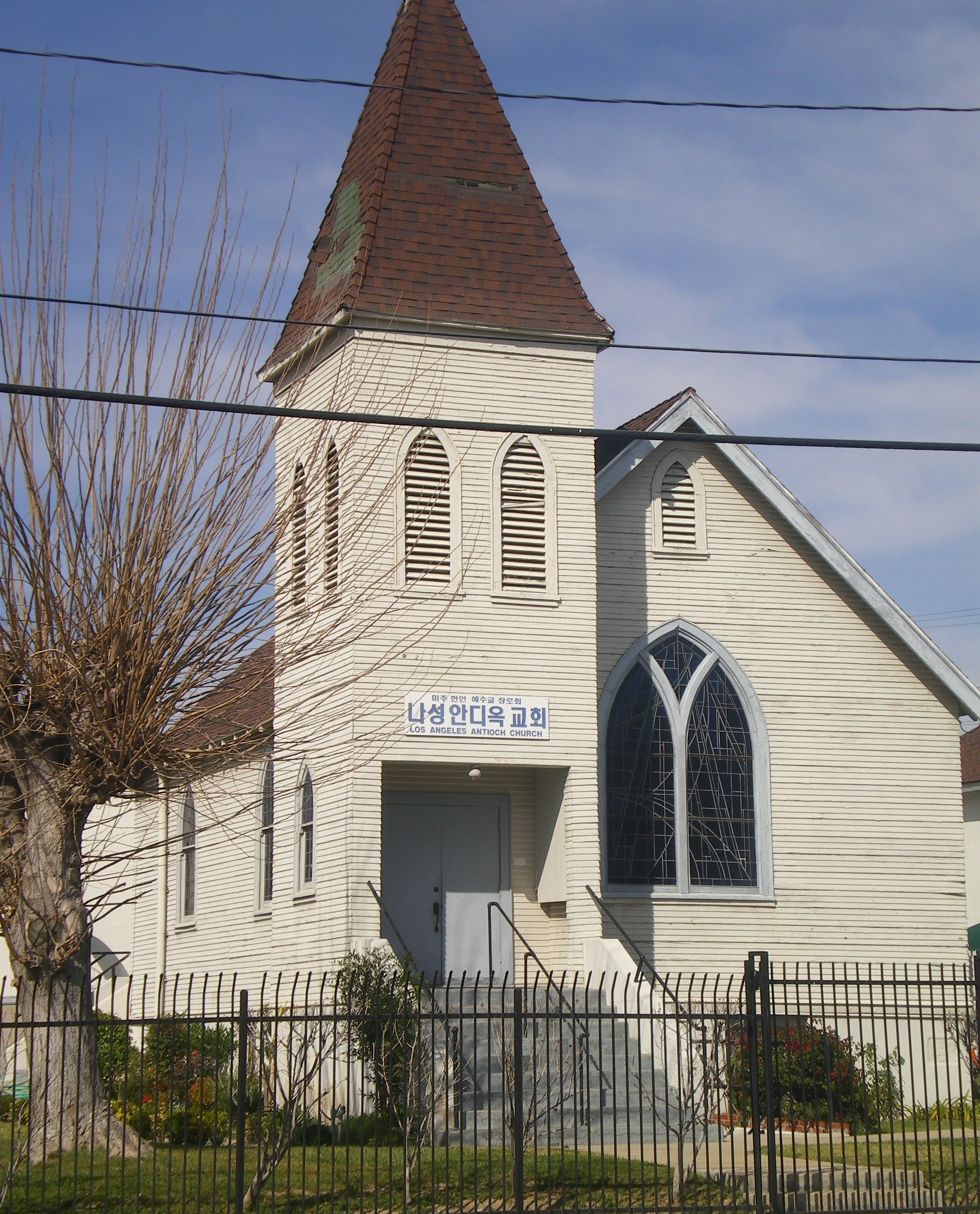
- Faith Bible Church, March 2008

- Location within the Los Angeles metropolitan area
- 34°6′6″N 118°20′27″W
- Location: 18531 Gresham St., Northridge, Los Angeles, California

History
- Built: 1917

Site notes
- Architectural style: Carpenter Gothic
- Governing body: Private

Los Angeles Historic-Cultural Monument
- Designated: April 17, 1976
- Reference no.: 152

Faith Bible Church, built in 1917, was the first church built in Northridge, located in the San Fernando Valley of Los Angeles, California. The church building was declared a City of Los Angeles Historic-Cultural Monument in 1975 by the Los Angeles Cultural Historical Board.

== History ==
The church is in the Carpenter Gothic Victorian style. It was built nine years after the Southern Pacific Railroad first laid tracks through Northridge, which was then known as Zelzah station, in 1908. When it was built, the church was originally known as the Norwegian Lutheran Church, as the six families that formed the congregation were of Norwegian descent.

Built of wood in the basilican style, with the steeple at the entrance, the church's early Gothic style is differentiated from the High Victorian Gothic by the thinness of moldings and its generally monochromatic appearance. One writer observed that, "with its steep stairs and narrow girth, it looks like a church you'd find sitting all alone on the Kansas plains."

== Present ==
The original church building still stands at 18531 Gresham Street in Northridge. For many years, it was known as the Faith Bible Church.

More recently, the church has been acquired and operated as a Korean congregation known as either the Northridge Free Methodist Church, or the Los Angeles Antioch Church. The sign on the church in March 2008 (in photograph to the right) identified it as the Los Angeles Antioch Church.

== Gallery ==
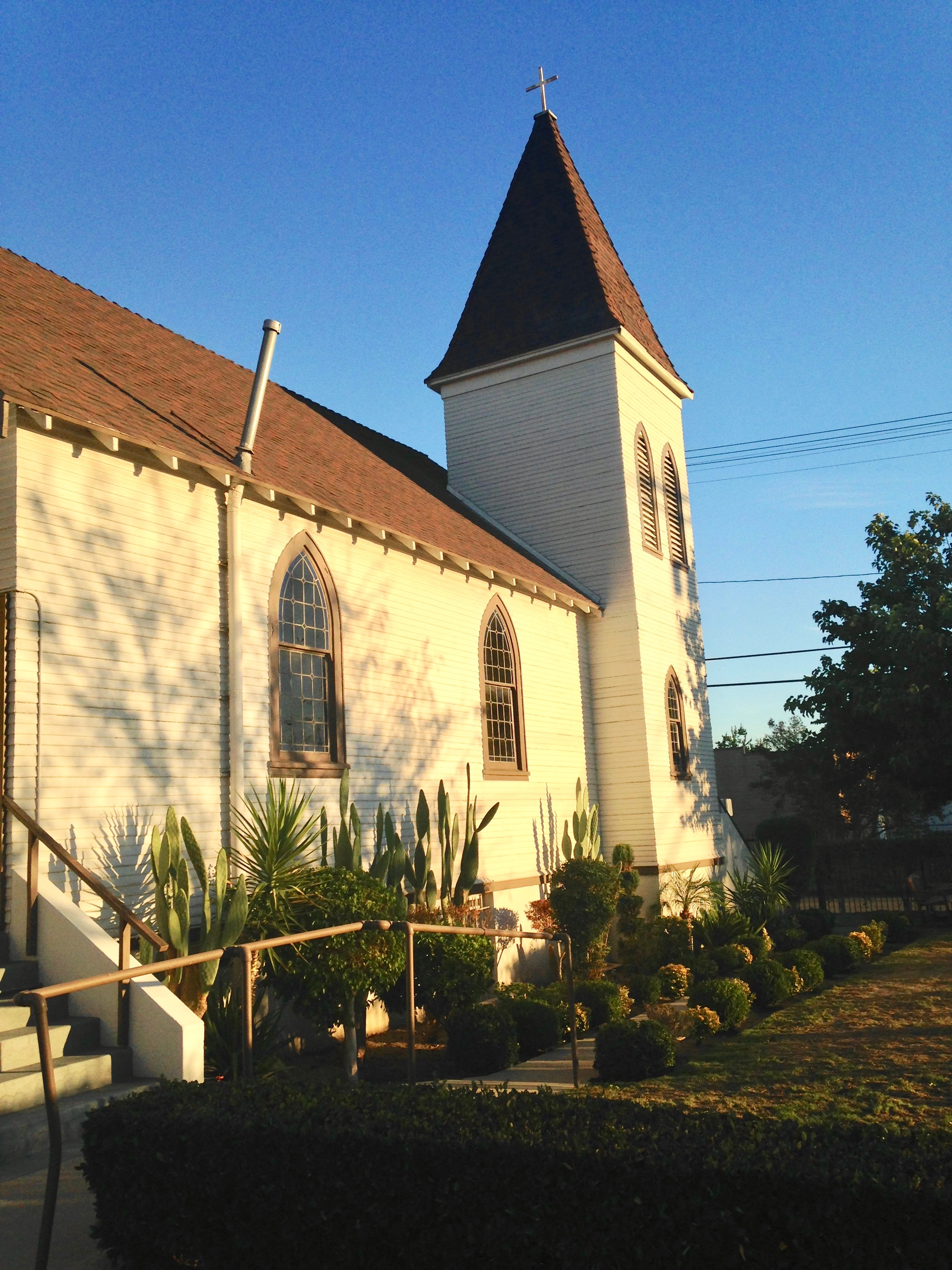

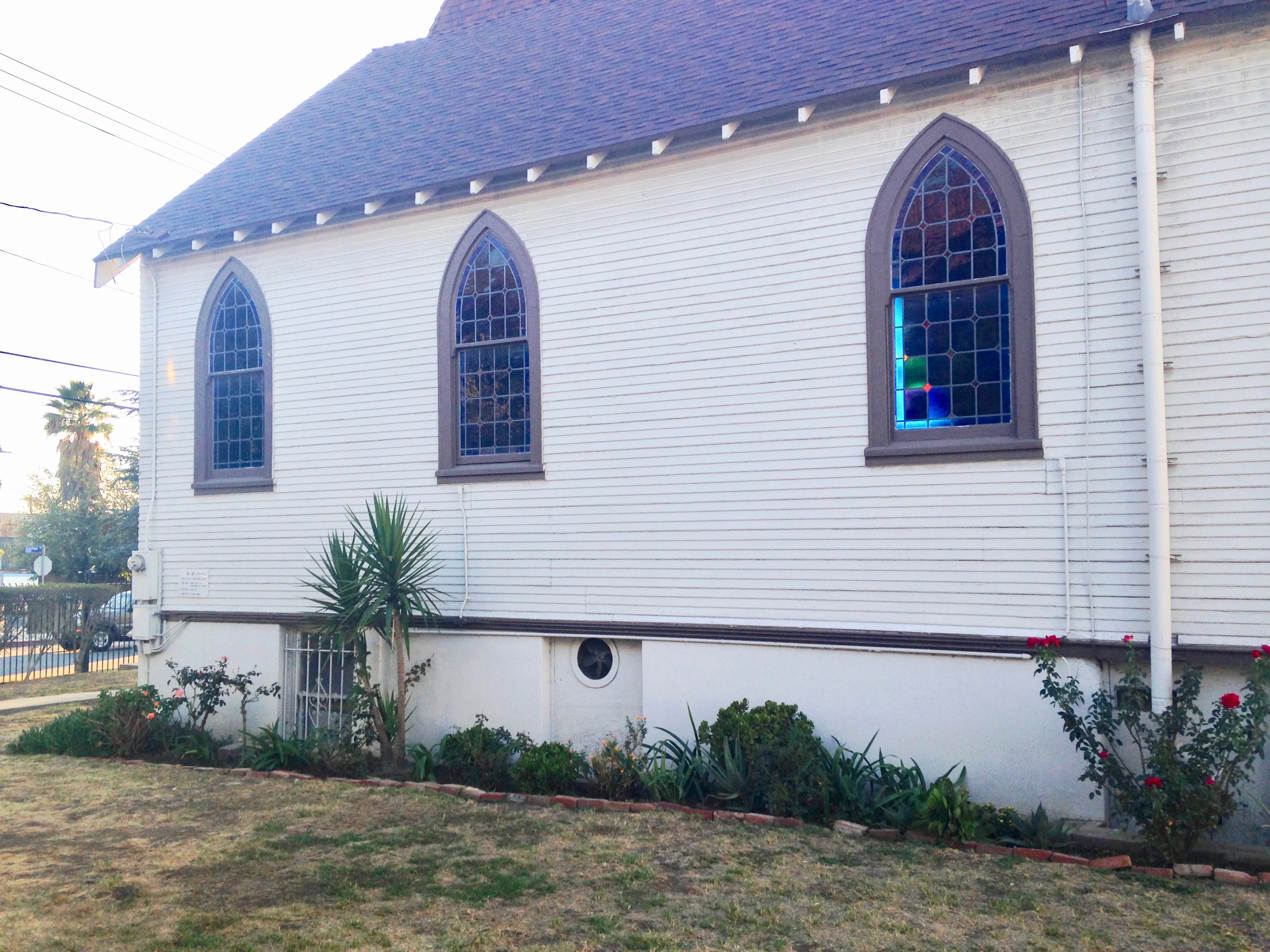

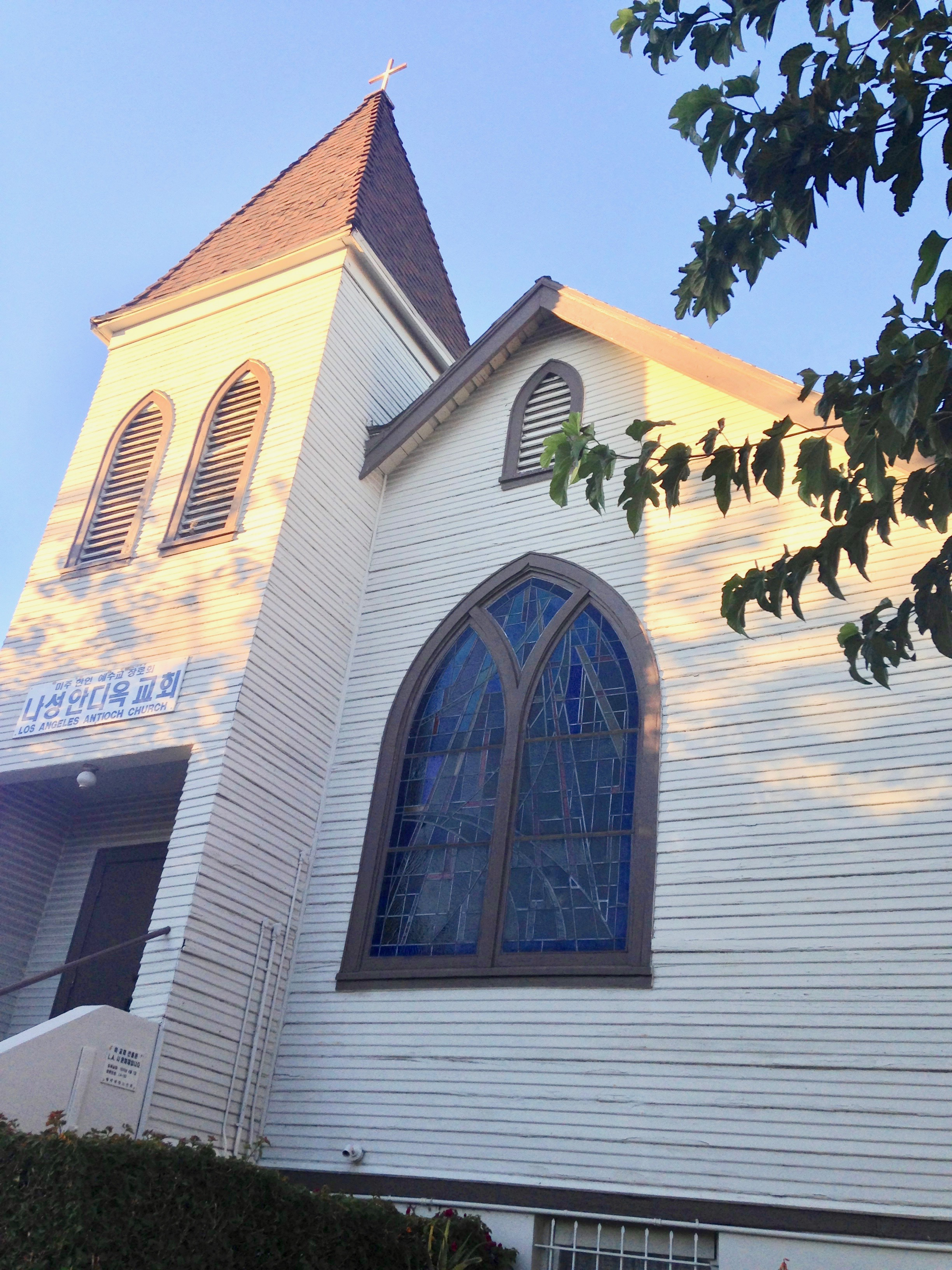

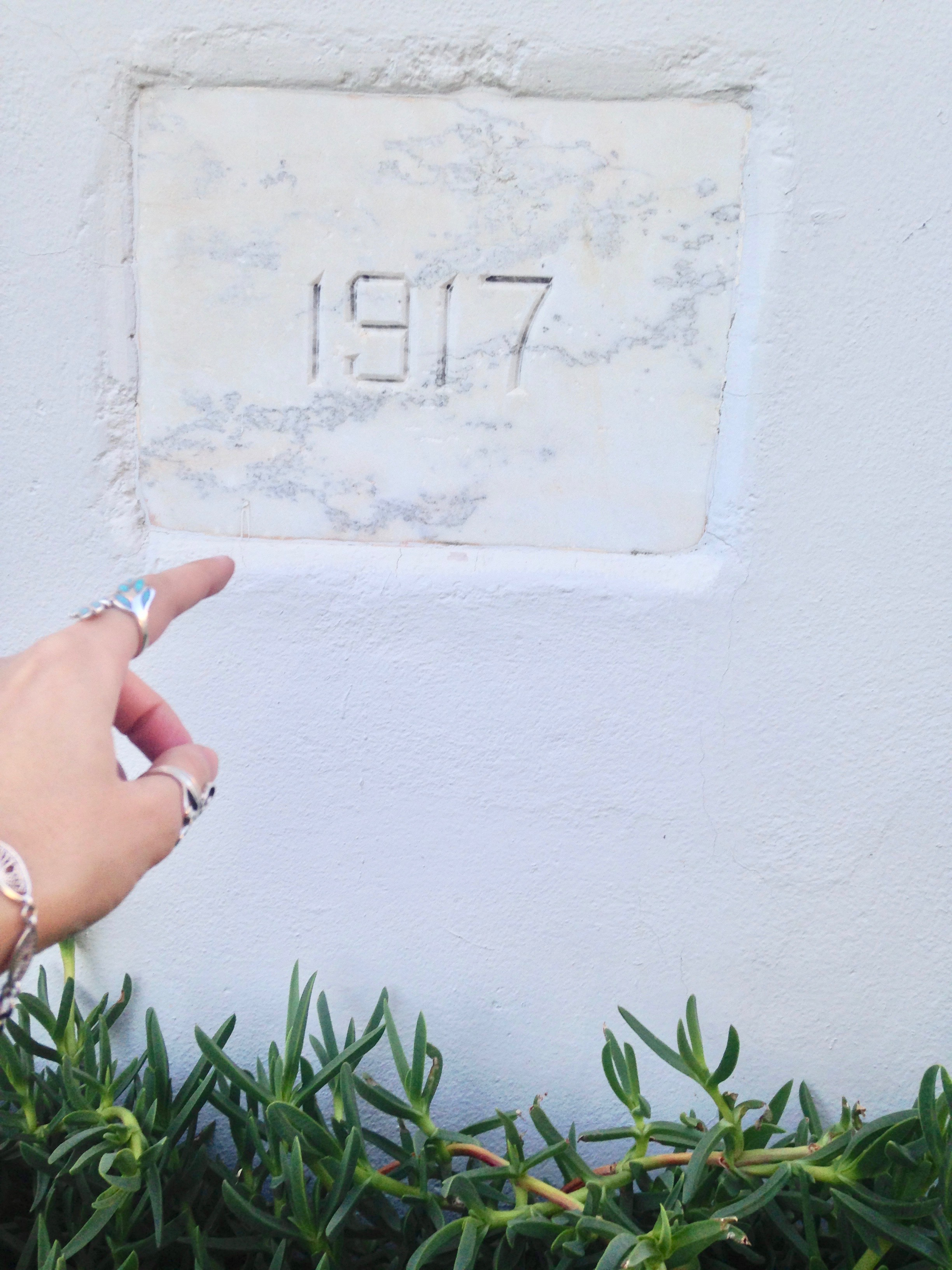

== See also ==
- List of Los Angeles Historic-Cultural Monuments in the San Fernando Valley
- History of the San Fernando Valley to 1915
