= Oakwood Memorial Park Cemetery =

Cemetery in Los Angeles County, California

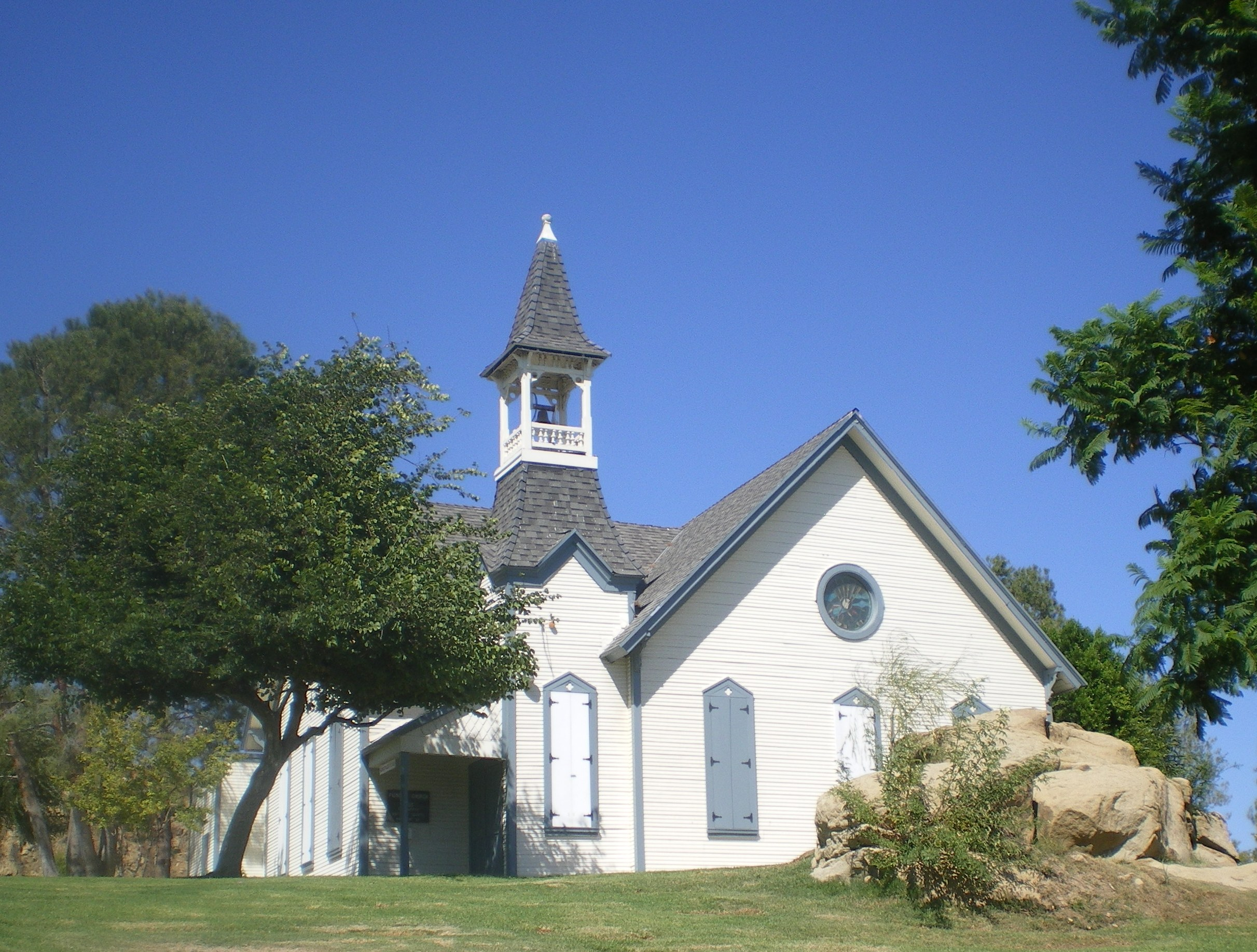
- Historic Chatsworth Community Church located on grounds of Oakwood Memorial Park
- Interactive map of Oakwood Memorial Park Cemetery

Details
- Established: 1924
- Location: Chatsworth, Los Angeles, California
- Country: United States
- Coordinates: 34°15′11″N 118°37′12″W
- Type: Public
- Find a Grave: Oakwood Memorial Park Cemetery

The Oakwood Memorial Park Cemetery is located at 22601 Lassen Street, Chatsworth, Los Angeles, California. It is the resting place for famous movie stars such as Fred Astaire, Ginger Rogers, Gloria Grahame, and Stephen Boyd.

== History and description ==
Oakwood Memorial Park is located in the San Fernando Valley, surrounded by rocky hills that have served as a backdrop for many a film setting. It has been used as a cemetery since 1924, and there was a Native American graveyard next to the cemetery before a fire destroyed the old wooden crosses that marked the site. The Old Stagecoach Trail passed beside it. The historic Chatsworth Community Church, which is designated as Los Angeles Historic-Cultural Monument No. 14, is located within the cemetery grounds.

== Notable burials ==
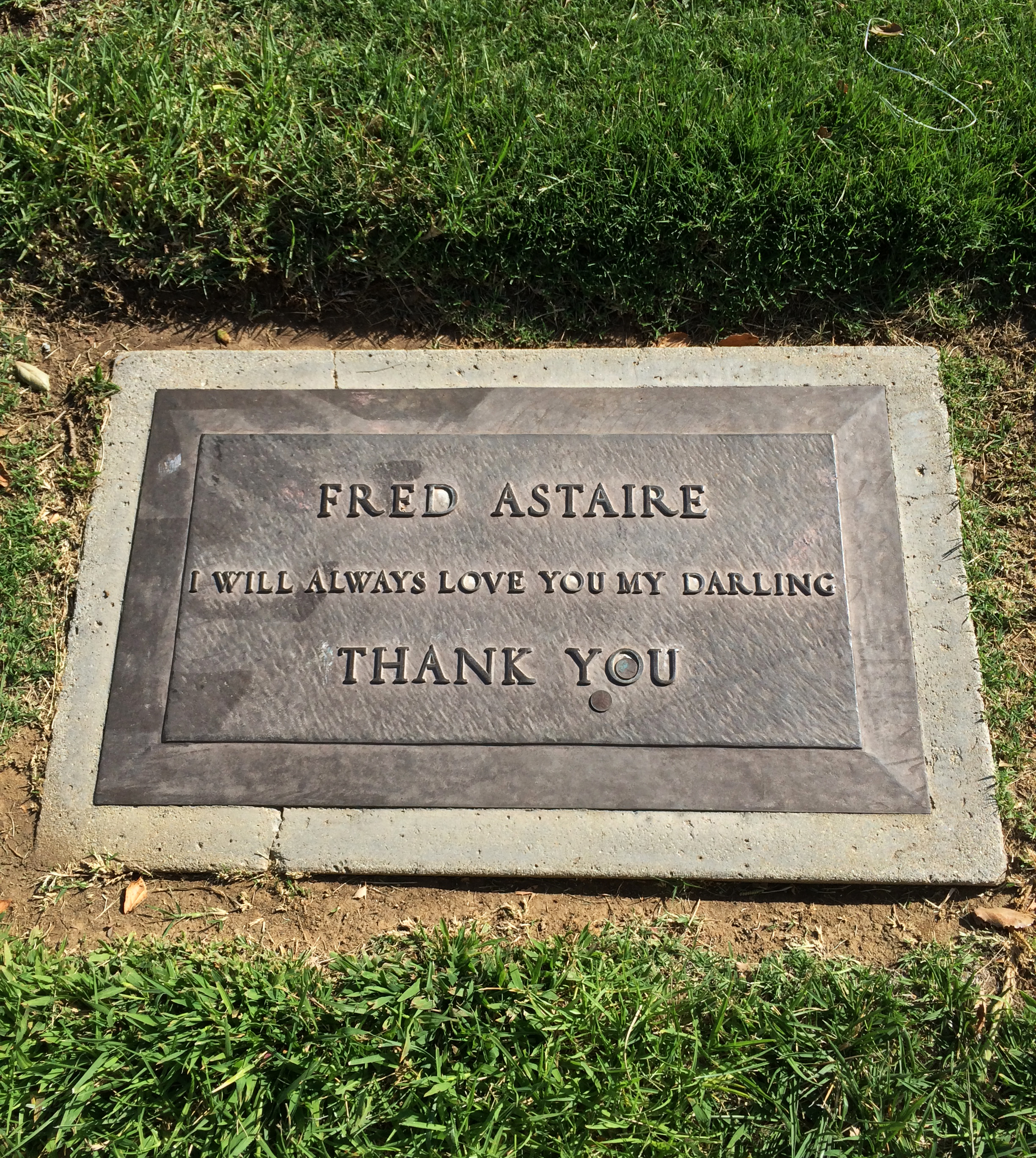
Grave of Fred Astaire

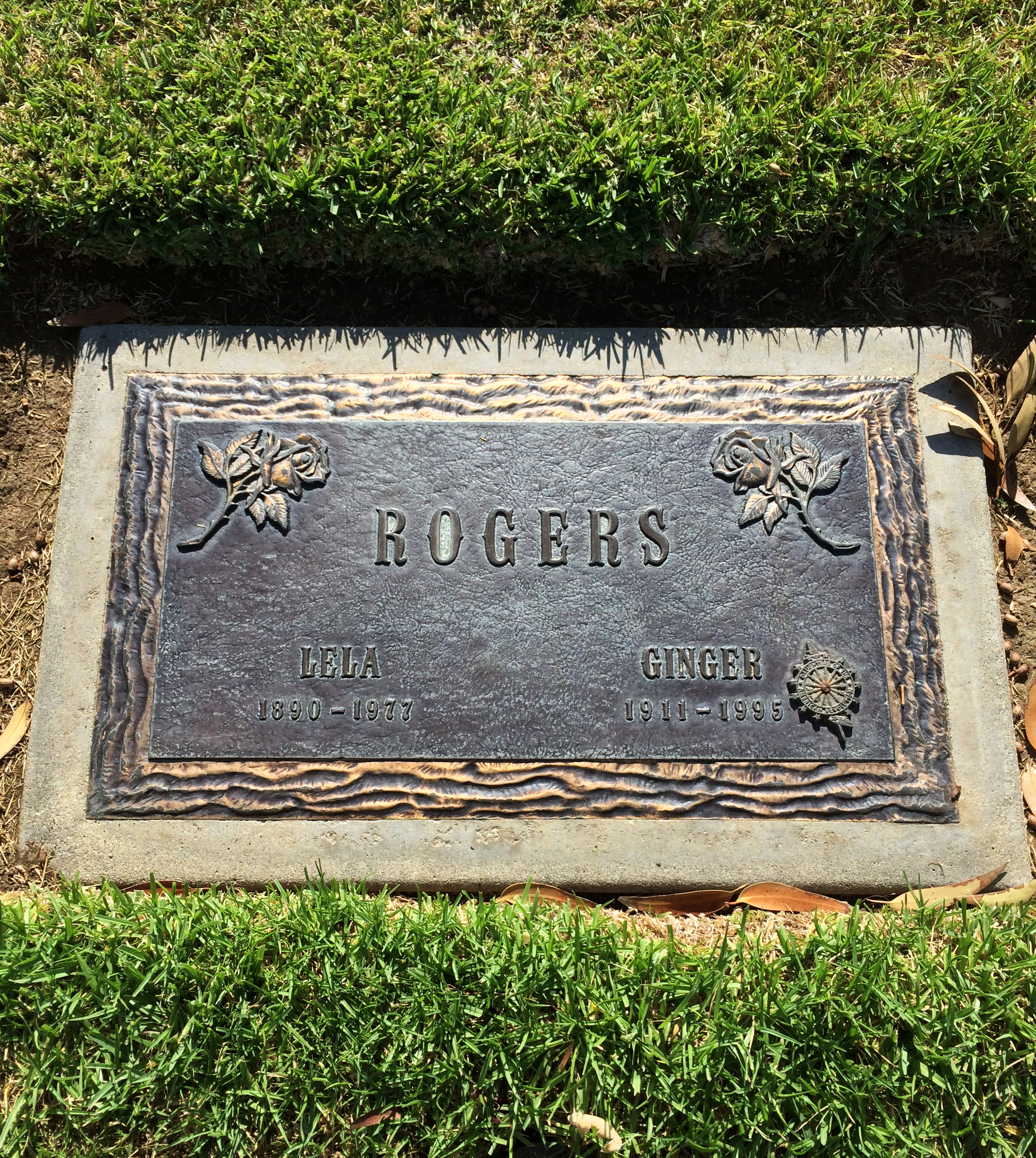
Grave of Ginger Rogers

Notables buried here include:

- Adele Astaire (1897–1981), actress, dancer
- Fred Astaire (1899–1987), actor, singer, dancer
- Joe Don Baker (1936–2025), actor
- Dehl Berti (1921–1991), actor
- Derya Arbaş Berti (1968–2003), actress
- Stephen Boyd (1928–1977), actor
- Scott Bradley (1891-1977), composer
- Grace Cunard (1893–1967), actress, screenwriter, director
- Lloyd G. Davies (1914–1957), Los Angeles City Council member, 1943–1951
- Frank Kelly Freas (1922–2005), illustrator
- Gloria Grahame (1923–1981), actress
- Raymond Greenleaf (1892–1963), actor
- Russell Hayden (1912–1981), actor
- Jack Ingram (1902–1969), actor
- Al Jennings (1863–1961), lawyer, outlaw, actor
- Adele Jergens (1917–2002), actress
- Milton Kibbee (1896–1970), actor
- Dorothy Mackaye (1899–1940), actress
- Montie Montana (1910–1998), cowboy
- Freddie Perren (1943–2004), songwriter, record producer
- Richard Reeves (1912–1967), character actor best known for playing henchmen and thugs
- Floyd Roberts (1900–1939), Indianapolis 500 winner
- Ginger Rogers (1911–1995), actress, singer, dancer
- Robert Sampson (1933–2020), actor
- Mark Schaeffer (1948–2022), baseball player
- Robert F. Simon (1908–1992), actor
- Ted Snyder (1881–1965), composer
- Ken Spears (1938–2020), animator
- Robert Strange (1881–1952), actor
- Ken Terrell (1904–1966), actor
- Henry Victor (1892–1945), actor
- Gregory Walcott (1928–2015), actor
- Nydia Westman (1902–1970), actress
- Dallas Willard (1935–2013), Christian philosopher
- Walter Tetley (1915-1975), voice actor Felix the cat 1919-1959
- Earl Holliman (1928-2024), actor

== See also ==
- List of United States cemeteries
