= Lassen Street olive trees =

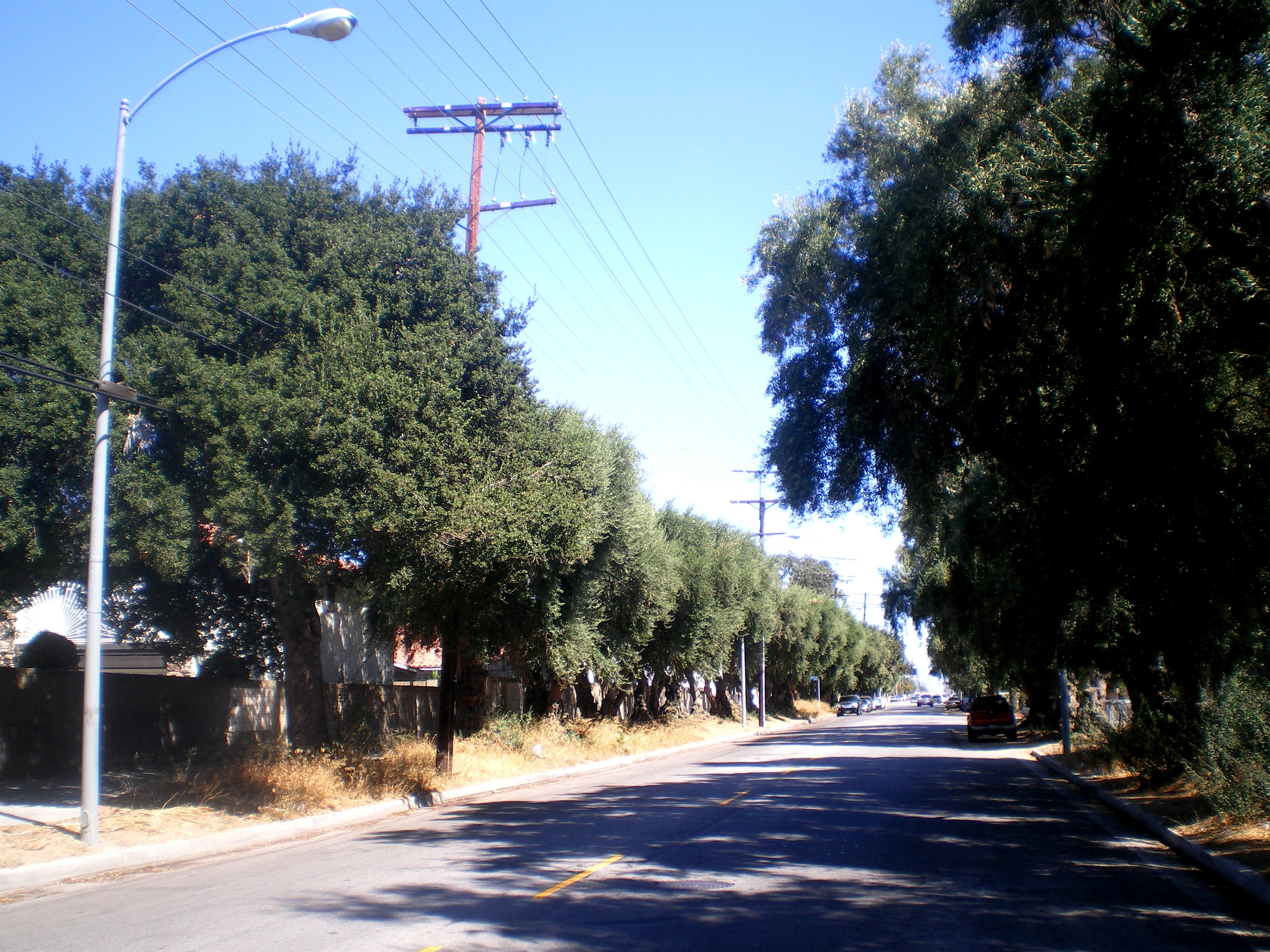
- Lassen Street olive trees (2009).

- Location within the Los Angeles metropolitan area
- Location: Lassen Street, between Topanga Canyon Boulevard & Farralone Avenue, Chatsworth, Los Angeles, California

History
- Built: 1903

Site notes
- Governing body: City of Los Angeles

Los Angeles Historic-Cultural Monument
- Designated: May 10, 1967
- Reference no.: 49

The Lassen Street olive trees, also known as 76 mature olive trees, are a Los Angeles Historic-Cultural Monument located along Lassen Street between Topanga Canyon Boulevard and Farralone Avenue in the Chatsworth community of the northwestern San Fernando Valley, in Los Angeles, California.

== History ==
A row of olive trees (olea europaea) were planted in 1893 along a then dirt road by Nelson A. Gray. The Grays moved from Pasadena to Chatsworth in 1892. The trees are believed to have been grown from cuttings taken from the olive orchard at the Mission San Fernando Rey de España.

The trees were designated a Historic-Cultural Monument in May 1967. According to the Chatsworth Daughters of the American Revolution chapter, there were 68 trees surviving/remaining in the 2010s.

== See also ==
- History of the San Fernando Valley
- List of Los Angeles Historic-Cultural Monuments in the San Fernando Valley
