= Minnie Hill Palmer House =

Historic house in California, United States

- U.S. National Register of Historic Places
- Los Angeles Historic-Cultural Monument
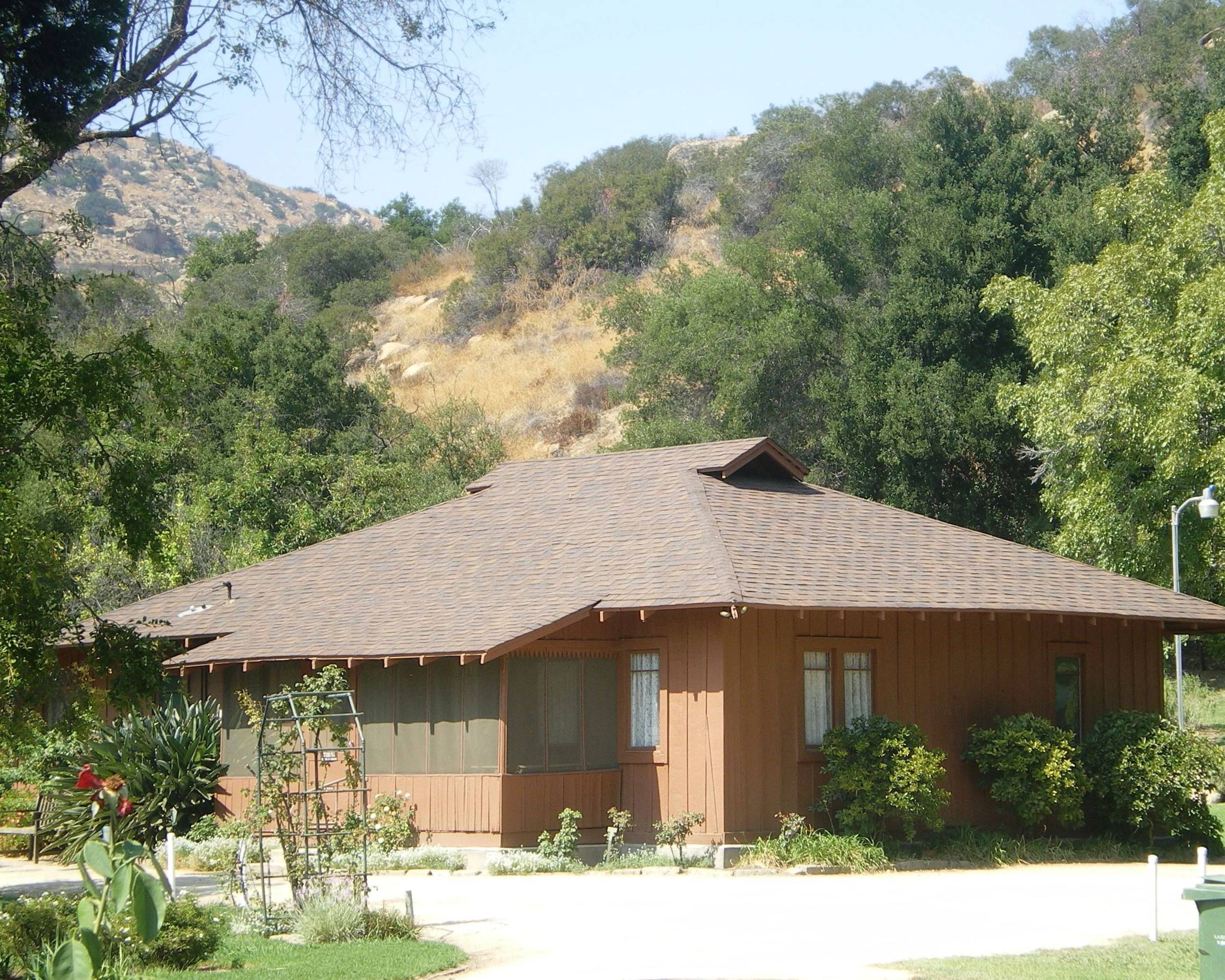
- Minnie Hill Palmer House, September 2008

- Location within the Los Angeles metropolitan area Location within California Location within the United States
- Location: 10385 Shadow Oak Drive, Chatsworth, Los Angeles, California
- Coordinates: 34°15′40″N 118°36′53″W
- Built: 1911
- Architect: Hill, Lovell; Johnson, Willard
- Architectural style: Stick-Eastlake American Craftsman-Bungalow
- NRHP reference No.: 79000480
- LAHCM No.: 133

Significant dates
- Added to NRHP: September 4, 1979
- Designated LAHCM: November 20, 1974

The Minnie Hill Palmer House, also known as The Homestead Acre, is the only remaining homestead cottage in the San Fernando Valley. The cottage is a redwood Stick-Eastlake style American Craftsman-Bungalow located on a 1.3-acre (0.53 ha) site in Chatsworth Park South in the Chatsworth section of Los Angeles, California.

== History ==
Exercising their rights under the Homestead Act, James David and Rhonda Jane Hill settled in 1886 on 110 acres (45 ha) of land in what is now Chatsworth. The ranch was later expanded to 230 acres (93 ha) when the Hills bought an adjoining 120-acre (49 ha) ranch where the old stage stop, abandoned with the arrival of the railroads, had been located. Today, a 1.3 acres (5,300 m^{2}) portion has been preserved and been recognized as a historic site. In late 1886, the Hills' seventh child, Minnie (1886-1981) was born on the ranch. The Hill family built the surviving three-bedroom bungalow between 1911 and 1913 after the original homestead was torn down.

Minnie Hill married Alfred Palmer in 1908 and moved to Hawthorne, California, later relocating to Montana where she and her husband farmed. Minnie Hill Palmer and her husband returned to the Chatsworth homestead in 1920 when Minnie's mother became ill. Minnie's brother, Lovell Hill, ran the homestead with the Palmers and operated a dynamite supply business from the site. Lovell inherited the property upon the death of their mother, and Minnie inherited it when Lovell died. Her husband died in the 1940s, and she sold the ranch to the City of Los Angeles in 1956 for development into a city golf course and rifle range, with the condition that she maintain a life estate allowing her to live rent- and tax-free on the remaining homestead parcel. Palmer continued to live at the cottage until age 90, raising vegetables, canning fruit, and living in the pioneer style. She used an antique handplow to work on her fruits and vegetables every morning, plowing land located alongside the golf course, often having to remove errant golf balls as well as weeds from her garden. She continued to raise her own fruits and vegetables and canned 300 jars of old-fashioned jelly each year for Christmas gifts. She later recalled that gophers and coyotes were always a problem on the ranch. When fires devastated the area in 1970, she refused to evacuate and worked alongside firefighters to save the old homestead. The one modern convenience Ms. Palmer enjoyed was television soap operas, which she watched faithfully from 11 a.m. until 3:30 p.m. after working in the garden. When a reporter from the Los Angeles Times visited the homestead in 1968 to write a feature article about her, she cut the interview short at 11 a.m., noting that she refused to speak to visitors or answer the phone while her soap operas were on. She suffered a stroke in 1976 and spent her final years at the Mountain View Sanatarium in Sylmar, California. Palmer died in March 1981 at age 94.

== Ownership and operation as a museum ==
The Homestead Acre and Palmer House have been preserved as they were in 1911 when the surviving cottage was built. It is owned by the City of Los Angeles Department of Recreation and Parks and maintained by the Chatsworth Historical Society as a monument to the pioneers who homesteaded the San Fernando Valley. The city maintains the building's exterior, and the Chatsworth Historical Society maintains the interior. The park was closed in early 2008 when lead contamination was found, but the park re-opened in April 2008 after being found to be safe. The Chatsworth Historical Society conducts tours of the cottage by appointment for groups of 10 or more and on the first Sunday of the month from 1-4 p.m. Many of the trees and flowers on the property were planted by Minnie Hill Palmer and her family. According to the Los Angeles Department of Recreation and Parks, the Palmer House has become a popular location for weddings and private parties and is also rented as a movie location.

== Historic designation ==
The Hill Palmer House was designated as a Los Angeles Historic-Cultural Monument (HCM #133) in 1974. Members of the City of Los Angeles Cultural Heritage Commission noted that the house warranted monument status based on the significant life cycle of Ms. Palmer at the property and the part she and her family and house played in the area's history. It was also listed in the National Register of Historic Places in 1979. It is the last remaining homestead in the San Fernando Valley.

== See also ==
- List of Registered Historic Places in Los Angeles
- List of Los Angeles Historic-Cultural Monuments in the San Fernando Valley
