= Saint Saviour's Chapel (Harvard-Westlake School) =

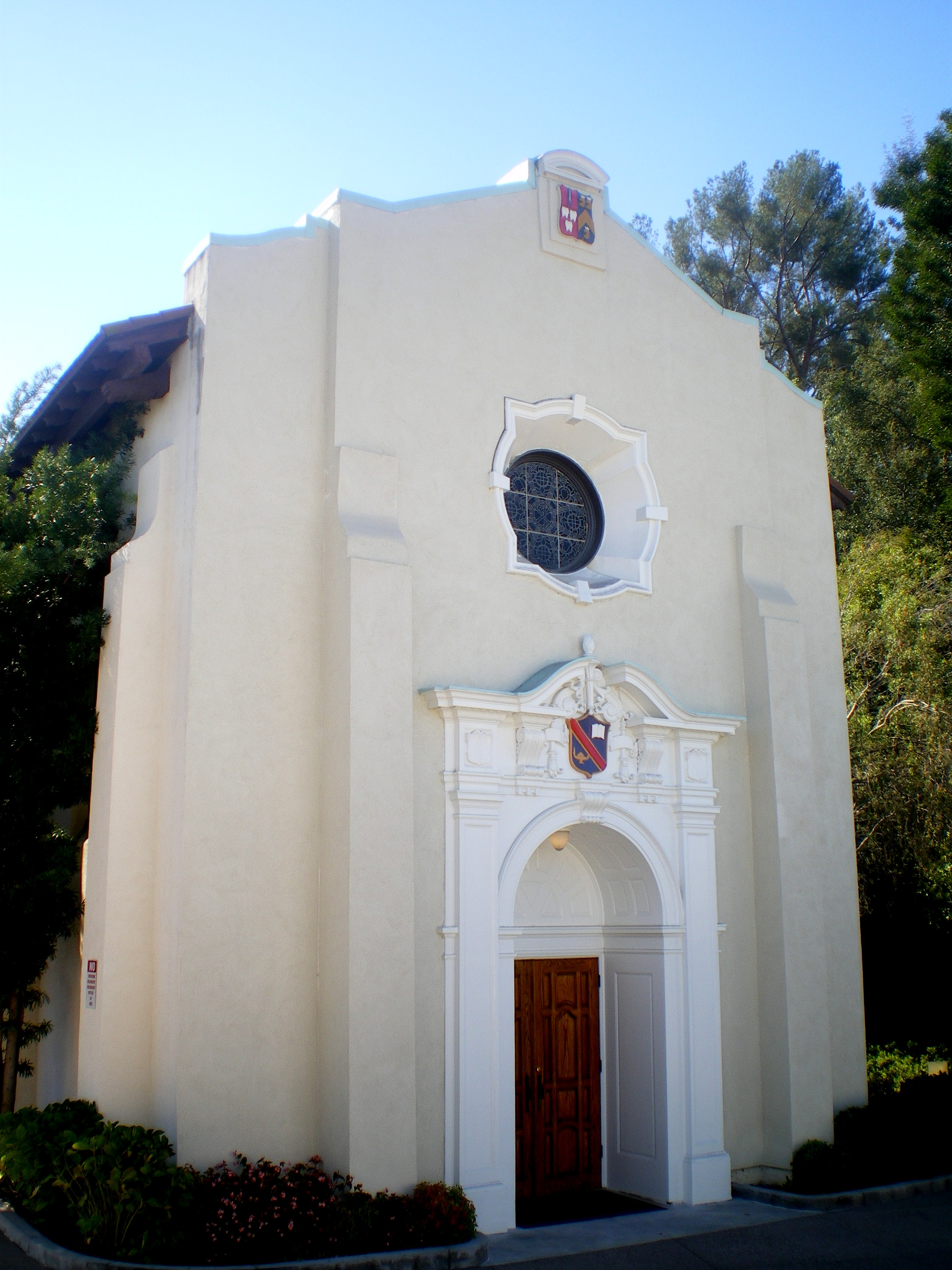
- Saint Saviour's Chapel, September 2008
- Interactive map of Saint Saviour's Chapel
- Location: Harvard-Westlake School grounds, 12825 Hacienda Dr, Studio City, Los Angeles, California
- Coordinates: 34.140636°N 118.410926°W
- Built: 1914
- Architect: Reginald Johnson
- Governing body: private

Los Angeles Historic-Cultural Monument
- Designated: February 5, 1966
- Reference no.: 32

Saint Saviour's Chapel is a chapel on the grounds of the Harvard-Westlake School in the Studio City section of Los Angeles, California. A Los Angeles Historic-Cultural Monument (No. #32), the chapel was patterned after the Chapel at Rugby School in England. Its pews face the center aisle, and it is considered an excellent example of the collegiate chapel style. It also features a large rood cross made by students in the school's wood shop. The chapel was built in 1914 at the original campus of the Harvard School at Western Avenue and Venice Boulevard. It was designed by Reginald Johnson, the son of the first Episcopal bishop of Los Angeles. When the campus moved to its present Studio City location in 1937, the chapel was divided into sixteen pieces and moved to the new campus through Sepulveda Pass via Sepulveda Boulevard.

In 1964, as part of the celbration of the chapel's 50th anniversary, twelve new stained-glass windows were installed in the chapel. The windows were designed by the school's chaplain, Rev. John S. Gill, and built by Judson Studios.

== See also ==
- List of Los Angeles Historic-Cultural Monuments in the San Fernando Valley
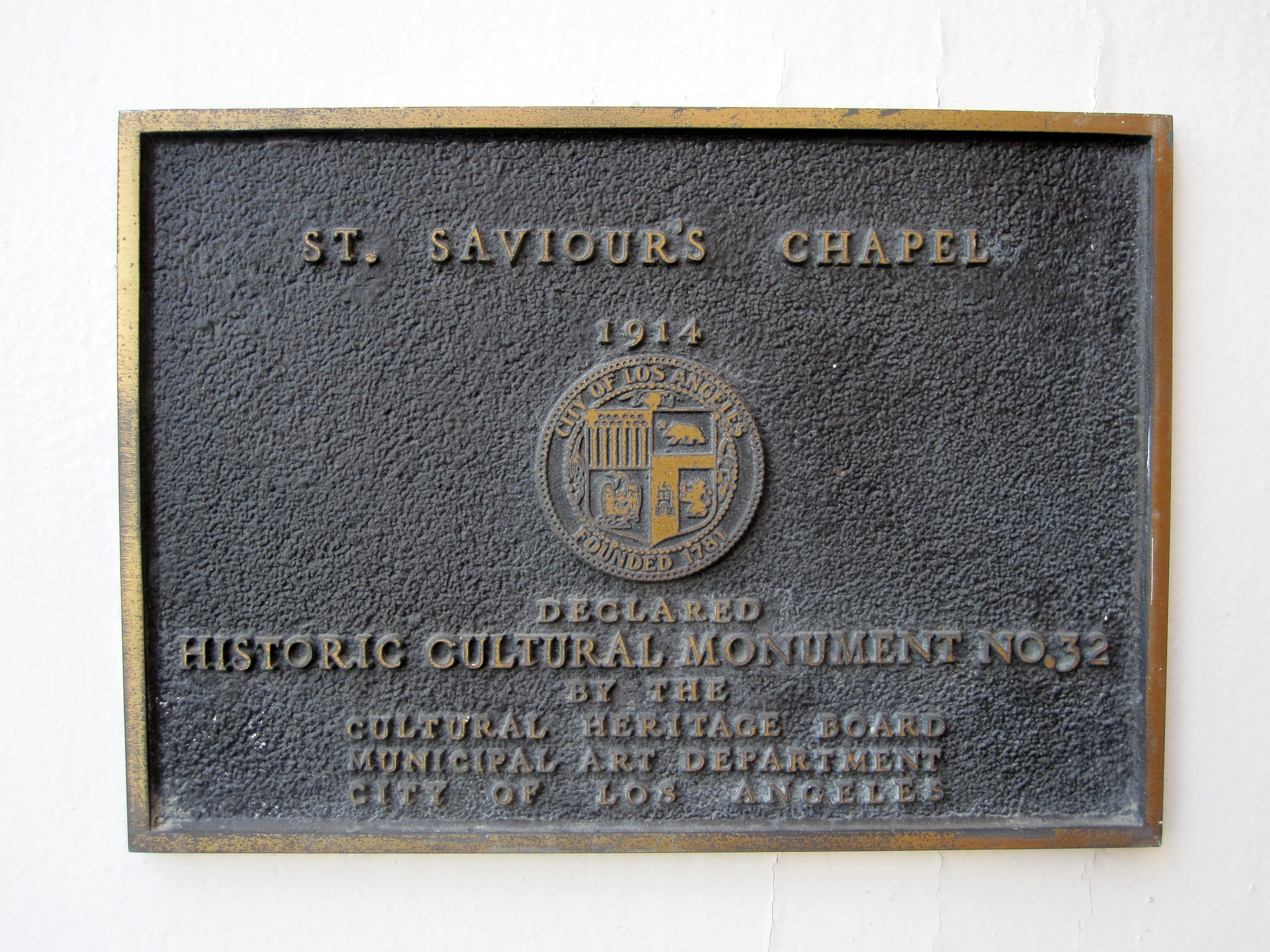
Signage

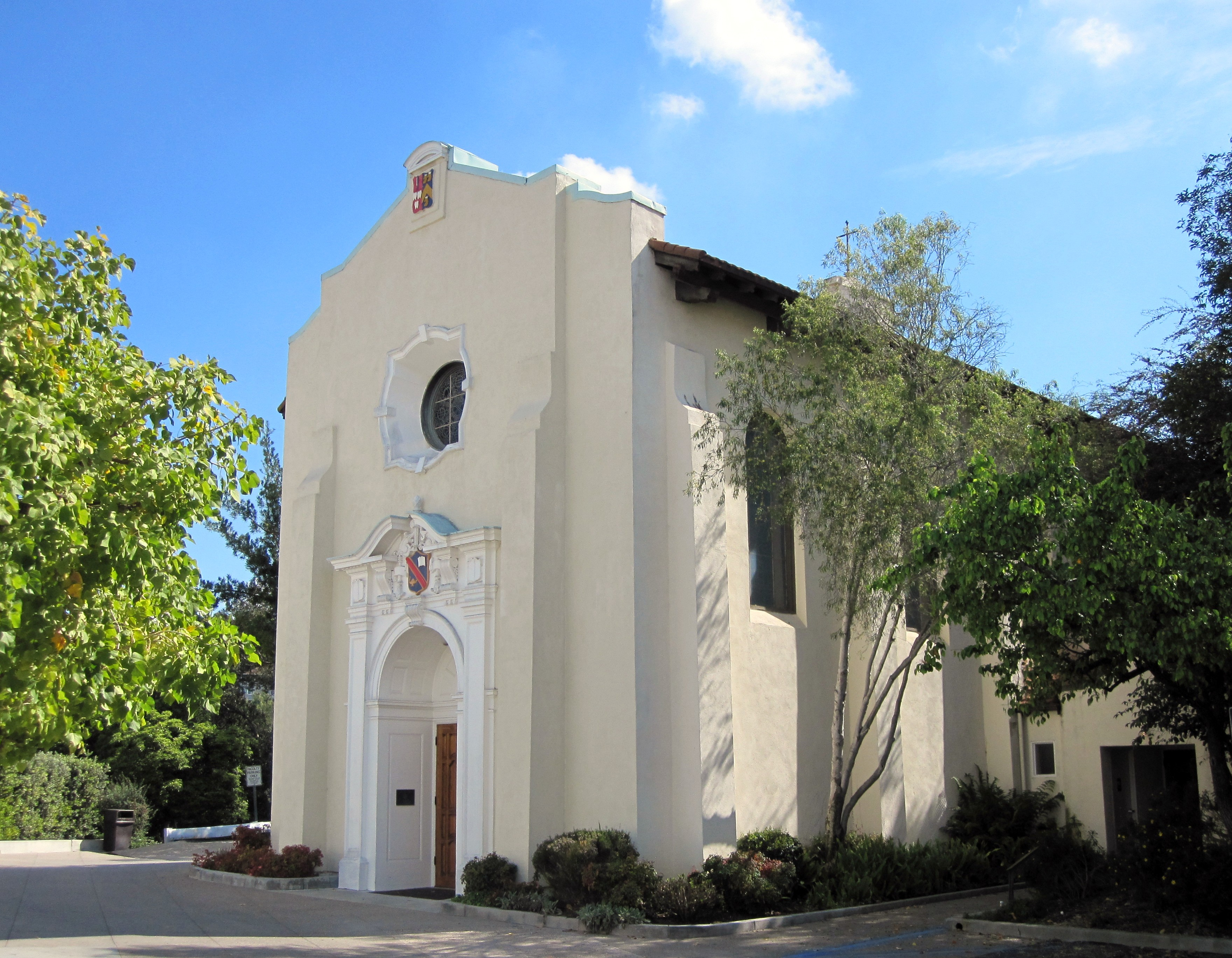
Side view

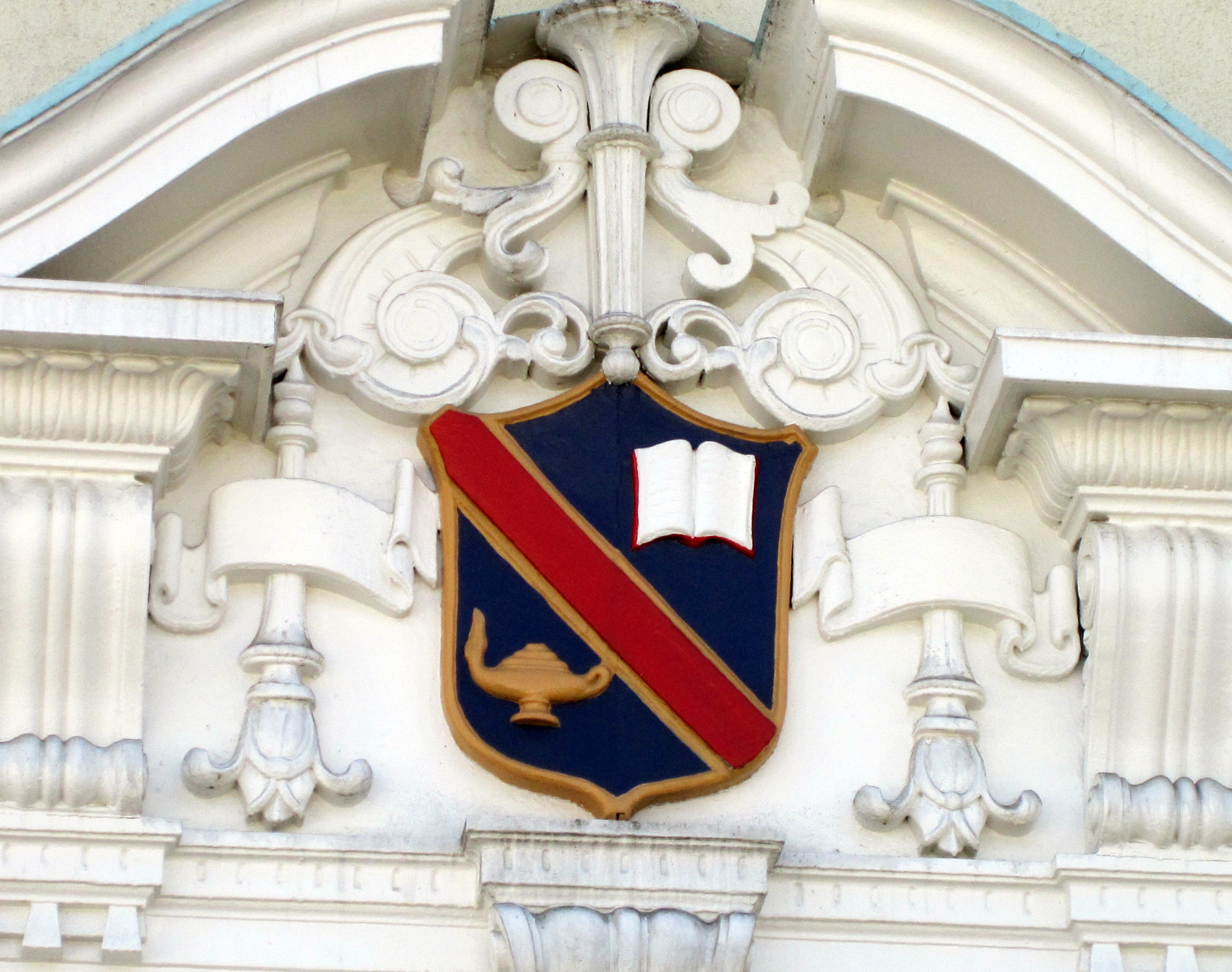
Emblem

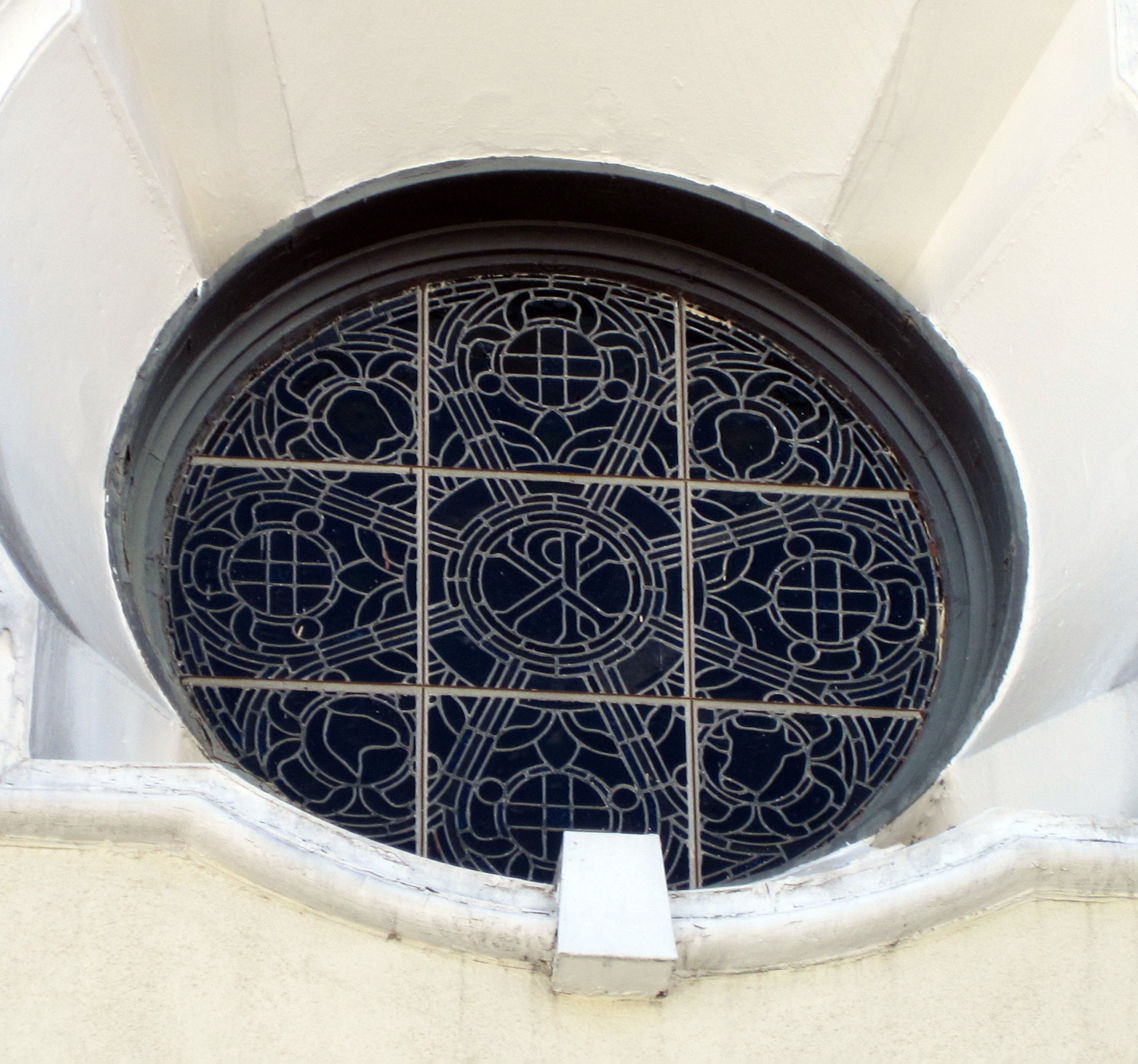
Window

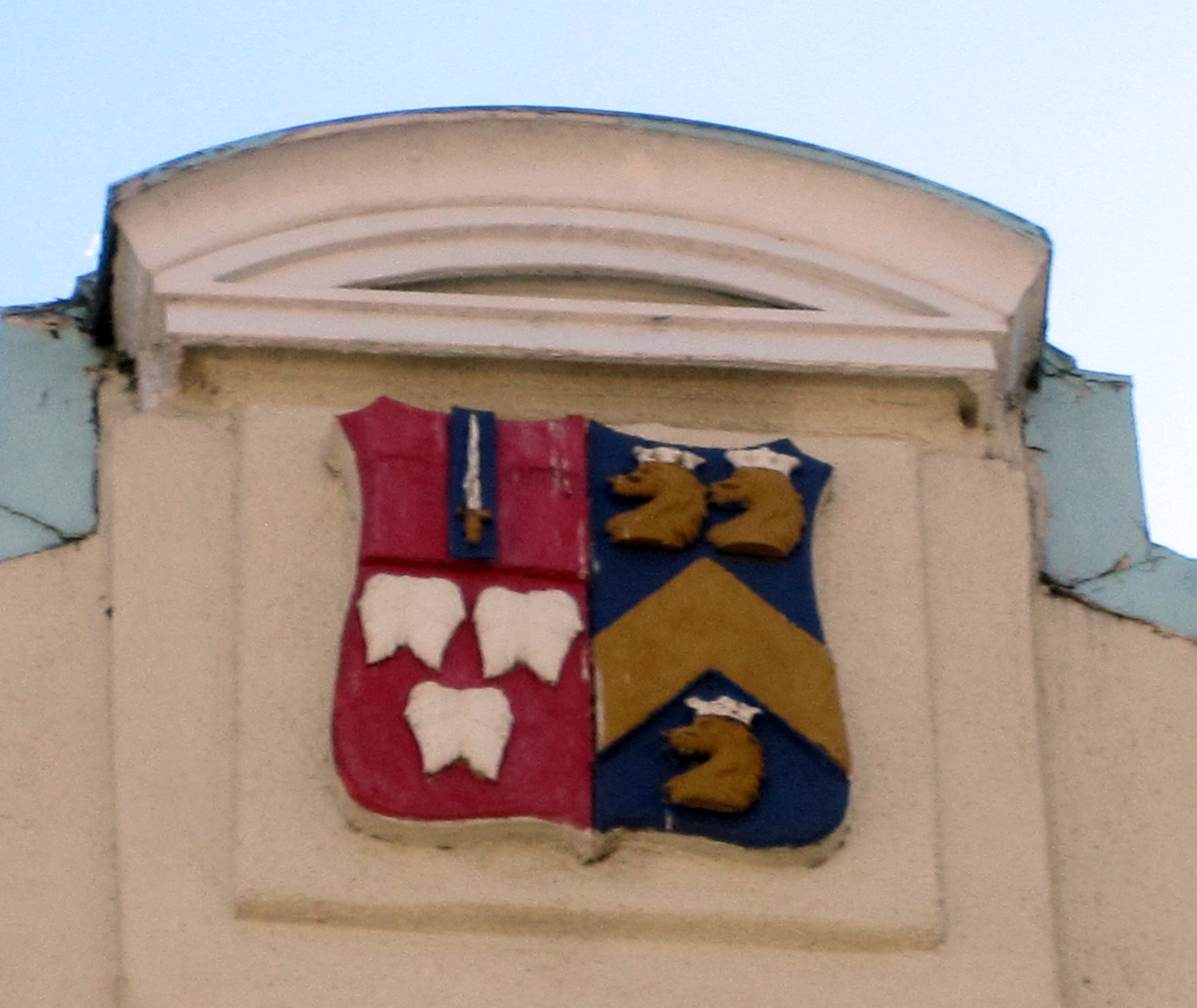
Emblem
