= Derya Arbaş =

Turkish-American actress (1968–2003)

- Photo of Derya Arbas
- Born: Derya Zerrin Berti; June 17, 1968; Santa Monica, California, U.S.
- Died: October 22, 2003 (aged 35); Los Angeles, California, U.S.
- Education: Howard Fine Acting Studio; California Institute of the Arts
- Occupation: Actress
- Years active: 1985–2003
- Spouse: Nihat Polat (m. 1986; div. 1989)
- Parent(s): Dehl Berti; Zerrin Arbaş
- Relatives: Avni Arbaş (grandfather)

Derya Arbaş (born Derya Zerrin Berti; June 17, 1968 – October 22, 2003) was a Turkish American actress.

== Biography ==
Derya Arbaş Berti was the daughter of Turkish beauty queen and actress Zerrin Arbaş and Native American actor Dehl Berti. She was the granddaughter of Avni Arbaş; a renowned Turkish artist of Circassian descent.

Her parents divorced when she was an infant and Arbaş grew up in Southern California with Dehl Berti, his second wife and two half brothers. She had dual U.S. and Turkish citizenship and split her time between both countries. In Los Angeles, Arbaş, who starred in seven movies, was a member of the Screen Actors Guild.

In 1992, she won one of the major three roles in "Scarlett Finals" in Atlanta on October 4, 1992. She died from a drug-related heart attack at age 35 on October 21, 2003. She is interred at Oakwood Memorial Park Cemetery in Chatsworth, Los Angeles.

== Filmography ==
- Kuyucaklı Yusuf (1985) (Turkish Movie)
- Alev Gibi (1986) (Turkish Movie)
- Bitmeyen Sevda (1986) (Turkish Movie)
- Bir Günlük Aşk (1986) (Turkish Movie)
- Dilan (1986) (Turkish Movie)
- Beyaz Bisiklet (1986) (Turkish Movie)
- Gece, Melek ve Bizim Çocuklar (1993) (Turkish Movie)
- Silk Stalkings Love Never Dies (U.S.A. TV Series - 1993)
- The Night, the Angel and Our Gang (1994)
- Çılgın Badiler (1996) (Turkish Movie)
- Hang Your Dog in the Wind (1997) (U.S.A.)
- Cinler ve Periler (2001) (Turkish Movie)
- Günah (2001) (Turkish Movie)
