= Canoga Mission Gallery =

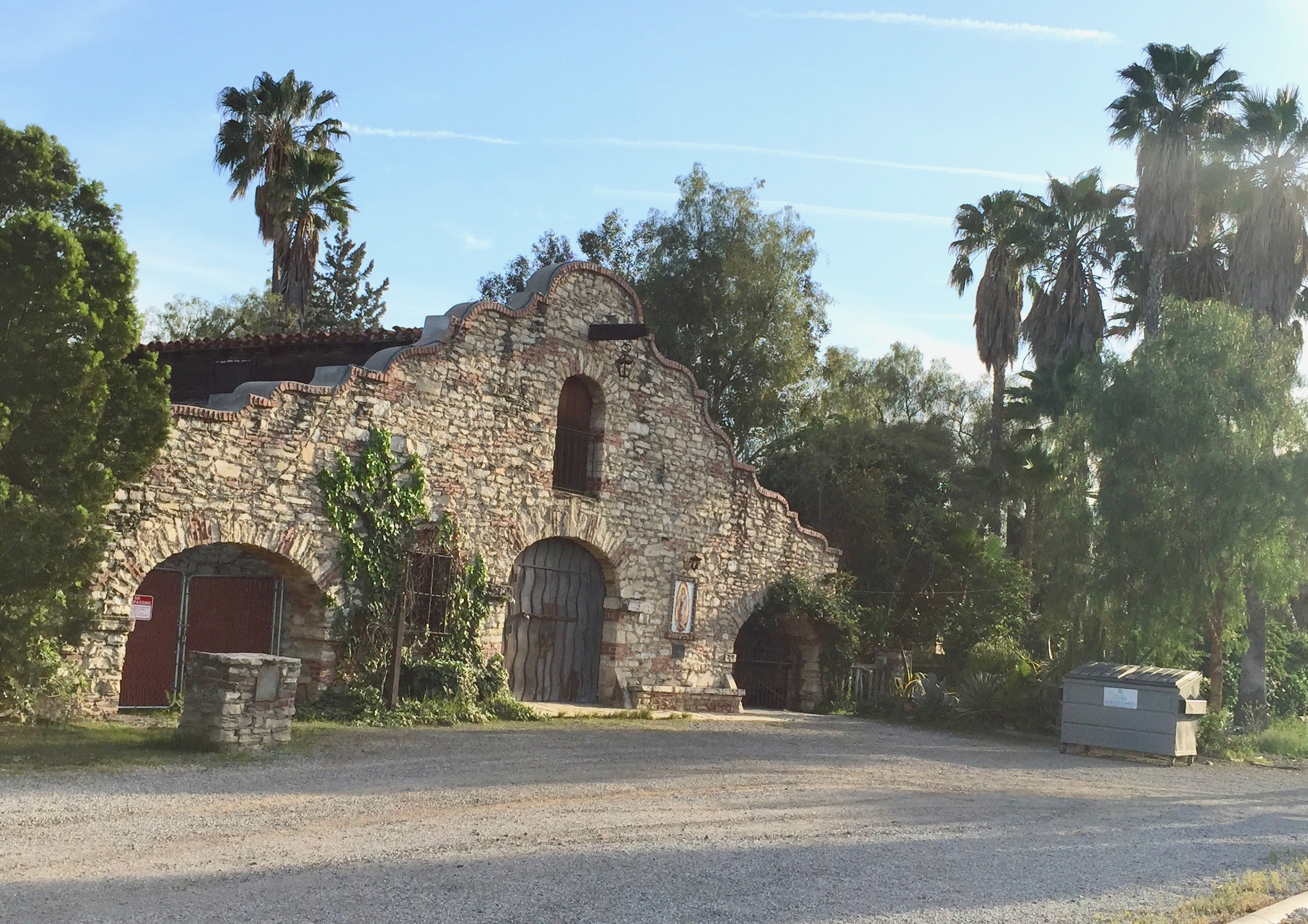
The Mission Gallery in March 2016.

The Canoga Mission Gallery is a repurposed horse stable in Canoga Park, CA. It is Los Angeles Historic-Cultural Monument No. 135.

== History ==
The Canoga Mission Gallery, modeled after the San Luis Rey Mission, was built as stables in 1936 for the Francis Lederer Estate. In 1963, the stables became the Canoga Mission Community Art Center, with an emphasis on exhibiting California artists and offering art classes. Run by sculptor David Brockman and John Naftzger, the non-profit center was taken over by Francis Lederer's wife, Marion Lederer, in 1967 and changed its name to Canoga Mission Gallery. Jody Hutchison and Mary and Obdulio Galeana also ran the center alongside Marion. Art was exhibited, art films were shown, and jazz music was played at the gallery. In 1975, the center was designated as Los Angeles Historic-Cultural Monument No. 135. Artists who showed work at the gallery included Robert Flame, Flavio Cabral, Atanas Katchamakoff, Saul Bernstein, Guy Maccoy, Harold Schwarm, Vance Studley, Doug Edge, Sokicho Suga, John Morris, Frances Saslow, Fritz Faiss, Joseph Vogel, Jim Sullivan, Virginia Carpenter, Charles Bowdlear, Howard Tollefson, Sandra Tollefson, and Lee Whitten.

The gallery eventually closed, later becoming Malibu Wines & Beer Garden.

== Gallery ==
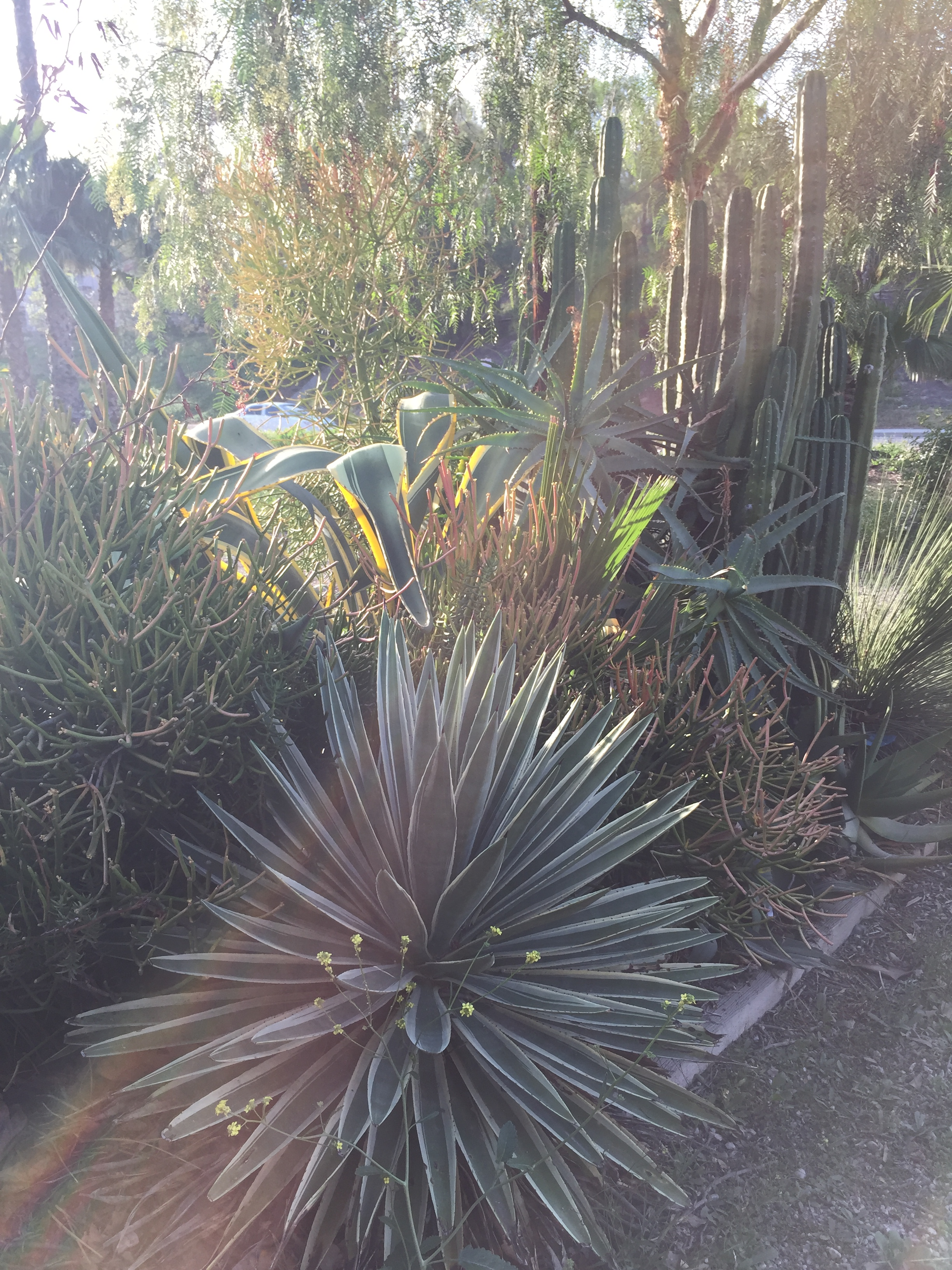

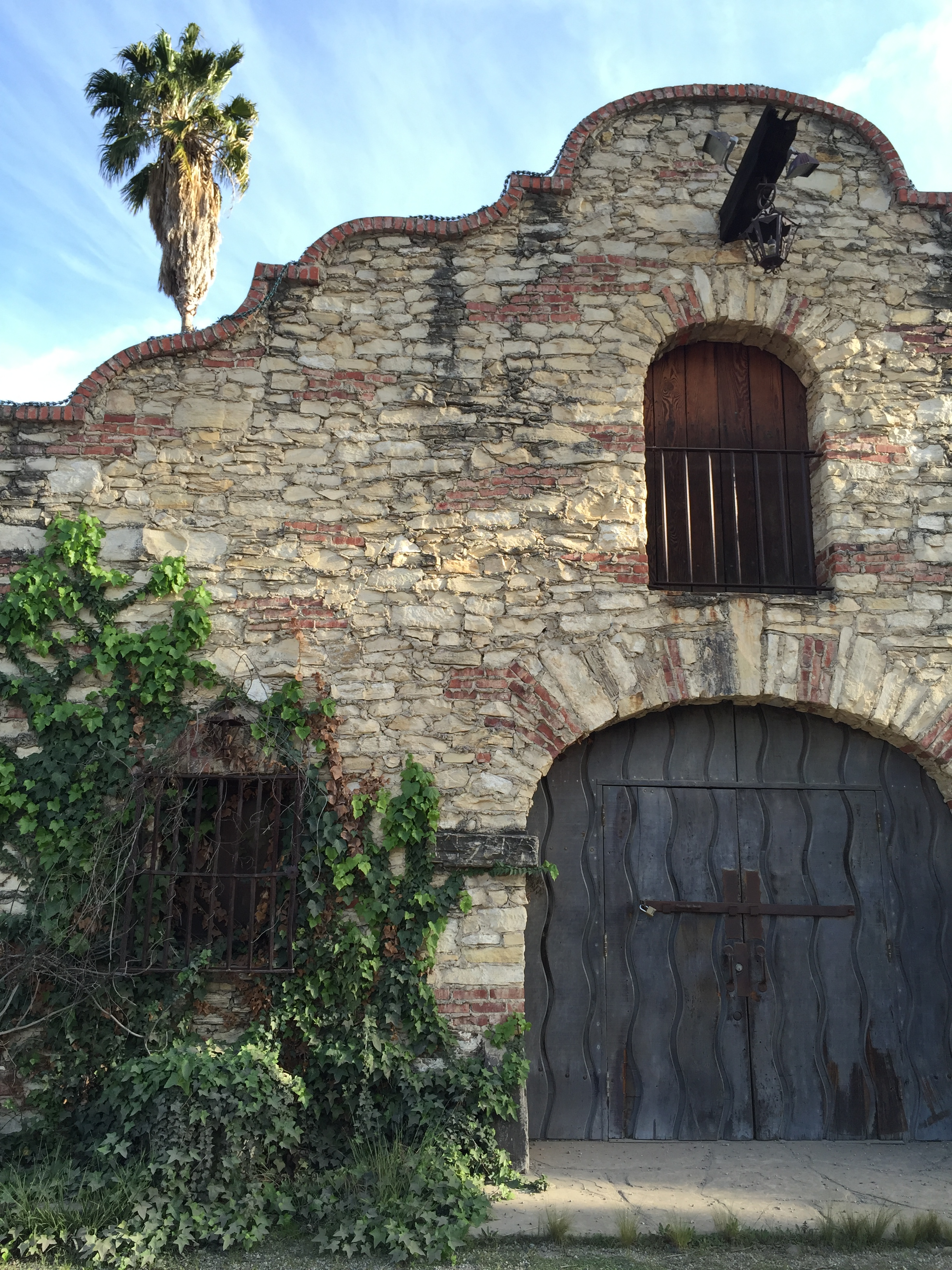

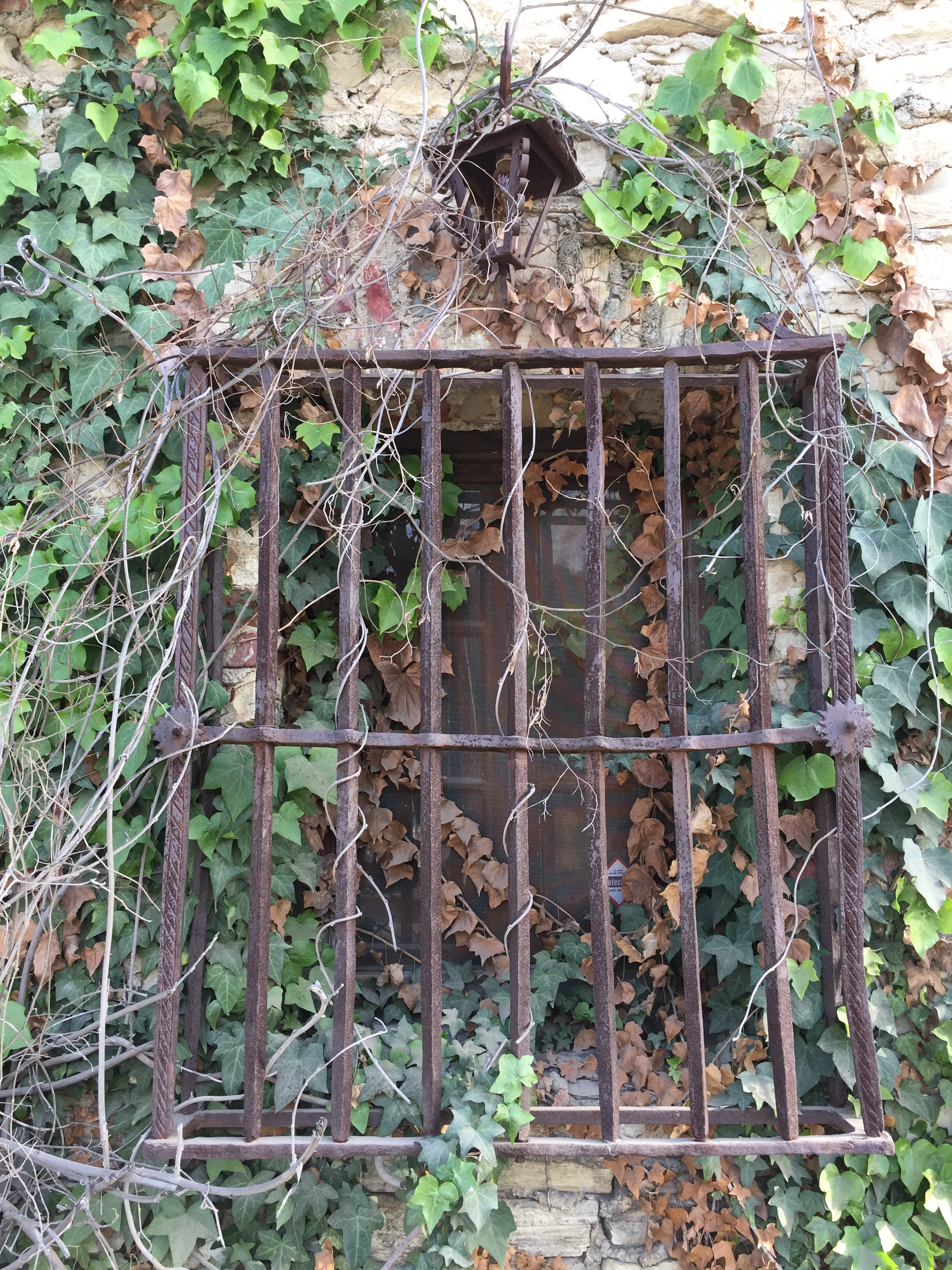

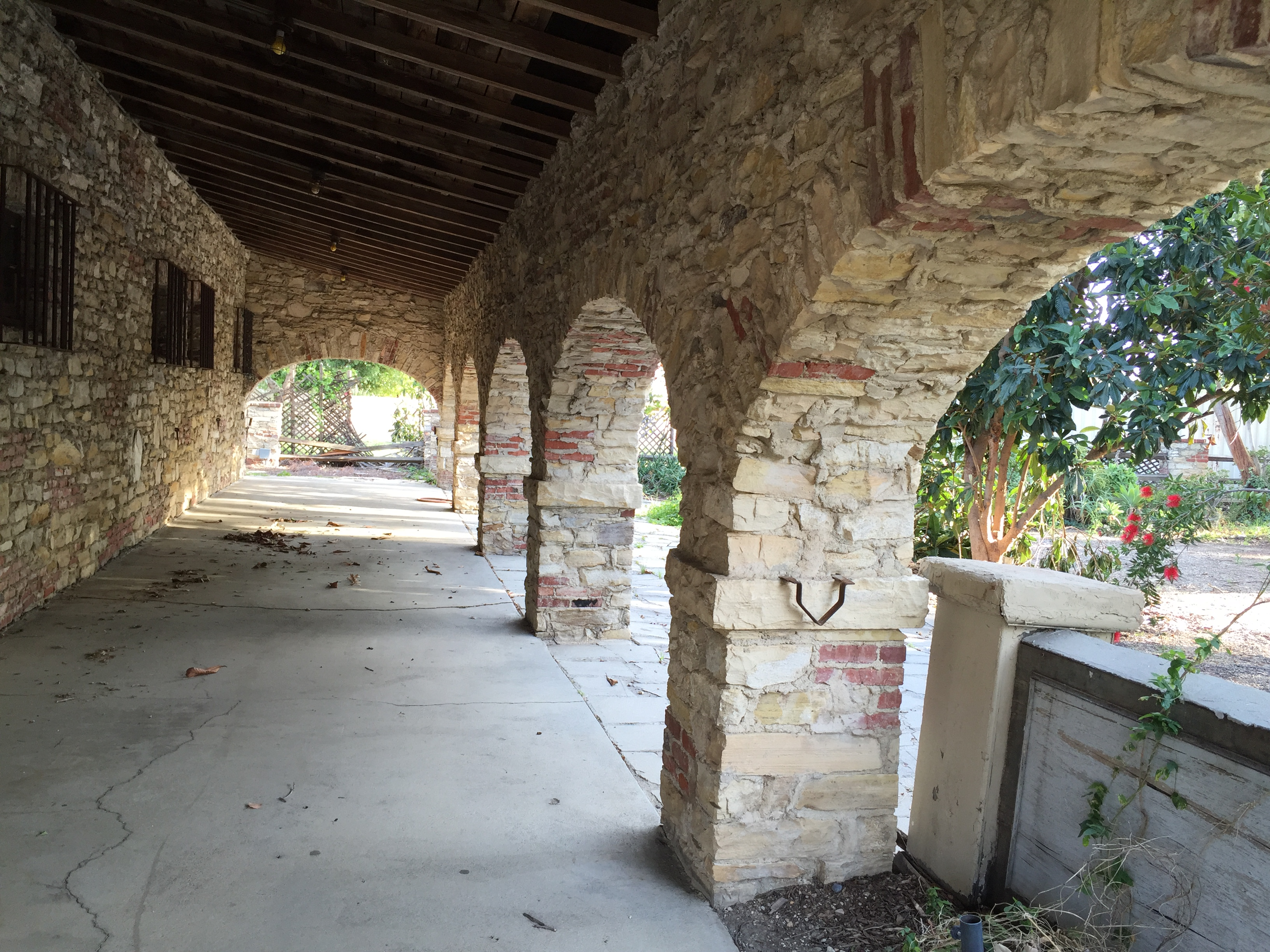

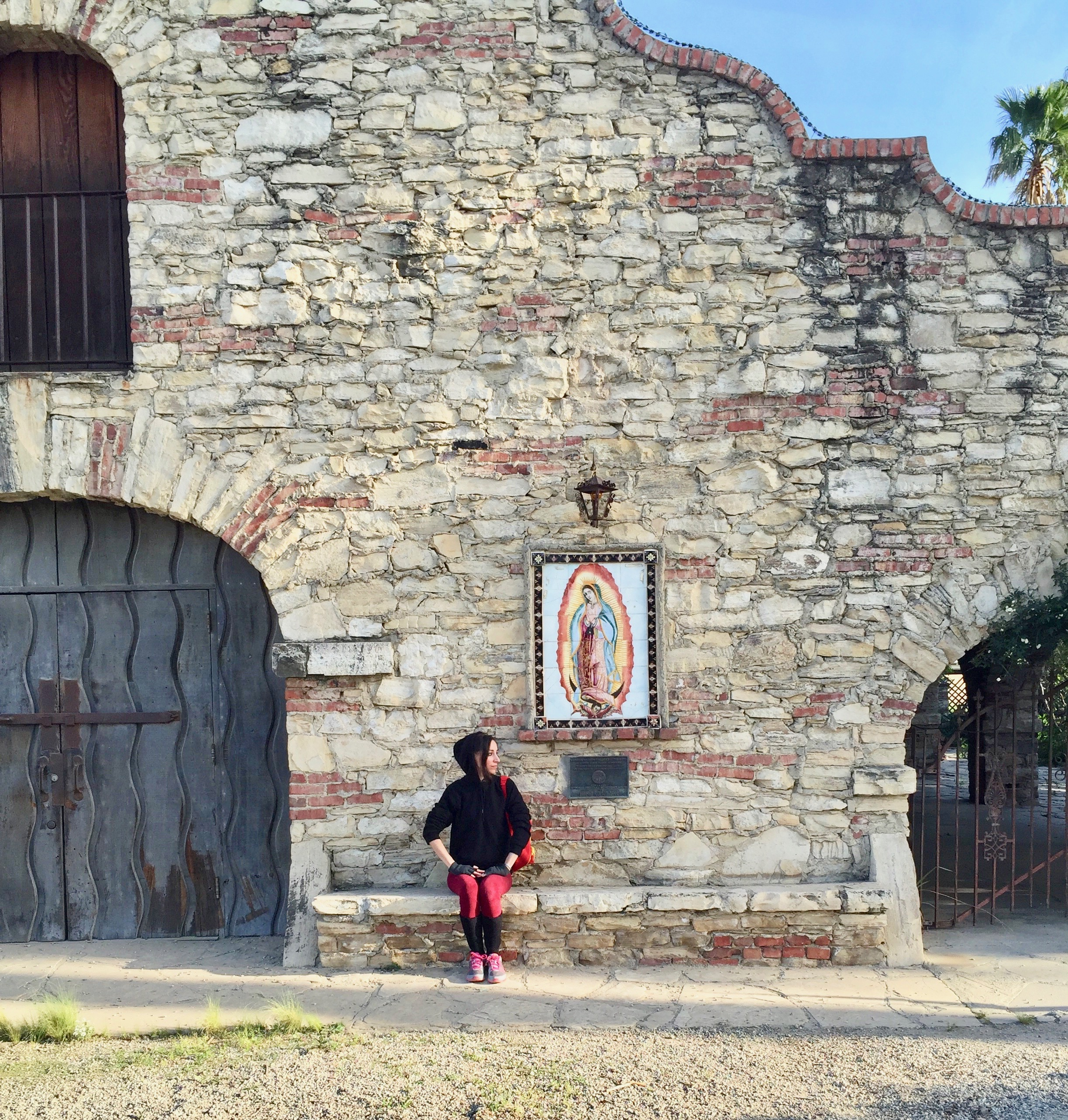

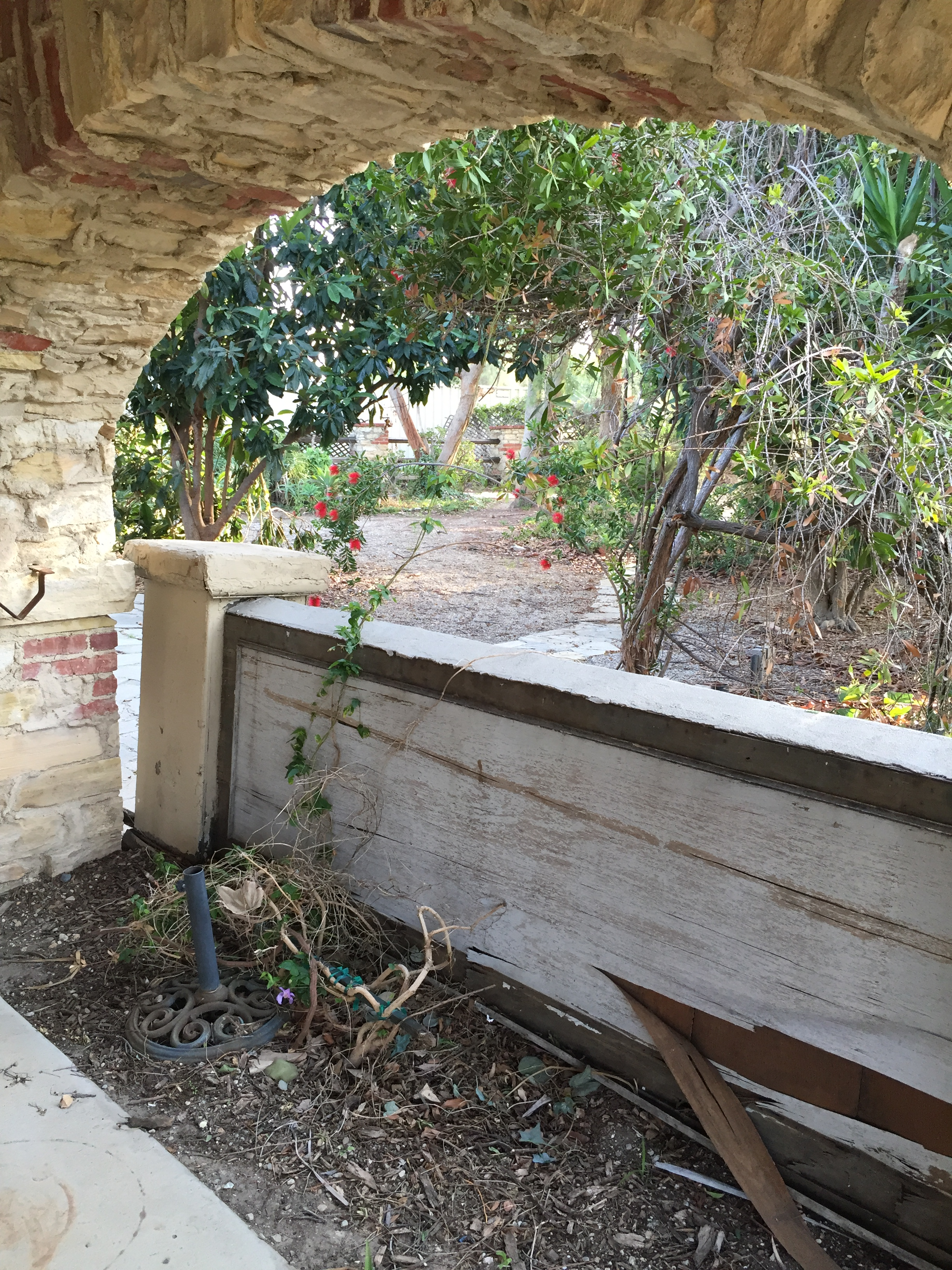

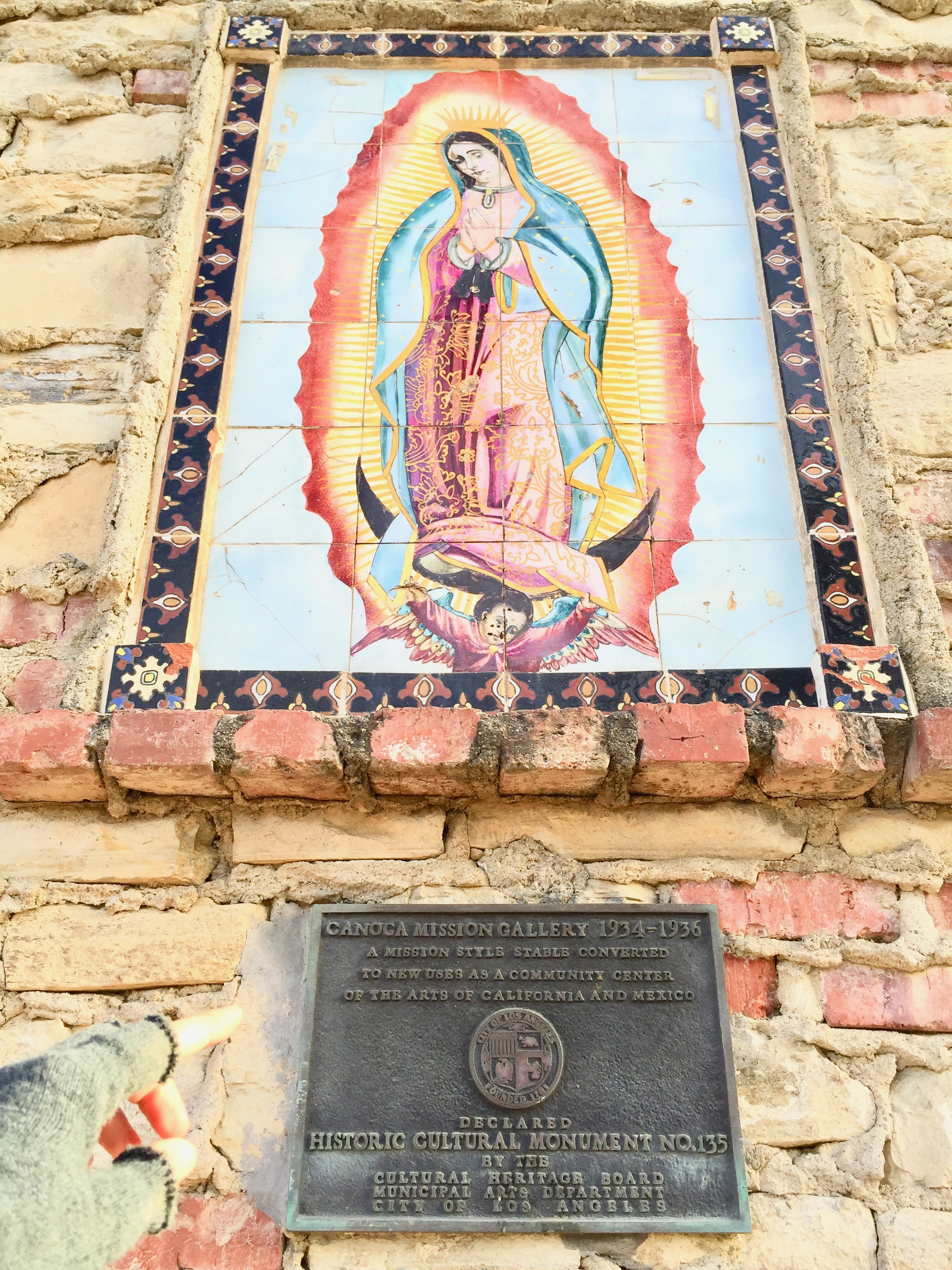
