= Avni Arbaş =

Turkish painter (1919–2003)

Turkish Cavalry of The Independence War
- Artist: Avni Arbaş
- Year: 1973
- Medium: Oil on canvas
- Dimensions: 130 cm × 162 cm (51.2 in × 63.8 in)
- Location: Eczacıbaşı Holding

Avni Arbaş (1919 – October 16, 2003) was a Turkish painter of Circassian descent.

Arbaş was born in Istanbul, in the Constantinople Vilayet of the Ottoman Empire. He is best known for his paintings of scenes from daily life in Turkey, the Turkish War of Independence, the Bosphorus, fishermen, horses, and nature. He also made many portraits.

He lived for many years in Paris and died of cancer in İzmir, Turkey in 2003. His daughter Zerrin Arbaş was notable as a beauty queen and actress and his granddaughter Derya Arbaş was also an actress.
