= Toluca Lake, Los Angeles =

Neighborhood in Los Angeles, California

Toluca Lake
- Neighborhood of Los Angeles
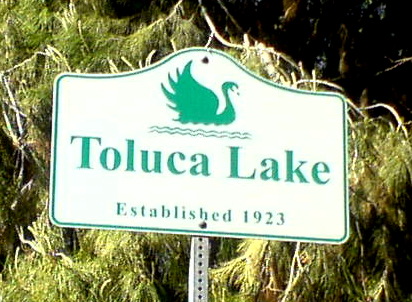
- Toluca Lake sign

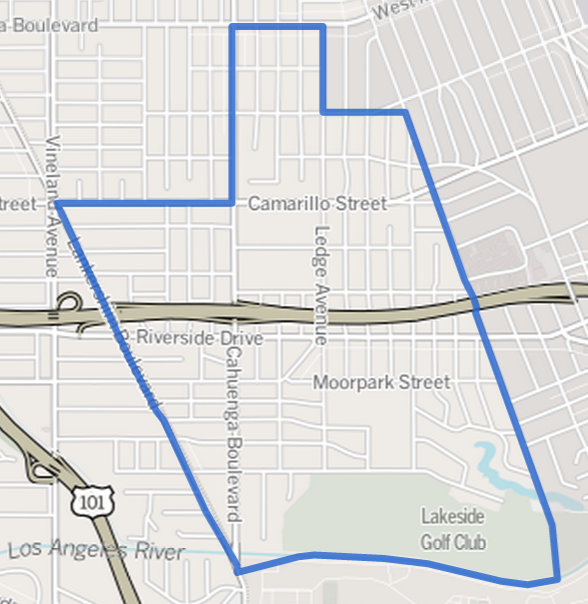
- Toluca Lake boundaries as drawn by the Los Angeles Times

- Location within the state of California
- Coordinates: 34°8′51″N 118°21′5″W
- Country: United States
- State: California
- County: Los Angeles
- City: Los Angeles and Burbank
- Established: 1923

Population (2009)
  - Total: 7,782
- Time zone: UTC−8 (Pacific (PST))
  - Summer (DST): UTC−7 (PDT)
- ZIP Code: 91602
- Area code: 818

Toluca Lake is a neighborhood in the city of Los Angeles, California, located in the San Fernando Valley 12 miles (19 km) northwest of the city’s downtown. The name is also given to a private natural lake fed by wells and maintained by neighboring property owners. Prior to the paving of the Los Angeles River in 1938 and L.A. well extraction in the late 19th and 20th century which lowered the water table, Toluca Lake was fed by artesian springs.

The history of Toluca Lake can be traced to the days of the Tongva Indians, followed by Spanish colonization and Mexican independence. Toluca Lake was part of the early rancho system. The original Toluca Lake was divided, with the neighborhood being known as Forman Toluca Ranch. In 1923, investors bought and developed the land as "Toluca Lake Park".

The neighborhood has had notable residents. Comedian Bob Hope was a longtime resident of Toluca Lake, as were Audie Murphy and Jonathan Winters. Legendary film composer Erich Wolfgang Korngold lived there from 1938 to 1957, right on the lake. Famed actress Bette Davis built a house there. Bing Crosby had a house later owned by Andy Griffith and Jerry Van Dyke. Phil Everly, Mary Astor, Roy Disney, Amelia Earhart, and Frank Sinatra also had houses there. More recently, it has been the home of entertainers such as Hilary Duff, Joseph Campanella, Steve Carell, Wayne Knight, Joe Mantegna, Andy Garcia, Richard Zanuck, Ray Romano, Rick Dees, Patricia Heaton, Melissa McCarthy, Macaulay Culkin, Denzel Washington, and Peter Bogdanovich.

== History ==
=== Early years ===
The Tongva people have lived in the San Fernando Valley and the Los Angeles Basin for 8,000 years. The Tongvan settlement Cahuenga used the springs and marsh in the Toluca Lake locale for water, fishing, hunting, harvesting, and building supplies (tule plants).

After the Spanish conquest in the 1790s of Las Californias, the San Fernando Valley, including the "Toluca Lake locale", became the extended property of the Mission San Fernando Rey de España. After the 1823 Independence of Mexico, the secularization of missions in Alta California included the issuing of a Mexican land grant for Rancho Ex-Mission San Fernando. The extreme eastern end of the lake was within the 1843 Rancho Providencia grant to Vincente de la Osa. In 1862, Pío Pico sold his share of the Ex-San Fernando Mission land, the entire southern half of the Valley below Roscoe Boulevard, to Isaac Lankershim (operating as the San Fernando Farm Homestead Association) in 1869. In 1873, Isaac Lankershim's son, James Boon Lankershim, and future son-in-law, Isaac Newton Van Nuys, took over management of the property, including the lake at Toluca. During the 1880s, the San Fernando Farm Homestead Association was succeeded by the Los Angeles Farm & Milling Company.

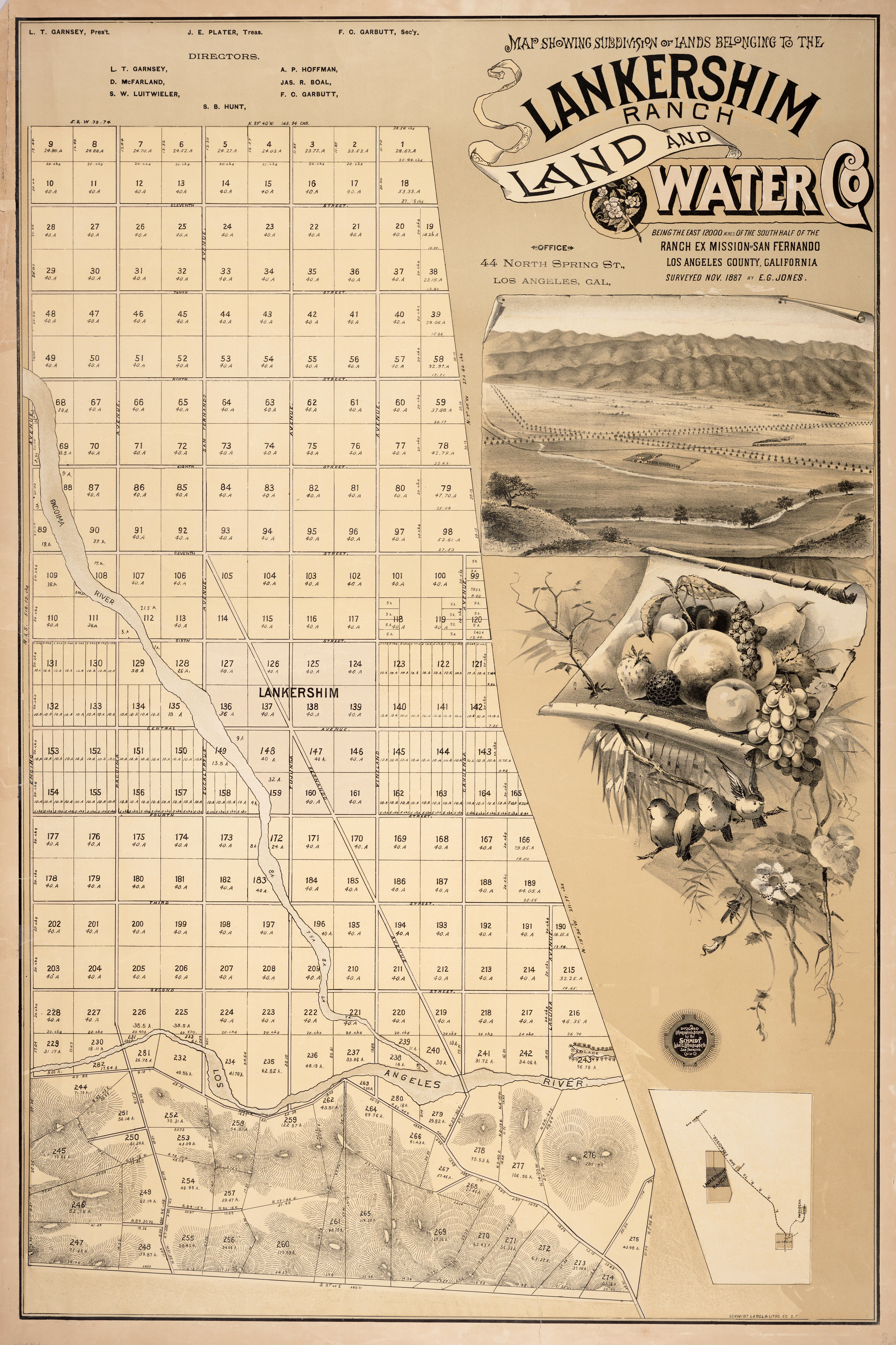
Original Toluca Lake lot parcels in the Lankershim Ranch Land and Water Company land sales of 1887

In 1893, a petition was filed with the U.S. Postal Service for the area's first post office, to be named "Toluca Post Office". General Charles Forman, a wealthy local landowner and one of the proponents of the petition, later stated that he had chosen the name "Toluca" from a Paiute word meaning "fertile" or "beautiful" valley. Though part of a larger area traditionally called "Lankershim" after a colonel of the same name—and with a Southern Pacific Railroad train station named "Lankershim" that also opened in 1893 across from the post office—Forman called his own ranch and the surrounding land "Toluca".

One of the wealthiest men in Nevada, Forman had made his fortune starting from nothing, first in mining, then cattle ranching, and then lumber. Falling in love with and marrying Los Angeles native Mary Agnes Gray, he soon moved to the area in the late 1880s and started the Kern River Company, a power company which delivered electricity from generators at the Kern River to Los Angeles. He also bought a large parcel of rich farm land, which included much of modern-day Toluca Lake and at least the western portion of the "ancient and historical" marshy pond now called Toluca Lake. By 1923, the Forman Toluca Lake Ranch was a flourishing producer of peaches, apples, and walnuts.

=== Modern development ===
In 1923, investors bought and developed the land as Toluca Lake Park. This initial venture failed, but a new group soon took over, renaming the firm as the Toluca Lake Company. With a "vision of creating a first 'bedroom community' for Los Angeles in the San Fernando Valley", the company formally changed the name of the community to simply Toluca Lake and adopted as their logo the "swan on rippled water" image associated with the community today. The name Lankershim also was considered for the town. Colonel J. B. Lankershim established the town site of Toluca at the eastern edge of the family's vast holdings in 1888. The town name was changed from Toluca to Lankershim in 1896. By 1927, the lure of Hollywood inspired local merchants to launch a campaign to change the community's name to North Hollywood. The original town site of Toluca is now part of Toluca Lake.

Newlyweds Ronald and Nancy Reagan in Toluca Lake, 1952

The Lakeside golf course was designed in 1924 by Max Behr. This attracted actor Richard Arlen, who became one of Toluca Lake's first residents, and eventually its honorary mayor.

Aviator Amelia Earhart lived in Toluca Lake on Valley Spring Lane after marrying publishing magnate George P. Putnam in 1931. The Spanish colonial-style home, which exists today, features a front-yard tree under which she signed her round-the-world flight plan. She made her home in Toluca Lake because the best aircraft were being designed and built at the Lockheed plant in Burbank.

Entertainer Bob Hope moved to Toluca Lake in the late 1930s, and lived there until his death in 2003 at the age of 100. In the 1938 Little Rascals film Three Men in a Tub, the kids hold a regatta on the lake, which was largely surrounded by open country at that time. Actors Bette Davis, W. C. Fields, Dorothy Lamour, Billie Dove, Dick Powell, and Bing Crosby also moved into the community. In 1943, Crosby's mansion was almost completely destroyed by fire. Frank Sinatra moved into the home featured player and screen icon Mary Astor built on Toluca Lake in the 1940s. Former actor and 40th President of the United States Ronald Reagan had his wedding reception with second wife Nancy Reagan at the Toluca Lake home of actor (and best man) William Holden on March 4, 1952.

Notable residents have included Steve Carell, Miley Cyrus, Viola Davis, Kirsten Dunst, Melissa McCarthy, and Octavia Spencer. In June 2018, Ron Burkle purchased the 5.2 acre Bob Hope estate for $15 million, with the proceeds going to the Bob and Dolores Hope Foundation. In 2021, Kelly Clarkson purchased an original 1936 colonial-style mansion on a Toluca Lake property.

== Geography ==
=== Community ===
The Toluca Lake neighborhood is situated on 1.22 square miles (3.2 km^{2}) of the southeastern San Fernando Valley. The Mapping L.A. section of the Los Angeles Times website describes it as bounded on the south by Universal City, on the west by Studio City, on the north by North Hollywood and on the east by the city of Burbank.

The Toluca Lake Chamber of Commerce website states that the district is not only a neighborhood in Los Angeles but that it "spills over into Burbank" and "Political entities and others, such as the Greater Toluca Lake Neighborhood Council each draw their own boundaries to suit specific needs. For example, the Toluca Lake Chamber of Commerce serves the entire community in Burbank and Los Angeles, while the City of Los Angeles considers its neighborhood called Toluca Lake to be entirely within its city boundaries".

=== Lake ===
The geologic Toluca Lake is a 6-acre (2.4 ha) body of water located near the district's southeastern boundaries. The historic natural lake was fed by springs of upwelling groundwater from the Los Angeles River and San Fernando Valley subterranean aquifers. Late 19th and 20th century L. A. DWP well extraction and 1930s concrete river channelization lowered the water table, and currently community wells at the lake's edges maintain the water level. The bottom of the lake is surfaced with four inches (102 mm) of asphalt concrete to prevent seepage. Owned by the surrounding homeowners, the lake has been maintained by the Toluca Lake Property Owners Association, a non-profit corporation established in 1934. The lake, encircled by private residences and the Lakeside Golf Club, is completely inaccessible to and hidden from the public.

=== Climate ===
Climate data for Toluca Lake, Los Angeles
Month	Jan	Feb	Mar	Apr	May	Jun	Jul	Aug	Sep	Oct	Nov	Dec	Year
Record high °F (°C)	91 (33)	89 (32)	100 (38)	106 (41)	104 (40)	115 (46)	114 (46)	113 (45)	112 (44)	107 (42)	96 (36)	90 (32)	115 (46)
Mean daily maximum °F (°C)	68 (20)	70 (21)	71 (22)	75 (24)	77 (25)	83 (28)	89 (32)	90 (32)	87 (31)	82 (28)	74 (23)	68 (20)	78 (26)
Mean daily minimum °F (°C)	43 (6)	45 (7)	47 (8)	50 (10)	54 (12)	58 (14)	61 (16)	62 (17)	60 (16)	54 (12)	47 (8)	43 (6)	52 (11)
Record low °F (°C)	20 (−7)	26 (−3)	23 (−5)	30 (−1)	35 (2)	35 (2)	45 (7)	43 (6)	42 (6)	35 (2)	29 (−2)	24 (−4)	20 (−7)
Average precipitation inches (mm)	3.61 (92)	4.18 (106)	3.64 (92)	0.91 (23)	0.33 (8.4)	0.09 (2.3)	0.02 (0.51)	0.17 (4.3)	0.29 (7.4)	0.53 (13)	1.18 (30)	2.07 (53)	17.02 (432)

== Population ==
The Toluca Lake neighborhood had a population of 7,782 in the 2000 census and an estimated population of 8,563 in 2008. At 6,393 people per square mile, its density was among the lowest in the city of Los Angeles. According to the Los Angeles Times, its percentage of white people, 71.9%, was high for the county; with black and Asian residents accounting for only 5.3% and 5% of the population, respectively. Principal ethnicities were Latino (14%), German (9.2%) and Irish (8.7%). Only 17.7% of its residents were foreign-born, a low figure compared to the city as a whole; of those, Mexico at 14.7% and the Philippines at 6.9% were the most common foreign places of birth.

The median household income level of its residents was $73,111 in 2008, and 48.4% of its residents 25 and older had a four-year degree, both of which were high for the city. The average household size was 1.9 people, low for both the city and the county. Of its housing units 62.2% were occupied by renters and 37.8% by owners.

Residents' median age was 37, which was old for the city of Los Angeles and old for the county. Only 9.7% of residents were headed by single parents, a low figure for both the city and the county.

== Politics ==
Toluca Lake is represented by the Greater Toluca Lake Neighborhood Council led by Neighborhood Council President Colby Jensen, as well as Adrin Nazarian in the Los Angeles City Council and Jesse Gabriel in the California State Assembly. NBC-4 weatherman Fritz Coleman is the honorary mayor of Toluca Lake.

In 2006, Toluca Lake homeowner groups mobilized against a proposed development in North Hollywood by NBCUniversal and Thomas Properties Group. The Metro Studio Project involves upwards of 1,000,000 square feet (93,000 m^{2}) of space and would house employees leaving NBC's Burbank facility. The project also proposes Times Square-style supergraphics and digital illuminated billboards. It would be built partly on land for which NBCUniversal has a lease agreement from the Los Angeles County Metropolitan Transportation Authority. The Los Angeles County Board of Supervisors has yet to act on the proposal, and Environmental Impact Reports are not finalized.

== Education ==
The 2000 census found that 48.4% of Toluca Lake residents within Los Angeles had earned a four-year degree, a high figure for both the city and the county. The percentage of those residents with a master's degree or higher was large for the county.

The Los Angeles section of Toluca Lake is a part of the Los Angeles Unified School District. The Burbank section is within the Burbank Unified School District.

Schools within Toluca Lake are:

- Toluca Lake Elementary School, LAUSD, 4840 Cahuenga Boulevard
- Toluca Crossroads School, private elementary, 4814 Cahuenga Boulevard

== In popular culture ==
Toluca Lake is the setting of "The Bonnie Situation" chapter in Quentin Tarantino's film Pulp Fiction (1994).

The fictional town of Silent Hill, central to the eponymous video game series, is built on the shores of a fictional body of water called Toluca Lake. It first appeared in the 1999 video game of the same name.

In the Nick Cave and the Bad Seeds's song "Higgs Boson Blues" (2013), Miley Cyrus is described as floating in a swimming pool in Toluca Lake.

== See also ==
- History of the San Fernando Valley
- Los Angeles River
- Case Study House No. 1, house in Toluca Lake on the National Register of Historic Places
