= History of the San Fernando Valley =

The history of the San Fernando Valley from its exploration by the 1769 Portola expedition to the annexation of much of it by the City of Los Angeles in 1915 is a story of booms and busts, as cattle ranching, sheep ranching, large-scale wheat farming, and fruit orchards flourished and faded. Throughout its history, settlement in the San Fernando Valley (usually called simply "The Valley") was shaped by availability of reliable water supplies and by proximity to the major transportation routes through the surrounding mountains.

== Native peoples and the coming of the Spaniards ==
=== Topography and early settlement ===
Before the flood control measures of the 20th century, the location of human settlements in the San Fernando Valley was constrained by two forces: the necessity of avoiding winter floods and need for year-round water sources to sustain communities through the dry summer and fall months. In winter, torrential downpours over the western-draining watershed of the San Gabriel Mountains entered the northeast Valley through Big Tujunga Canyon, Little Tujunga Canyon, and Pacoima Canyon. These waters spread over the Valley floor in a series of braided washes that was seven miles wide as late as the 1890s, periodically cutting new channels and reusing old ones, before sinking into the gravelly subterranean reservoir below the eastern Valley and continuing their southward journey underground. Only when the waters encountered the rocky roots of the Santa Monica Mountains were they pushed to the surface where they fed a series of tule marshes, sloughs, and the sluggish stream that is now the Los Angeles River.

By the time the Spanish conquest of Mexico reached Alta California in 1769, successive groups of indigenous peoples, or Native Americans, had inhabited the area for at least 7,000 years. These peoples tended to settle on well-watered and wooded areas at the Valley's margins. The Tongva, who spoke the Tongva language, a Uto-Aztecan or Shoshonean language, had a series of villages in the southern Valley along or near the river, including Totongna (near modern-day Calabasas), Siutcanga (near Encino; means "place of the oak" in Fernandeño) and Kawengna (which the Spanish would write as Cahuenga; it means "place of the mountain"). In the north-central Valley was an apparently permanent village called Pasakngna (Fernandeño: Paséknga, of unclear etymology), in the lower foothills of the mountains near natural springs and a tule marsh. Other characteristic place-names of Tongva origin in the Valley include Tujunga (Fernandeño: tuxunga, which means "place of the old woman") and Topanga (in Tongva, Topaa’nga, and in Fernandeño, Tupá’nga, with a root topaa’-/tupá’- that likely comes from Ventureño). The Tataviam were established in the valleys to the north; Pacoima (Fernandeño: pakoinga or pakɨynga) is believed to be of Tataviam-Fernandeño people's Tataviam language origin and means the entrance in the Fernandeño dialect.

The Hokan-speaking Chumash people inhabited Malibu, the Santa Monica Mountains, and the Simi Hills in the western area of the Valley, and much of the coastal areas to the northwest. At Bell Creek below the rocky outcropping called Escorpión Peak (Castle Peak), Chumash pictographs and other artifacts have been identified by archeologists at a site, Hu'wam, which is thought to have been a meeting place and trading center for the Tongva-Fernandeño and Chumash-Venturaño. In the Simi Hills the Burro Flats Painted Cave pictographs are located on Rocketdyne's Santa Susana Field Laboratory property, inaccessible but well protected. The Tataviam-Fernandeño people inhabited the foothills of the Santa Susana Mountains in the Valley (and north in the Santa Clara River area). The Tongva-Fernandeño inhabited the Valley, along the tributaries to the Los Angeles River.

=== Exploration ===
In 1769, the expedition led by explorer Gaspar de Portolà reached the Los Angeles area of California overland from Baja California. Accompanying him were two Franciscan Padres, Junípero Serra and Juan Crespí, who recorded the expedition and identified locations for a proposed network of missions, along which the royal highway (El Camino Real) was eventually built.

After camping at and naming the location that would become the Pueblo de Los Angeles, the expedition proceeded westward before turning north through the Sepulveda Pass over the Santa Monica Mountains on the feast day of Saint Catherine of Bologna.

We saw a very pleasant and spacious valley. We descended to it and stopped close to a watering place, which is a large pool. Near it we found a village of heathen, very friendly and docile. We gave to this plain the name of Santa Catalina de Bononia de Los Encinos. It has on its hills and its valleys many live oak and walnuts.

— Father Juan Crespi, August, 1769

The watering place was a pool fed by a perennial spring at what is now Encino, near the village of Siutangna. The name El Valle de Santa Catalina de Bononia de los Encinos refers to the encinos or evergreen Coast Live Oaks that studded the area. The expedition proceeded northward, camping at a site in the northern Valley before crossing over the mountains into the Santa Clarita Valley.

Father Crespí had identified a location along the Los Angeles River that would be perfect for a settlement, possibly a mission, but in 1781, King Charles III of Spain ordered that a pueblo be built on the site, which would be the second town in Alta California after San José de Guadalupe, founded in 1777. By royal edict, all of the waters of the river and its tributaries were reserved for the Pueblo de Los Angeles, a condition which would have a profound impact on development of the Valley.

=== Mission San Fernando ===
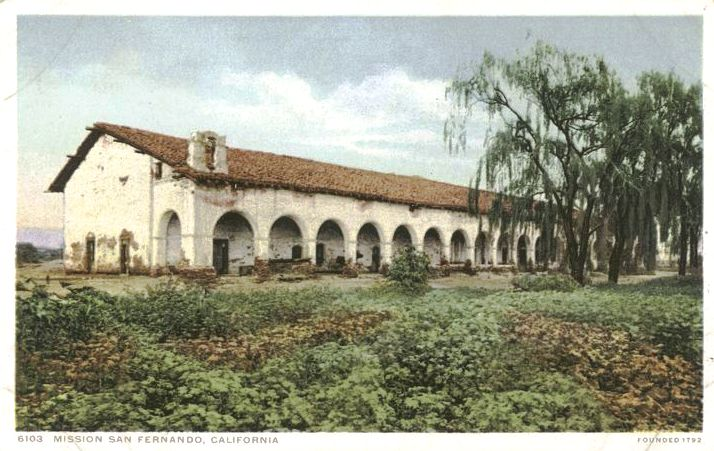
Mission San Fernando c. 1900

By the end of the century, Spain had issued two grazing concessions north of the pueblo that included the southeastern corner of the Valley, Rancho San Rafael and Rancho Portesuelo. Francisco Reyes, alcalde or mayor of Los Angeles from 1793 to 1795, had set up a grazing operation which he called Rancho Encino located in what is now Mission Hills near the village of Pasakngna. Reyes's property had a substantial water supply from artesian wells and limestone for building, and was situated a day's walk from the existing missions San Gabriel and San Buenaventura. In or shortly before 1797 he was persuaded to cede this land to the Franciscans to be the site of a new mission, receiving in exchange a square league (4,460 acres (18 km^{2})) of land in the southern valley by the perennial spring where the Portola Expedition had first entered the Valley. This property he also called Rancho Encino (also recorded as El Encino and Los Encinos).

Mission San Fernando Rey de España was founded at Reyes's original rancho site on September 8, 1797, by Father Fermín Lasuén. The mission's grazing lands extended over the flatlands of the valley, and it also claimed jurisdiction over several smaller valleys to the north and west. From this time, the valley began to be called after the mission.

The fathers were charged with "civilizing" the native peoples, which they named according to the mission which had jurisdiction over them. The native peoples associated with Mission San Fernando were called Fernandeños regardless of tribal affiliation or language, as those associated with Mission San Gabriel were called Gabrielinos. As the 19th century dawned, 541 Indians did the heavy work of the Mission San Fernando, tending the livestock and working the farmlands watered by irrigation from the mission's wells. The mission was famed for its red wine, and also grew pomegranates, figs and olives. By 1826, 56,000 longhorn cattle and 1,500 horses grazed on the mission lands of the valley floor.

== Mexican rule ==
=== Ranchos ===
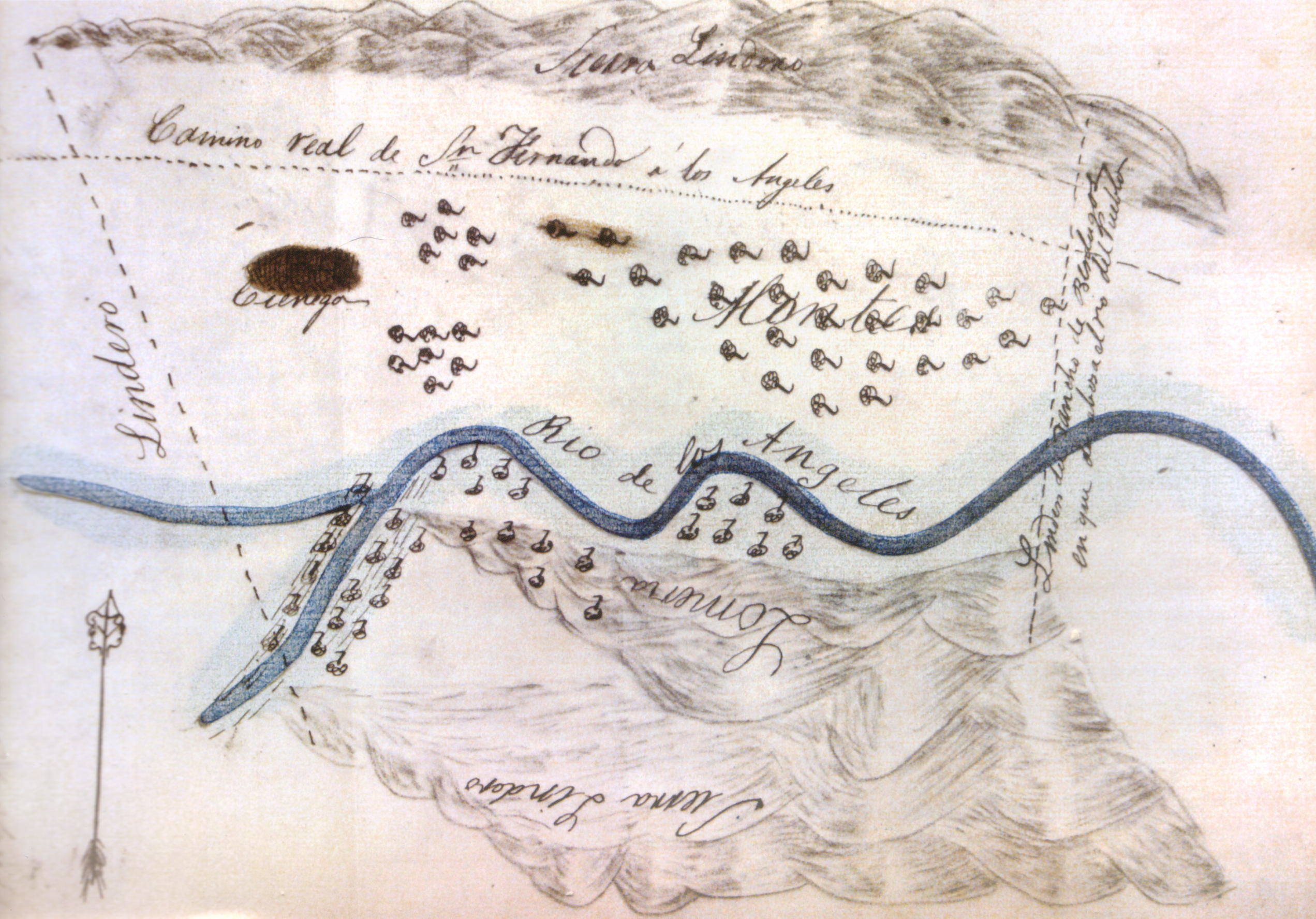
Sketch map or diseño of the Scott Tract of Rancho Rafael in modern Burbank, 1870s.

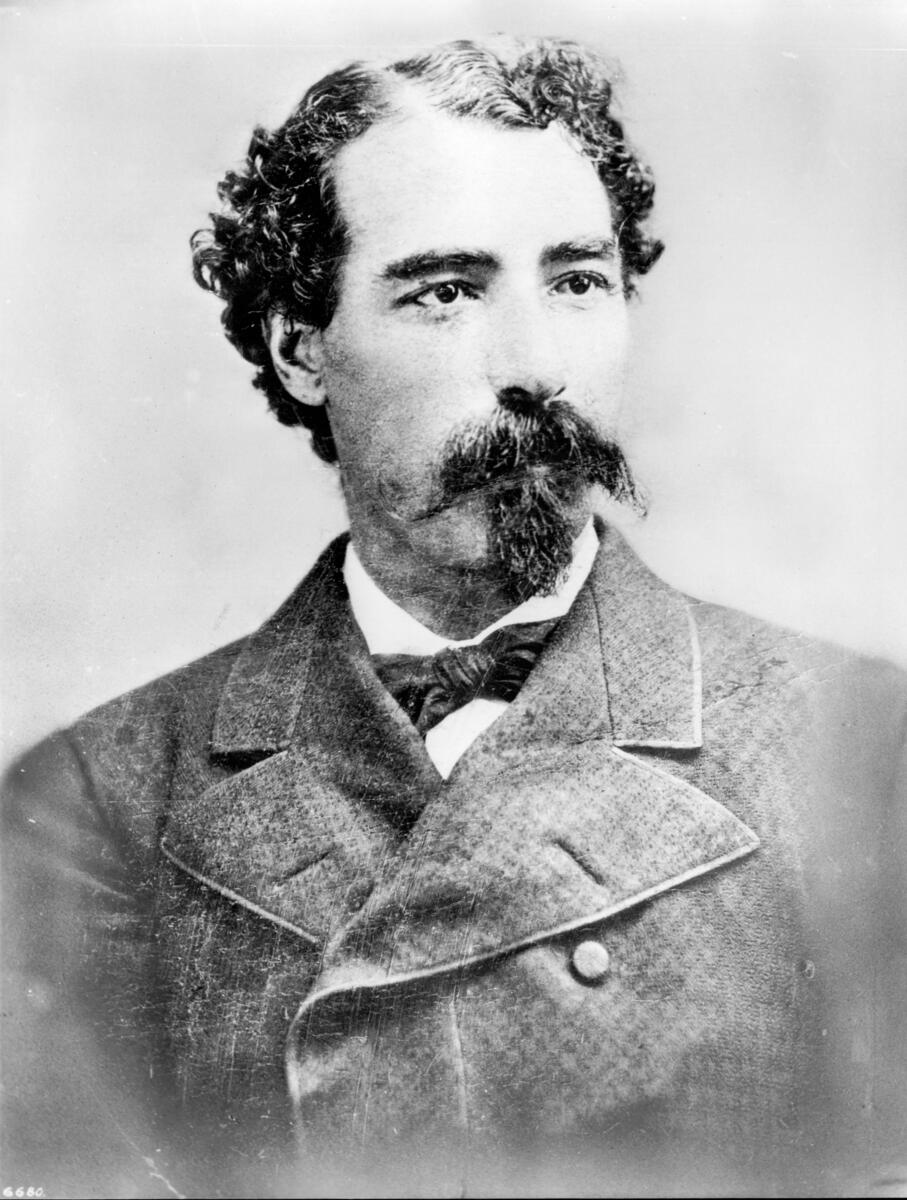
Californio ranchero Eulogio F. de Celis owned most of the San Fernando Valley.

In 1821, Mexico achieved its independence from Spain, and California came under control of the Mexican government. The 1824 Mexican Colony Law established rules for petitioning for land grants to individuals in California. Regulations enacted in 1828 attempted to break the monopoly of the missions and also made land grants easier to obtain. The procedure included a diseño - a hand drawn sketch map. The Mexican Governors of Alta California gained the power to grant state lands, and many of the earlier Spanish grazing concessions were subsequently patented under Mexican law.

Many Californios in the Los Angeles area wanted the mission's rich grazing lands to be made available to private citizens, while those in the north, including Mexican governor General Manuel Victoria, preferred to keep the mission system intact. Late in 1831, the Californios rose in armed rebellion against the governor, who led a party of soldiers to the Valley to put down the rebellion. The southern ranchers rode into the Valley via the Cahuenga Pass and the two armies faced off in a skirmish (Battle of Cahuenga Pass) that left one man dead on either side. Although the rebels retreated to the pueblo, they were victorious in defeat; the wounded governor resigned and returned to Mexico. Popular pressure increased on the government to disestablish the missions, and laws were passed to secularize the missions on August 17, 1833.

In 1843, Don Vicente de la Osa (or del la Ossa) was granted one league of land along the Los Angeles River at the southeast corner of the Valley which he named Rancho Providencia. The nearby Battle of Providencia of February 20, 1845, was another face-off between Californios and an unpopular Mexican governor, Manuel Micheltorena, who proposed to return the mission lands to the control of the church. The only reported fatalities in the day-long cannon battle along the river were two horses and a mule, but Governor Micheltorena was captured and summarily shipped back to Mexico. He was replaced by Pío Pico, a native Californio, who would become the last Mexican governor of California.

=== Mexican–American War ===
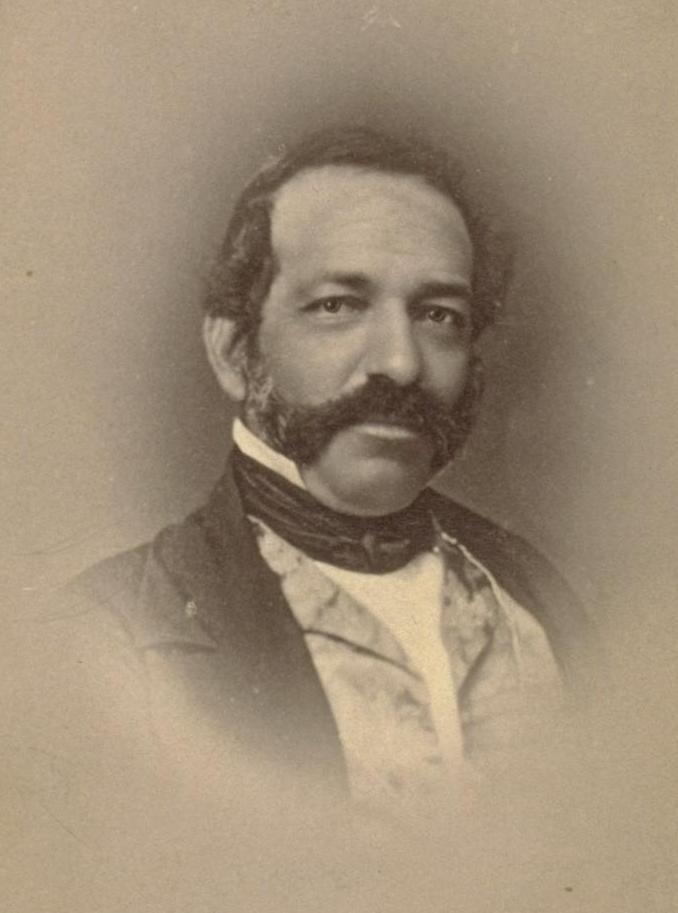
Don Andrés Pico

California was "land rich but poor in every other way, lacking cash, gunpowder, and support from Mexico." Governor Pico prepared for the inevitable war with the United States, and in 1845 began dispersing the vast mission lands. A square of land at the west end of the Valley near the historic Chumash village Hu'wam was granted to three of the mission Indians under the name Rancho El Escorpión. The majority of the mission's grazing lands and mission buildings were leased to the governor's brother Andrés Pico. After the United States declared war on Mexico on May 13, 1846, Pico sold the mission property outright to Eulogio de Celis for much-needed cash; Celis graciously extended the terms of his friend Andrés Pico's lease. From this time the property was known as Rancho Ex-Mission San Fernando.

United States troops quickly took control of the presidios at Monterey and San Francisco and proclaimed the Conquest complete. In Southern California, the Mexicans, for a time, resisted American troops, but when defeat became inevitable, Pío Pico fled to Mexico. Don Andrés Pico arranged the peaceful surrender of Los Angeles to American forces under Lieutenant-Colonel John C. Frémont. The Treaty of Cahuenga ending the hostilities in California was signed at an adobe owned by the Verdugo Family at Campo de Cahuenga near the mouth of the Cahuenga Pass, at the southeast corner of the Valley, on January 13, 1847.

The Treaty of Guadalupe Hidalgo in 1848, ended the war and ceded California to the United States.

== Gold Rush and statehood ==
=== Cattle boom ===
In Northern California the California Gold Rush starting in 1849 created an influx of over a hundred thousand prospectors and a heavy demand for beef from southern California. Herds of cattle were driven to northern markets serving the gold fields. In the southern Valley, de la Osa sold Rancho La Providencia to David W. Alexander and acquired the Rancho Encino, successfully raising cattle on the property. De la Osa took formal title to the Rancho under California law in 1851. Andrés Pico returned to his rancho in the Valley and made the former mission into "one of the most celebrated homes in the new California." After California became a state on September 9, 1850, Pico served as a state assemblyman and senator, and became a brigadier general in the state militia. In 1854, Andrés Pico's nine-year lease on the Rancho Ex-Mission San Fernando expired, and he purchased a half-interest in the property.

=== Stage stops and the overland mail ===
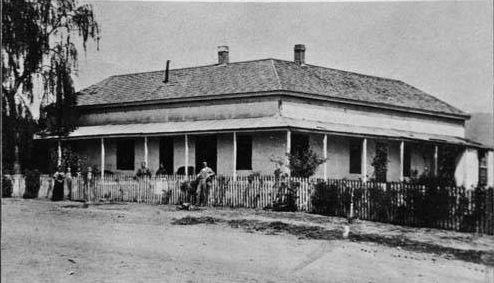
Lopez Station in the 1860s.

In 1851 the Los Angeles Court of Sessions recognized two rights of way through the Cahuenga Pass that connected Los Angeles with the Valley. One followed the old El Camino Real to Santa Barbara via Rancho Encino. The other, Tulare Road, joined El Camino Viejo ("the old road") north via Mission San Fernando, over the San Fernando Pass (now the Newhall Pass) to the Santa Clarita Valley, and through the Old Tejon Pass to the Central Valley and the gold fields beyond. In 1854, the Army established Fort Tejon in the Grapevine Canyon (La Cañada de las Uvas) near Fort Tejon Pass. The Los Angeles County Board of Supervisors authorized funds to construct a 30-foot (9.1 m) deep cut to make the steep route north over the San Fernando Pass easier for stagecoach traffic, and a group of businessmen raised funds by subscription to complete the work. Young entrepreneur Phineas Banning's staging and shipping partnership with County Supervisor David W. Alexander acquired the contract to supply Fort Tejon, and Banning drove the first stage run over the new cut in December 1854. Also the U. S. Army Pacific Railroad Surveys found the Fort Tejon Pass a much easier route for wagons than the old Tejon Pass, and this route became the Stockton - Los Angeles Road, the new wagon route to the southern goldfields on the Kern River and northward on the east side of the San Joaquin Valley to Stockton.

The Butterfield Overland Mail stagecoach route between St. Louis, Missouri and San Francisco, California via Fort Yuma and Los Angeles made its first run in the fall of 1858. The original route entered the Valley through Cahuenga Pass and traveled northwest to the San Fernando Pass with a stage stop at Lopez Station north of the mission.

In 1859, the California Legislature appropriated $15,000 (with additional funding provided by Los Angeles and Santa Barbara Counties) towards improving the old Santa Susana Pass wagon road into a new stagecoach road, now known as the Old Santa Susana Stage Road. The road ran over the Simi Hills between Santa Susana (now Chatsworth) and the Simi Valley. The precipitous portion of the route down from the summit on the San Fernando Valley side was called the Devil's Slide; horses were usually blindfolded and chains were used to augment brakes on the steep descent. Passengers debarked and walked.

Southern California's boom market in beef had begun to decline as early as 1855. A drought in 1856 increased the pressure on the ranchos. By 1859, with the cattle market in collapse and besieged by mounting debts, De la Osa converted his house at Rancho Encino into a roadside inn and began to charge patrons for his legendary Californio hospitality.

The outbreak of the Civil War in 1861 disrupted mail service to California from the east via the old southerly "oxbow route". That year, Butterfield obtained a new contract to deliver mail between Los Angeles and San Francisco via a route diverging from the old road at the southeast corner of the Valley and traveling via the former El Camino Real as far as Rancho Encino before striking northwest across the valley floor for Santa Barbara via the recently improved Santa Susana wagon road over the Santa Susana Pass. This road became the main passenger route between Los Angeles and San Francisco, although traffic over the San Fernando Pass to the Central Valley continued.

=== Civil War years ===
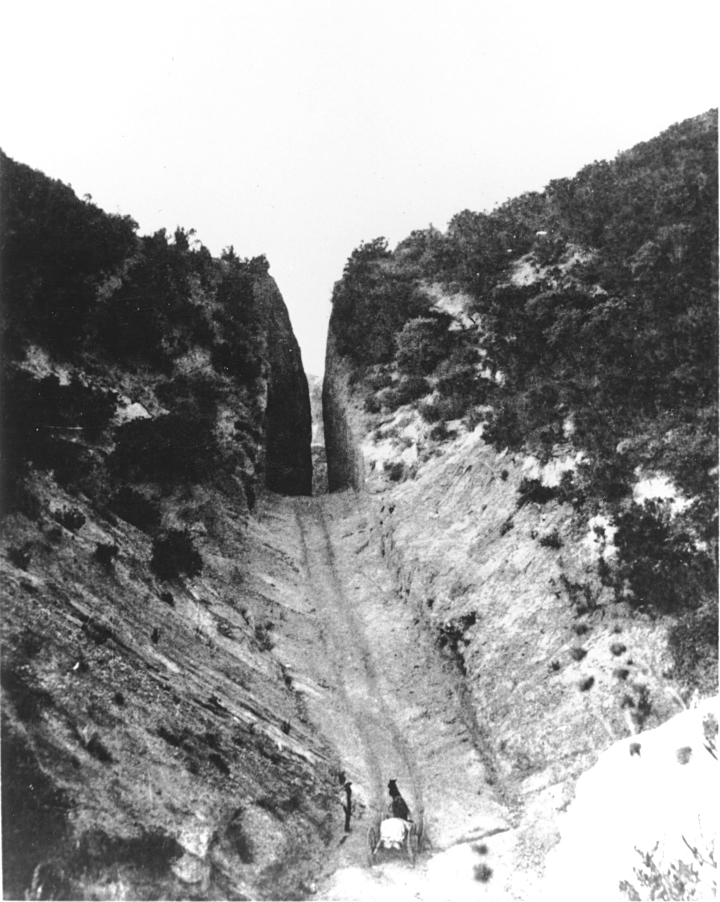
Beale's Cut through the San Fernando Pass, c.1872

The devastation that ravaged the old rancho way of life between 1861 and 1865 had little to do with the Civil War raging to the east. The rains that started shortly before Christmas, 1861, continued for most of the following month. The flooding that followed drowned thousands of cattle and washed away fruit trees and vineyards. The Los Angeles Star reported that

The road from Tejon, we hear, has been almost washed away. The San Fernando mountain cannot be crossed except by the old trail ... over the top of the mountain. The plain has been cut up into gulches and arroyos, and streams are rushing down every declivity.

No mail was received at Los Angeles for five weeks. After the floods abated, grazing lands were turned into lush meadows and cattle flourished on the abundant grass. Surveyor General Edward Fitzgerald Beale had the damaged cut in the San Fernando Pass deepened to 90 feet (27.4 m) and named the slot-like roadway Beale's Cut. But the reprieve was only brief.

The flood of 1861–62 was followed by severe droughts in 1863 and 1864. Cattle perished, or were slaughtered and sold for the salvage value of their hides and horn, and land values plummeted. Ravenous locusts and a major smallpox epidemic completed the devastation. The rancho economy of the Dons and the Californio way of life fell to a wave of overwhelming debt and unpaid taxes, never to rise again.

== After the Dons ==
=== New names on the land ===
In the decade after the Civil War, the majority of the old ranchos in the Valley changed hands. In 1867, David Burbank, a dentist and entrepreneur from Los Angeles, purchased Rancho Providencia and 4,607 acres (19 km^{2}) of the adjacent Rancho San Rafael. Burbank combined his properties into a nearly 9,000-acre (36 km^{2}) sheep ranch.

That same year, De La Osa's widow sold Rancho Encino to James Thompson, who raised sheep on the rancho for two years. Thompson in turn sold the property to the Garnier brothers in 1869. The Garniers also raised sheep on the property, and were known for the fine quality of their fleece, but they in turn became overextended and lost the property to foreclosure in 1878.

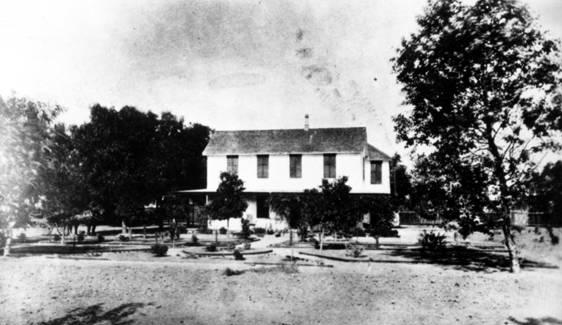
Home of Isaac Van Nuys, 1882

Eulogio de Celis had tried to sell his vast holdings in the Valley, but found no buyers. Squeezed by debt after the flood years, Andrés Pico had sold his half-interest in the Rancho ex-Mission San Fernando to his brother Pío Pico in 1862, retaining 2,000 acres (8 km^{2}) called the Pico Reserve around the old Mission. When De Celis died in 1869, Pío Pico, desperately in need of cash, sold his half-share to a group of investors assembled as the San Fernando Farm Homestead Association. The leading investor was Isaac Lankershim, a Northern California stockman and grain farmer, who was impressed by the Valley's wild oats and proposed to raise sheep on the property. Other investors included Levi Strauss. To complete the sale, the Valley was split lengthwise, with the Association purchasing the southern half and the northern half devolving to De Celis's heirs. The line of demarcation was a ploughed furrow across the Valley floor near the route of today's Roscoe Boulevard. In 1873, Isaac Lankershim's son and future son-in-law, James Boon Lankershim and Isaac Newton Van Nuys, moved to the Valley and took over management of the property. Van Nuys built the first wood-frame house in the Valley. Initially, the two men raised sheep, changing the name of the company to the San Fernando Sheep Company. Van Nuys, however, thought the property could profitably grow wheat using the dryland farming technique developed on the Great Plains, and leased land from the Association to test his theories. After a drought destroyed the majority of the sheep in 1875, the remainder of the property was given over to raising wheat and barley. In time, the Lankershim property, under its third name, the Los Angeles Farming and Milling Company, would become the world's largest wheat-growing empire.

=== Railroads and boom towns ===
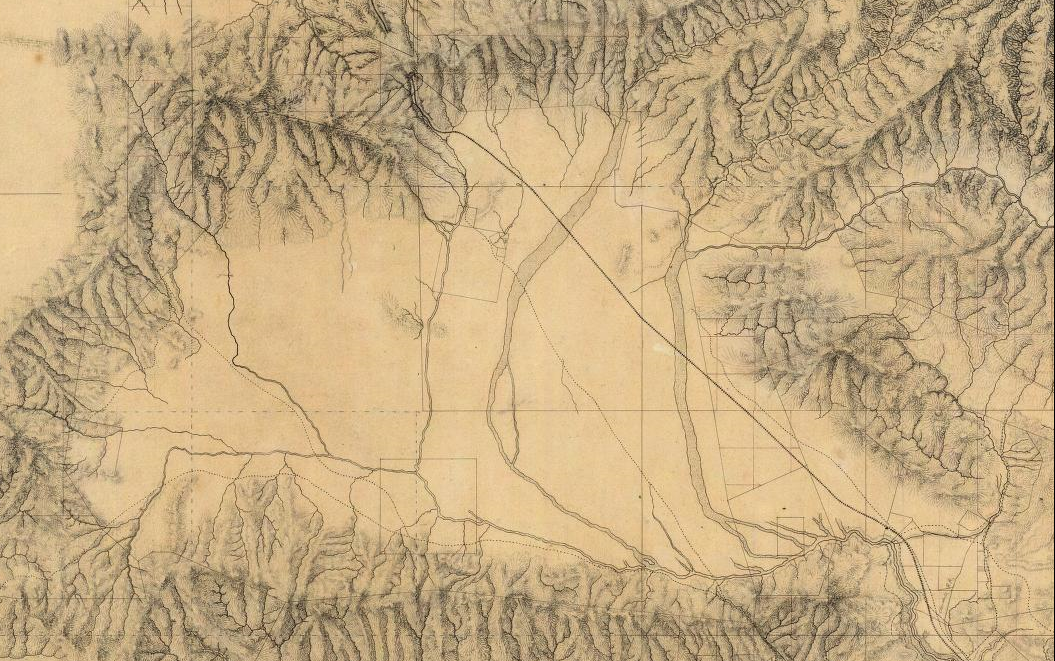
Map of the San Fernando Valley in 1880 by William Hammond Hall.

A 56,000-acre (227 km^{2}) parcel of De Celis's property north of the great furrow was purchased in 1874 by state senator Charles Maclay of Santa Clara and his partner, George K. Porter of San Francisco. Porter's cousin Benjamin F. Porter subsequently purchased portions of Porter and Maclay's interests. Most of the land except the parcel northeast of the mission was used for wheat farming. Ben Porter's portion to the west (now Porter Ranch) remained one of the last parts of the Valley to be developed.

In the eastern section nearest the San Gabriel Mountains, Maclay platted the Valley's first town, San Fernando, on September 15, 1874. The town plan included land for a station for Leland Stanford's Southern Pacific Railroad from Los Angeles, which became the depot for the north Valley farmers to ship their wheat crops south to the port at Wilmington. In 1876, Southern Pacific opened a tunnel through the pass at San Fernando and ran the first through train from the transcontinental railroad's western terminus in San Francisco to Los Angeles. From this time, rail travel superseded long-distance travel by stagecoach in California.

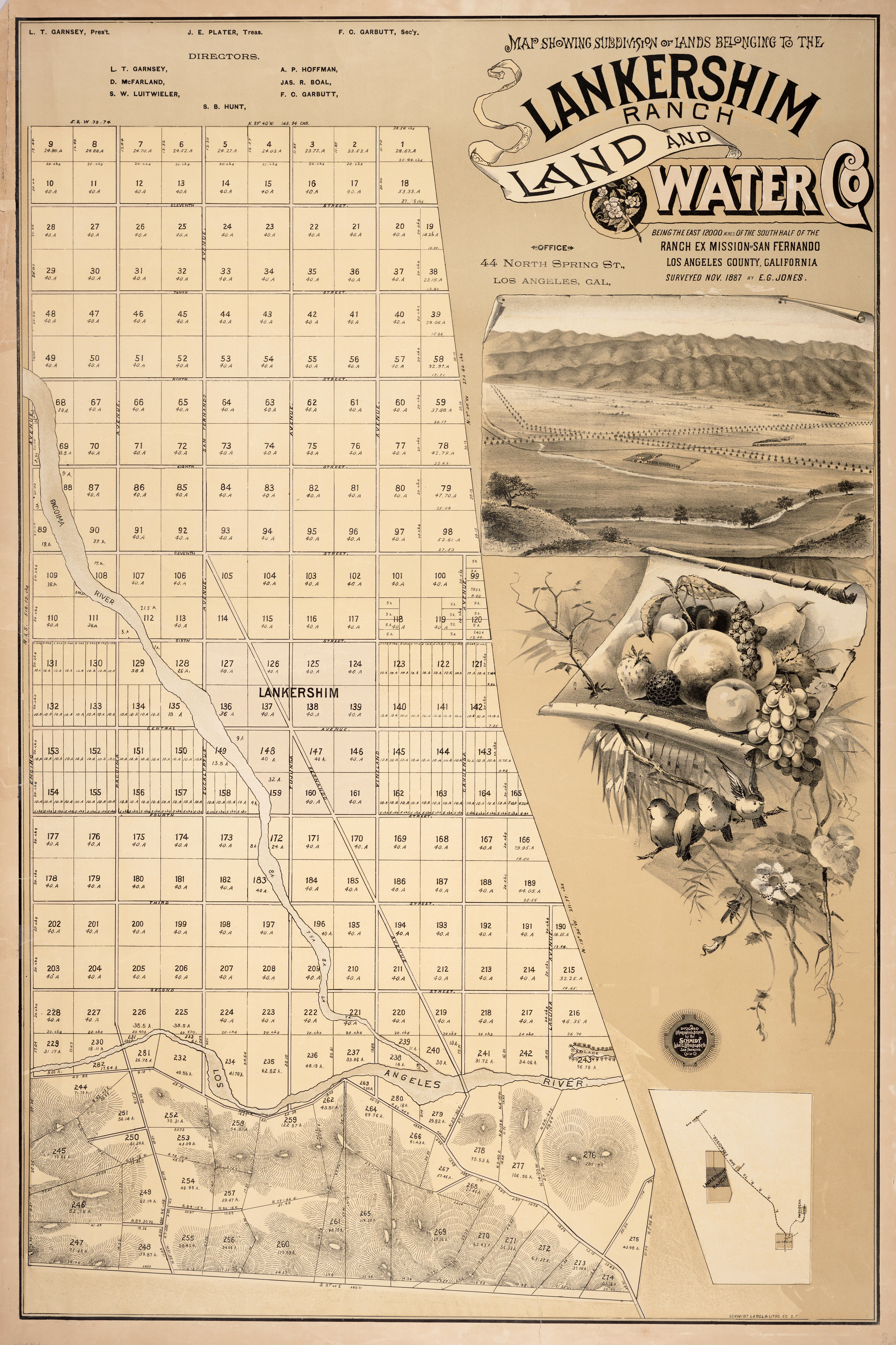
Map of the Lankershim Ranch properties, 1887

The world wheat market remained strong through the 1870s and early 1880s, but then supply began to exceed demand, and prices began to fall. When the rival Santa Fe Railroad reached Los Angeles in 1885, fare wars between the two transportation giants brought ever more settlers to Southern California, and pressure rose to subdivide the great ranches of the Valley. In 1886, David Burbank sold his ranch to Los Angeles land speculators who formed the Providencia Land, Water and Development Company, with Burbank as one of the directors. The land was surveyed and a business district was laid out, surrounded by residential lots. The outlying area was divided into small farms. They named the town Burbank and opened the tract for sale on May 1, 1887.

In October 1887, J. B. Lankershim and eight other developers organized the Lankershim Ranch Land and Water Company, purchasing 12,000 acres (49 km^{2}) north of the Caheunga Pass from the Lankershim Farming and Milling Company. Lankershim established a townsite which the residents named Toluca (later Lankershim, and now North Hollywood) along the old Tulare Road from Cahuenga Pass to San Fernando. On April 1, 1888, they offered ready-made small farms for sale, already planted with deep-rooted deciduous fruit and nut trees—mostly peaches, pears, and walnuts—that could survive the rainless summers of the Valley by relying on the high water table along the Pacoima River (now the central or main branch of the Tujunga Wash) rather than surface irrigation.

In 1888, Ben Porter sold a portion of his property near the base of Santa Susana Pass to the Porter Land and Water Company, which platted it as the community of Chatsworth Park.

The land boom of the 1880s went bust by the 1890s, but despite another brutal drought cycle in the late 1890s, the fruit and nut farmers remained solvent for a time. The Toluca Fruit Growers Association was formed in 1894. The next year the Southern Pacific opened a branch line slanting northwest across the Valley to Chatsworth Park, which made one freight stop a day at Toluca, though the depot bore the new name of Lankershim. In 1896, under pressure from J. B. Lankershim, the post office at Toluca was renamed "Lankershim" after his father, although the new name of the town would not be officially recognized until 1905.

A new Santa Susana Pass wagon route bypassing the deteriorating Devil's Slide was opened in 1895 to the north. Initially called El Camino Nuevo (the New Road), it was later named the Chatsworth Grade Road, which continued in use until Santa Susana Pass Road (now Old Santa Susana Pass Road) was built in 1917. This was the first automobile route between the San Fernando and Simi Valleys. It also was the main northbound 'coast road' to Santa Barbara and San Francisco, until the Conejo Grade in Ventura County between Conejo Valley and the Oxnard Plain on "Camino Real Viejo" (the Old Royal Road, now U.S. Route 101), was improved. Rail traffic through Toluca and Chatsworth Park to Ventura County and points north was made possible by the opening of the Santa Susana Tunnels in 1904, and the new coast route soon superseded the old rail route to San Francisco via the San Fernando Pass for passenger travel, as that route had superseded the stagecoach route via Santa Susana Pass in the 1870s.

Late in the decade the City of Los Angeles sued all the ranchers of the Valley, claiming the rights not only to the surface water of the Los Angeles River and its tributaries, but to the groundwater as well. In 1899, the California Supreme Court sided with the city. Without a reliable water supply, it became impossible to sell farm sites in the Valley.

== The 20th century ==
=== Development in the new century ===
In October 1903, George K. Porter sold an option to purchase his last 16,200 acres (66 km^{2}) of land in the north Valley to a syndicate led by Leslie C. Brand of Glendale. In 1904, Brand's syndicate incorporated as the San Fernando Mission Land Company, whose major shareholders included Los Angeles businessmen Henry E. Huntington, E.H. Harriman, Edwin T. Earl, Joseph F. Sartori, and Harrison Gray Otis. One day after the city water commission, on which Moses Sherman sat, approved a proposal to build an aqueduct from the Owens Valley, the Company quietly exercised its option to purchase Porter's land.

On July 29, 1905, the city announced its plans to bring water south from the Owens Valley—water that would only be made available to city residents. Construction began in 1908 and water from the Los Angeles Aqueduct reached the San Fernando Valley in November, 1913.

Real estate development once again boomed. In the "biggest land transaction ever recorded in Los Angeles County", a syndicate led by Harry Chandler, business manager of the Los Angeles Times, with Hobart Johnstone Whitley, Isaac Van Nuys, and James Boon Lankershim acquired "Tract 1000", the remaining 47,500 acres (192 km^{2}) of the southern half of the former Mission lands—everything west of the Lankershim town limits and south of the old furrow excepting the Rancho Encino. As the Los Angeles Suburban Homes company, they laid out plans for the towns of Van Nuys, Marion (now Reseda) and Owensmouth (now Canoga Park, West Hills, and Winnetka), a system of highways, and eventual incorporation into the city of Los Angeles. In the "Sale of the Century" in November 1910 they sold the remaining livestock and non-land assets of the Lankershim Farming and Milling Company at auction. The Los Angeles Times called the auction "the beginning of a new empire and a new era in the Southland".

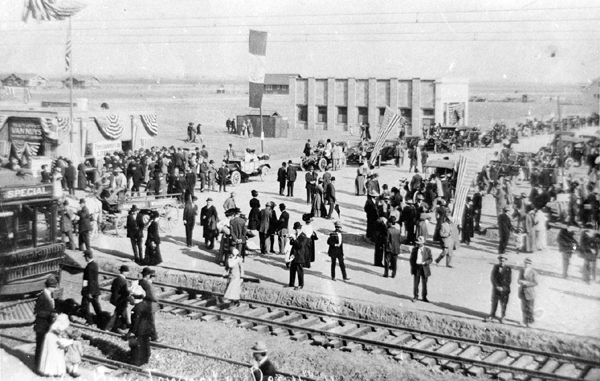
Van Nuys after the arrival of the Pacific Electric Railway 1911

The City of Burbank was incorporated in 1911, and the Pacific Electric Railway reached Van Nuys on December 16, 1911, Owensmouth on December 7, 1912, and San Fernando on March 22, 1913. In 1912, Carl Laemmle broke ground on a permanent movie-making facility on the Providencia (Oak Crest Ranch) in the hills east of the mouth of the Cahuenga Pass that would become the first location of Universal City. Universal City moved to a new location, the Taylor Ranch in 1914. In 1914, Carl Laemmle broke ground on Taylor ranch for the New Universal City in the hills east of the mouth of the Cahuenga Pass that would become the second location of Universal City in the San Fernando Valley, Universal City.

=== Annexation ===
Valley farmers offered to buy the surplus aqueduct water, but the federal legislation that enabled the construction of the aqueduct prohibited Los Angeles from selling the water outside of the city limits. For the Valley communities, the choice was consent to annexation or do without. On March 29, 1915, by a vote of 681 to 25, residents of 108,732 acres (440 km^{2}) of the San Fernando Valley (excluding Rancho El Escorpión and the communities of Owensmouth, Lankershim, Burbank and San Fernando) voted to be annexed by the City of Los Angeles. Owensmouth was annexed in 1917, West Lankershim in 1919, Chatsworth in 1920, and Lankershim in 1923. Small remote portions of the north and west Valley were annexed piecemeal even later: most of Rancho El Escorpión in 1958 and the remainder of Ben Porter's ranch as late as 1965. Burbank and San Fernando remain independent cities to this day.

== References: San Fernando Valley Movie Making 1912 to 1915 ==
- Rancho Providencia First Movie Town 1912
- Providencia Ranch Oak Crest - Universal/Bison 101 Movies
- Nestor Studios valley ranch
- Universal City the two valley ranch locations
- Forest Lawn Memorial Park (Hollywood Hills) Movie location

Other references'

1. "San Fernando Valley" By Marc Wanamaker (2011) Page 97, 103, and 106
2. "Oak Crest, a film city by itself" The New York Dramatic Mirror - January 15, 1913 page 49.
3. "Universal City Visit" Rotarian February 1914
4. "Early Universal City"; by Robert S. Birchard
5. "A Motion Picture City ..." Daily Advocate, October 2, 1914, Page 6
6. "Scrap it" the Old Universal - 1915 Universal Tour Brochure
7. The Cowboys, Indians and zoo 1914 first assets to be moved to the new Universal City. [Motion Picture World]
8. "The Theatre of Science; a volume of progress and achievement in the motion picture industry" by Robert Grau : Page 287 - 1914 Broadway Pub. Co. New York
9. The Life & Adventures of Carl Laemmle; by John Drinkwater (Carl Laemmle views Nestor ranch and names the area Universal City))
10. "Quiet on the Set" - Iverson Movie Ranch History 1984

Universal History 1912 to 1915– "Frickr Universal Image collection" by Dennis Dickens.

== See also ==
- Bibliography of California history
- Bibliography of Los Angeles
- Outline of the history of Los Angeles
- Ranchos of California
- History of Los Angeles
- List of Los Angeles Historic-Cultural Monuments in the San Fernando Valley
- California Water Wars

== Bibliography ==
- Bearchell, Charles A.; Fried, Larry D. (1988). The San Fernando Valley: Then and Now: An Illustrated History (1st ed.). Northridge, California: Windsor Publications. ISBN 0-89781-285-9. OCLC 18350426.
- Beck, Warren A; Haase, Ynez D. (1974). Historical Atlas of California (1st ed.). University of Oklahoma Press. ISBN 0-8061-1212-3. OCLC 947893.
- Bevill, Arthur D. (2007). Santa Susana Pass State Historic Park Cultural Resource Survey - Historic Overview (PDF). Archived from the original (PDF) on 2012-11-05.
- Cleland, Robert Glass (2005) [1941]. The Cattle on a Thousand Hills: Southern California, 1850-1880. Huntington Library, University of California Press. ISBN 978-0-87328-097-6. OCLC 57693316.
- Coscia, David (2011). Pacific Electric and the Growth of the San Fernando Valley (1st ed.). Bellflower, California: Shade Tree Books. ISBN 978-1-57864-735-4. OCLC 771938987.
- Dumke, Glenn S. (1991) [1944]. The Boom of the Eighties in Southern California (6th ed.). Huntington Library. ISBN 0-87328-003-2. OCLC 228662953.
- Gumprecht, Blake (1999). The Los Angeles River: Its Life, Death, and Possible Rebirth. Baltimore, Maryland: Johns Hopkins University Press. ISBN 0-8018-6642-1. OCLC 607227293 – via Internet Archive.
- Hoffman, Abraham (1981). Vision or Villainy: Origins of the Owens Valley–Los Angeles Water Controversy. Texas A&M University Press. ISBN 0-89096-509-9. OCLC 44957282 – via Internet Archive.
- Jorgensen, Lawrence C. (1982). The San Fernando Valley Past and Present. Los Angeles, California: Pacific Rim Research. ISBN 0-941014-00-2. OCLC 8668305.
- Kielbasa, John R. (1998). Historic Adobes of Los Angeles County. Pittsburgh, Pennsylvania: Dorrance Publishing Company. ISBN 0-8059-4172-X. OCLC 39318772..
- Link, Tom; Cordova-Molmud, Laura; Kelly, Robert J. (1991). Universal City - North Hollywood: a centennial portrait: an illustrated history (1st ed.). Chatsworth, California: Windsor Publications. ISBN 0-89781-393-6. OCLC 22812623.
- Mulholland, Catherine (2000). William Mulholland and the rise of Los Angeles. Berkeley: University of California Press. ISBN 0-52021-724-1. OCLC 49570139 – via Internet Archive.
- Mullaly, Larry; Petty, Bruce (2002). The Southern Pacific in Los Angeles 1873–1996. San Marino, California: Golden West Books & Los Angeles Railroad Heritage Foundation. ISBN 0-87095-118-1. OCLC 49679842.
- Ripley, Vernette Snyder (March 1947). "The San Fernando Pass". The Quarterly of the Historical Society of Southern California. XXIX (1). Archived from the original on 5 March 2012.
- Roderick, Kevin (2002) [2001]. The San Fernando Valley: America's Suburb (2nd ed.). Los Angeles Times Books. ISBN 1-883792-55-X. OCLC 611202438.
- Levick, Melba; Young, Stanley (2004) [1988]. The Missions of California (3rd ed.). San Francisco: Chronicle Books. ISBN 0-8118-3694-0. OCLC 55681195.
- Yenne, Bill (2004). The Missions of California. San Diego, California: Thunder Bay Press. ISBN 9781592233199. OCLC 56347927.
