= Rancho Ex-Mission San Fernando =

Coordinates: 34.230°N 118.480°W

Rancho Ex-Mission San Fernando was a 116,858-acre (472.91 km^{2}) Mexican land grant in present-day Los Angeles County, California, granted in 1846 by Governor Pío Pico to Eulogio F. de Celis. The grant derives its name from the secularized Mission San Fernando Rey de España, but was called ex-Mission because of a division made of the lands held in the name of the mission—the church retaining the grounds immediately around, and all of the lands outside of this were called ex-Mission lands. The grant encompassed most of the present-day San Fernando Valley.

== History ==
=== Mission secularization and land ===
After Mexico's independence from Spain in 1821, the Mexican Congress passed a Decree for the Secularization of the Missions of the Californias on August 17, 1833, in an effort to prevent the influence of the formerly Spanish system in the California territories, allow secular use of the rich and valuable mission lands, and to legislate the emancipation of the indigenous mission wards.

Governor José Figueroa officially secularized the San Fernando Rey de España Mission in 1834, appointing Lieutenant Antonio del Valle as comisionado in October to conduct its secularization and administer the mission property. Lieutenant Del Valle was the descendant of a wealthy Jalisco family who had served under the Spanish army in colonial Alta California. As comisionado, Lieutenant Del Valle took charge of the mission estate by inventory from the stationed missionary, Fray Francisco González de Ibarra, who delivered $20,000 in hides, tallow, and other products, and $5,000 in coins. At this time, the mission population had decreased to 792.

==== Mayordomo administration and ex-mission land grants ====
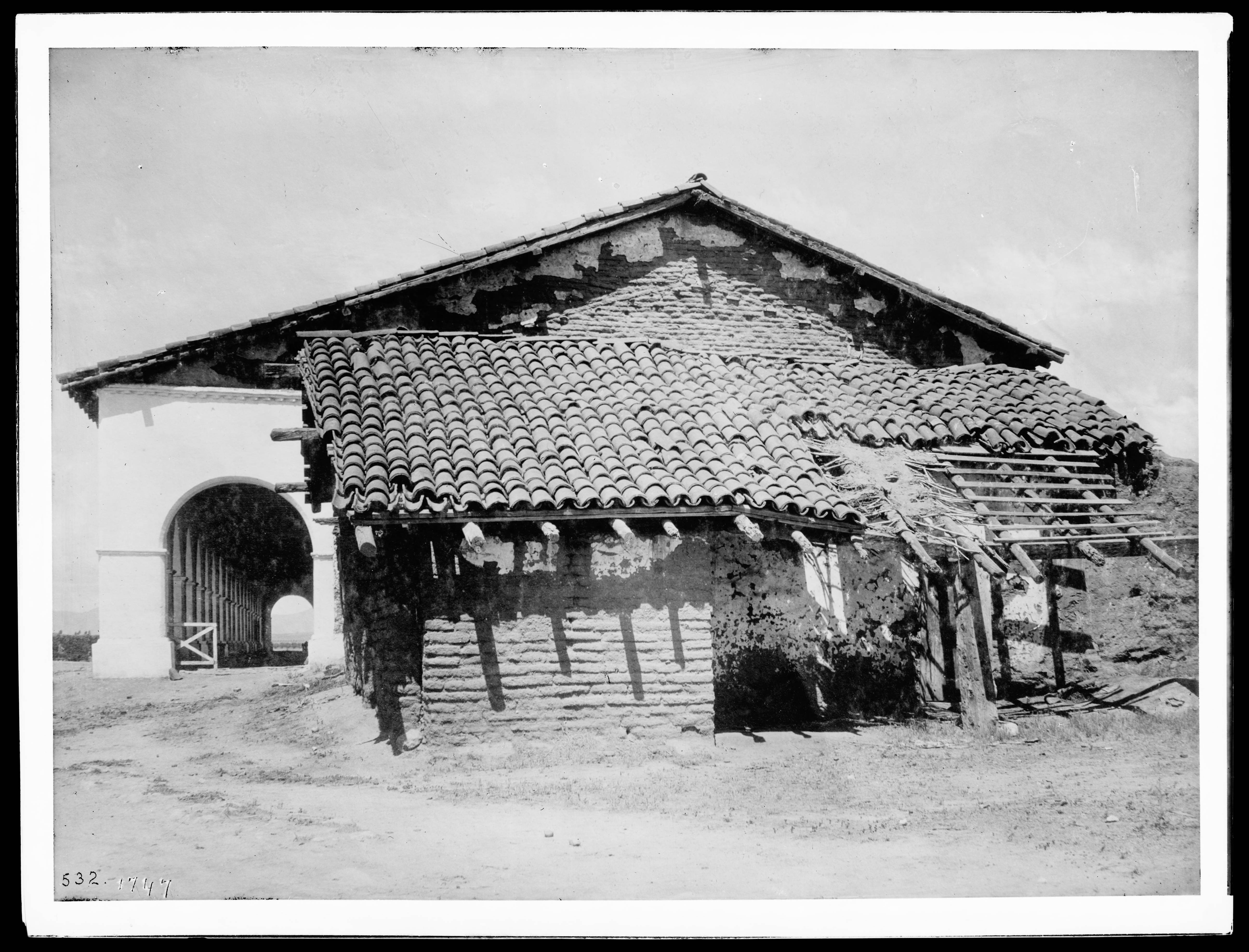
The decaying mayordomo house with the convento building behind it, circa 1900.

On May 29, 1835, the government appointed Lieutenant Del Valle as mayordomo, despite opposition from Fray Ibarra. Around this time, a two-room adobe and tile-roofed house was built at the east end of the convento building to house the mayordomo. Del Valle conducted an inventory of the mission on July 26, 1835. The 1835 inventory showed a valuation of $41,714; buildings other than the church and sacristy were valued at $15,511, its 32,000 grapevines were worth $16,000, its 1,600 fruit trees were valued at $2,400, the mission's library of 191 volumes was worth $417, and the estate had credits worth $5,736. There were 6,000 head of large stock, 520 horses and mules, and 3,000 head of sheep; the average crop was 1,530, 940 of which were wheat, 470 corn, and 45 beans. The indigenous population of the mission had decreased to 541.

Del Valle had an interest in owning the mission land. In 1833, he made a request to claim Rancho San Francisco, which had been an estancia of the San Fernando Mission in the Santa Clarita Valley; the missionaries opposed the claim and they filed a protest which successfully kept the land out of Del Valle's hands. After having been mayordomo in San Fernando, he made a second request for Rancho San Francisco to governor Juan Bautista Alvarado, with whom he had ties, and it was approved by the governor on January 22, 1839.

Del Valle was followed by Anastasio Carrillo who succeeded him as mayordomo on January 3, 1837, though Del Valle is reported to have held his position until March 1837. Another mayordomo, Pedro López, and his brother Francisco made a successful request to claim Rancho Tujunga, east of the mission lands, some time between late 1840 and early 1841. In 1840, the mission property had an inventory of 4,130 cattle, 2,647 horses, 2,500 sheep, 60 mules, 33 donkeys, and 30 hogs.

As part of the mandated secularization of the missions and the emancipation of their indigenous wards, those who obtained Mexican citizenship were able to, singly or in partnerships, petition to acquire land grants of ex-mission land, and several Fernandeño natives did. In 1843, Samuel, a Tataviam man, petitioned for and was granted a 1,000 vara tract of land northwest of the mission complex. Pedro Joaquín and thirty eight others were granted a large square league tract south of Samuel's tract. A partnership of three Tongva men, Tiburcio Cayo, Román, and Francisco Papabubaba, were granted Rancho Los Encinos. José Miguel Triunfo was granted a quarter square league parcel called Rancho Cahuenga, southeast of the mission, in May 1843. In 1845, another partnership of three Fernandeños, Urbano Chari, José Odón, and Manuel, were granted Rancho El Escorpión, a little over a half square league in the west of the mission lands.

==== Franciscan re-administration and governor Pico ====
In March 1843, governor Manuel Micheltorena issued a decree which ordered the return of Franciscan administration over the missions. Fray Blas Ordaz managed the estate after it was restored to the religious order; during his tenure, Ordaz managed to pay off the estate's debt, purchased 120 head of livestock, and made improvements to the mission; the indigenous mission population at this time was of about 300 people. Micheltorena's decree, along with other actions by the governor, were repudiated by the Californios; they eventually rebelled against Micheltorena, forcing him to leave the territory in February 1845 and installing Pío Pico as governor.

The new governor Pico appropriated the mission land from Fray Ordaz and leased it, without an official grant deed or title, to his brother Andrés Pico and a business partner, Juan Manso, in December 1845 for an annual rent of $1,120. The parcels belonging to the Fernandeños Samuel and Pedro Joaquín were aggregated into the Rancho Ex-Mission de San Fernando.

=== Rancho ===
To raise war funds during the Mexican–American War, the Pico government sold the secularized lands from the Mission San Fernando to Eulogio de Celis on June 17, 1846, for $14,000. Eulogio de Celis, was a native of Spain, who had settled in California in 1836; he operated a hide trading business with Henry D. Fitch, Jonathan Temple and Abel Stearns, and was married to Josefa Argüello, daughter of ex-governor Luís Antonio Argüello. De Celis was bound by the provisions of the sale to continue supporting the mission's functions by providing necessary resources for worship and allowing the indigenous former mission wards use of the lands they occupied during their lifetimes. Fray Ordaz continued as the stationed missionary until May 1847.

With the cession of California to the United States following the Mexican–American War, the 1848 Treaty of Guadalupe Hidalgo provided that the land grants would be honored. As required by the Land Act of 1851, a claim was filed with the United States Public Land Commission in 1852 and the land grant was patented to Eulogio de Celis in 1873. De Celis, with his wife and family, went back to Spain in 1854, where he died in 1869.

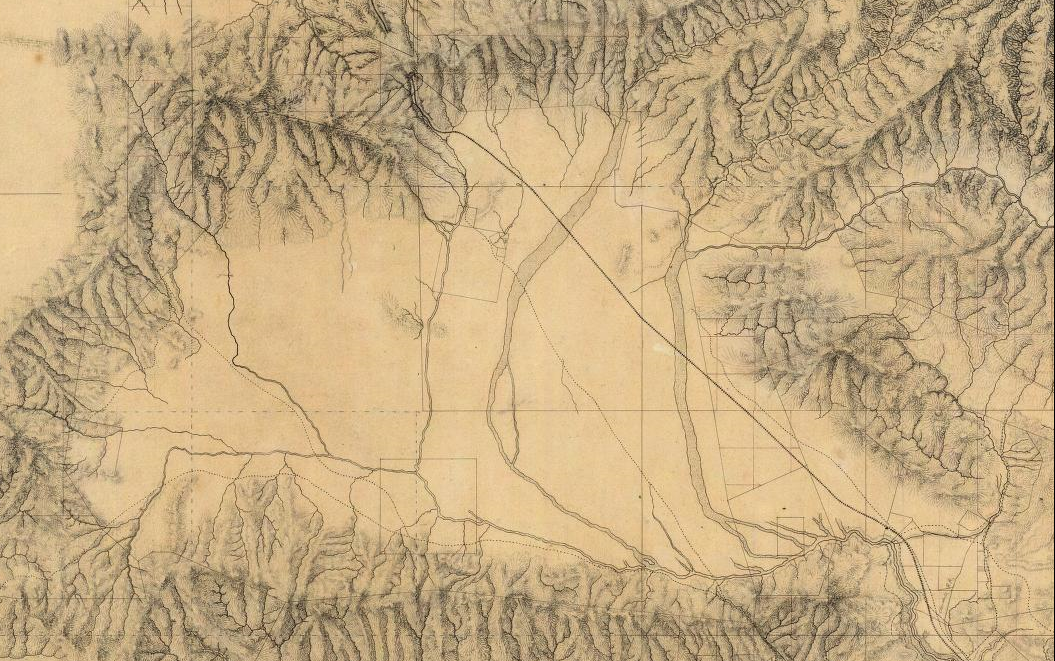
San Fernando Valley: 1880 map with land grant boundaries

The grant, which was supposed to contain fourteen square leagues, was bounded on the north by Rancho San Francisco and the Santa Susana Mountains, on the west by the Simi Hills, on the east by Rancho Tujunga, and on the south by the Montañas de Portesuelo (Santa Monica Mountains). When the Rancho Ex-Mission San Fernando grant was patented in 1873, it was surveyed at nearly twenty six square leagues, the single largest land grant in California.

Before the De Celis grant, Andrés Pico, brother of Governor Pío Pico, had leased the Rancho Ex-Mission San Fernando in 1845. In 1853, Andrés Pico acquired an undivided half interest, and Rancho Ex-Mission San Fernando was split in half, along present-day Roscoe Boulevard, between Andrés Pico (who had the southern half of the ranch to the Santa Monica Mountains) and Eulogio de Celis (who had the northern half of the ranch to the Santa Susana Mountains).

In debt, Andrés Pico had sold his southern half-interest in the Rancho ex-Mission San Fernando to his brother Pío Pico in 1862. Pio Pico sold his half share of the Ex-San Fernando Mission land to Isaac Lankershim (operating as the "San Fernando Farm Homestead Association") in 1869. In 1873, Isaac Lankershim's son, James Boon Lankershim, and future son-in-law, Isaac Newton Van Nuys, moved to the San Fernando Valley and took over management of the property. During the 1880s, the San Fernando Farm Homestead Association was succeeded by the "Los Angeles Farm & Milling Company".

After De Celis died in 1869, his son, Eulogio F. de Celis, returned from Spain to Los Angeles. In 1874, the heirs of Eulogio de Celis sold their northern half of Rancho Ex-Mission San Fernando to northern Californians, California State Senator Charles Maclay and his partners George K. Porter, a San Francisco shoe manufacturer, and his cousin Benjamin F. Porter. The Porters land was west of present-day Sepulveda Boulevard, and the Maclay land was east of Sepulveda Boulevard. About 1875, the E. De Celis holdings in the Ex-Mission San Fernando were sold by E. F. de Celis, for his late father, to G. K. Porter and ex-State Senator C. Maclay for $125,000. According to his affidavit, Eulogio De Celis's attorney. Anson Brunson, later Judge of the Superior Court of Los Angeles County, received $3750 from Maclay for betraying his client in the deal. That is, Maclay was ready to pay $125,000, and offered to give Brunson "half of what he could get the ranch for below that sum." Brunson told De Celis, his client. that he could get $115,000. De Celis had made up his mind not to take less than $120,000; they split the difference and made the price $117.500. This jockeyed the client out of $7,500 and gave his lawyer $3,750 for his assistance in the deal. The case went up to the Supreme Court of California, which found the case a fraud and prohibited Brunson from receiving Maclay's $3,750 bribe.

== See also ==
- History of the San Fernando Valley to 1915
- List of Los Angeles Historic-Cultural Monuments in the San Fernando Valley
- Rómulo Pico Adobe
- Ranchos of California

== Bibliography ==
- Engelhardt, Zephyrin (1897). The Franciscans in California. Harbor Springs, Michigan: Holy Childhood Indian School.
- Pauley, Kenneth E. (2005). San Fernando, Rey de España: an illustrated history. Spokane, Washington: Arthur H. Clark Company. p. 199. ISBN 978-0-87062-338-7 – via Internet Archive.
- Robinson, William Wilcox (1979) [1948]. Land in California: The Story of Mission Lands, Ranchos, Squatters, Mining Claims, Railroad Grants, Land Scrip, Homesteads. Berkeley: University of California Press. ISBN 9780520038752. OCLC 5425363.
