= San Fernando Building =

- The San Fernando Building
- U.S. National Register of Historic Places
- Los Angeles Historic-Cultural Monument
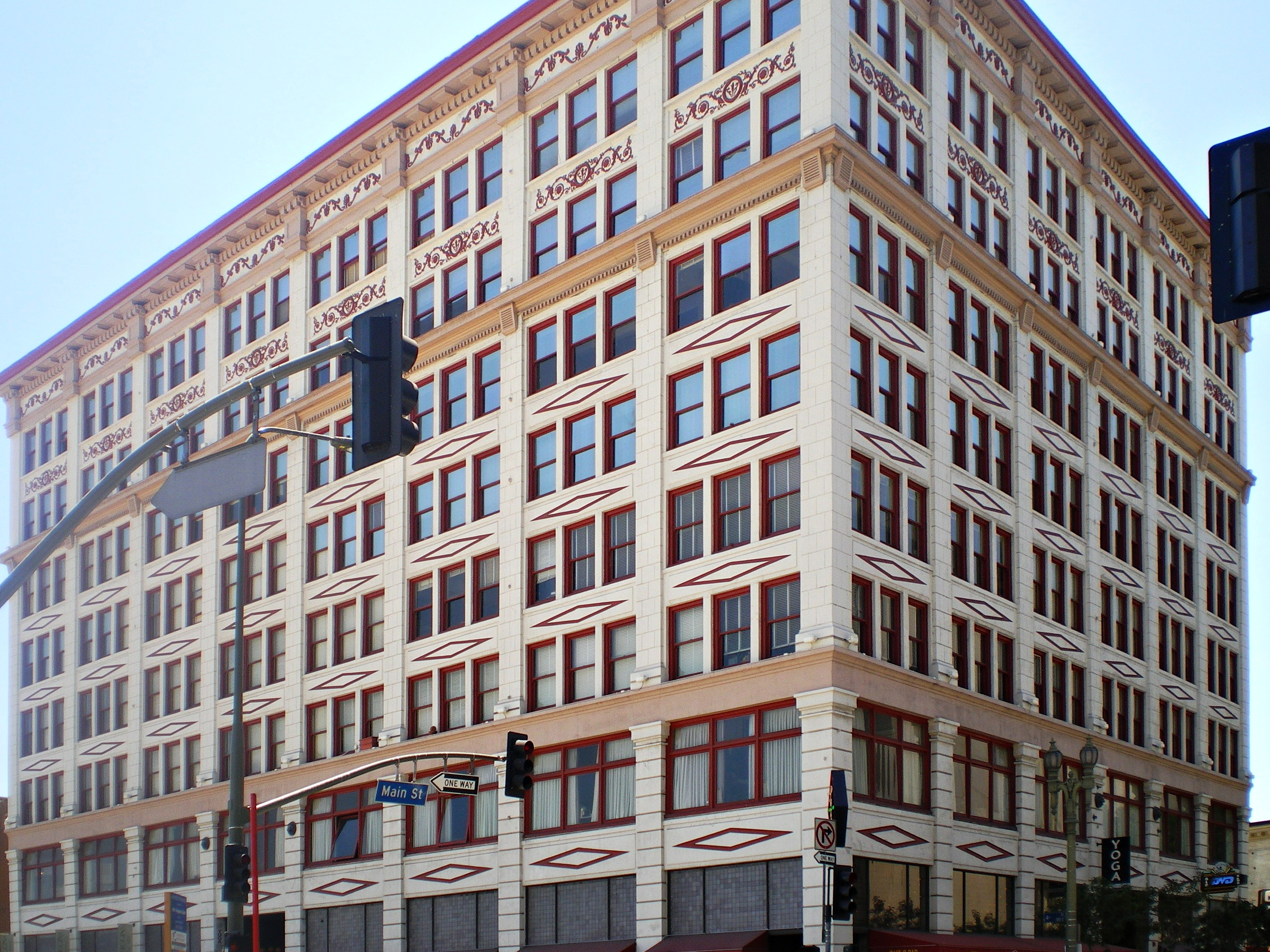
- San Fernando Building, 2008

- Location within the Los Angeles metropolitan area Location within California Location within the United States
- Location: 400-410 S. Main St., Los Angeles, California
- Coordinates: 34°2′52″N 118°14′50″W
- Built: 1906
- Architect: Blee, John F., et al.
- Architectural style: Italian Renaissance Revival
- NRHP reference No.: 86002098
- LAHCM No.: 728
- Added to NRHP: July 31, 1986

The San Fernando Building is an Italian Renaissance Revival style building built in 1906 on Main Street in the Historic Core district of downtown Los Angeles, California. It was listed in the National Register of Historic Places in 1986, converted into lofts in 2000, and declared a Historic-Cultural Monument in 2002.

== Architecture and construction ==
James Boon Lankershim (1850-1931), a wealthy wheat farmer and miller whose father owned much of the San Fernando Valley in the late 19th century, hired architect John F. Blee to design the building. Constructed at a reported cost of $200,000, the building opened in 1907 and was considered one of the finest office buildings in the city. The lobby has a 22-foot ceiling, and the exterior is decorated with elaborate cornice work and spandrel panels with an incised diamond motif. Originally a six-story structure, two additional stories designed by Robert Brown Young & Son were added in 1911.

== Illegal gambling and police raids ==
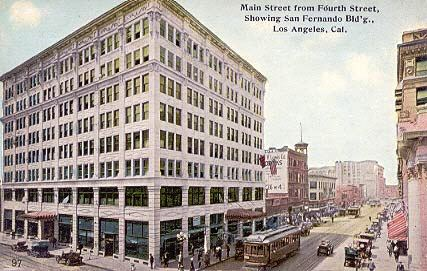
Postcard of San Fernando Building, c. 1915

The building's history includes multiple reports of illegal gambling. The current building web site notes that the building was the site of gambling activities around 1910, resulting in several raids by the police. In each case, however, the gamblers were tipped off to the impending raids and no evidence of gambling was discovered. In 1930 police raided the San Fernando Building again, and arrested eleven men for conducting illegal lottery operations at the building; police also arrested a woman for possession of eight quarts of liquor. The Los Angeles Times described the building as "local headquarters for various well-known lotteries."

== Other points of interest in building's early history ==
In addition to its association with gambling and lotteries, the San Fernando Building was known for the many legitimate businesses operating there. Other highlights from the building's early history include:

- In 1907 the Los Angeles Realty Board and the California State Realty Federation, responsible for investigating real estate fraud and other "queer deals," moved into the building.
- In 1908, the newly formed California Colony and Home Promoting Association opened an office in the San Fernando Building. The Association, formed in June 1908 by Lt. Col. Allen Allensworth (USA, ret.), Dr. William A. Payne, and other Black Angelenos promoted the development of Allensworth, California, a new community in southwest Tulare County that would be settled and governed by African Americans. During its heyday in the 1910s, Allensworth had a school, library, two churches, and several farms, stores, and businesses. In 1976, the townsite became Colonel Allensworth State Historic Park.
- In 1913 physicians and surgeons formed the city's first cooperative telephone exchange at the San Fernando Building. The system was intended to provide 24-hour communication between doctors and patients, freeing doctors to attend the theater or make an out-of-town trip.
- The California Film Exchange, housing film stock from Hollywood's early motion pictures, was located in Unit 110 of the building. In October 1913 a fire broke out destroying some 150 motion pictures. The fire was caused by an overheated motor, leading to two explosions when the flames reached chemicals stored at the exchange. Three individuals, including a fireman, were hospitalized; the night operator of the physicians' telephone exchange located above the film office narrowly escaped the flames. The fire led to calls to prohibit the storage of highly flammable films in downtown office buildings.
- In 1917 the "Half Century Association" was founded, establishing its headquarters on the seventh floor of the San Fernando Building. The association was organized for the purpose of "breaking down the unjust age limit" set by government and private business for civil and private service and "to do for the man who has passed the half-century mark what the Y.M.C.A. does for the young men of the country."
- The U.S. Army operated its Los Angeles recruiting station at the corner of Fourth and Main in the San Fernando Building during World War I. When the United States entered the war in the spring of 1917, the Los Angeles Times reported that "the offices in the San Fernando Building were crowded during the day with applicants for enlistment in the National Guard and Reserve Corps." The building served as the Army's recruiting center again during World War II, as the Times reported on Hollywood actors joining in "the long service induction line in the San Fernando Building."

== Historic designations ==
The building was listed in the National Register of Historic Places in 1986 and was designated a Historic-Cultural Monument (HCM #728) by the Los Angeles Cultural Heritage Commission in 2002.

== Conversion to loft space ==
In the 1980s and 1990s, the area surrounding the San Fernando Building had become part of skid row. In 1998, Gilmore Associates announced plans to convert the San Fernando Building and two other early 20th-century buildings located nearby (the Hellman and Continental Buildings) into 230 lofts. Gilmore's plan to convert a block of skid row into upscale lofts was initially met with skepticism; one expert described the location as desolate, and opined that the lack of such amenities as a grocery store nearby could make the project "a tough sell." However, the Los Angeles Times saw the project as having the potential to change the downtown area: "That distant sound of hammers you hear is coming from the corner of Spring and 4th, where developer Tom Gilmore has initiated an amazing project...Gilmore has assembled an entire block of buildings extending along 4th Street, from Spring to Main. It includes the 12-story Continental Building, generally regarded as the city's first skyscraper; the Farmers and Merchants Bank complex, and the San Fernando Building, built by potentate developer James B. Lankershim."

The San Fernando Building was the first of the three buildings to reopen in August 2000, and by March 2001, the building was 93% leased to tenants paying rents between $790 and $6,000 per month. The converted buildings consisted of large, open lofts with high ceilings and no interior walls except for the bathrooms. The conversion was designed by architect Wade Killefer, who noted, "What lends these buildings to residential use is lots of windows and high ceilings, offering wonderful light." The combined project became known as the Old Bank District lofts.

The gentrification of skid row has drawn criticism from homeless advocates. Alice Callaghan of Las Familias Del Pueblo said, "Skid row is the last place in the community where a person can go if they have no money and no family." Callaghan criticized developers swooping in to buy the area's affordable housing stock: "For them to come and take irreplaceable housing stock for people who have no choice about where to live, so they can have some Disneyland Manhattan experience, is outrageous and immoral."

Baco Mercat, an upscale bar and restaurant, operates on the ground floor of the building in space occupied during World War I by the Army's recruiting station.

== See also ==
- List of Registered Historic Places in Los Angeles
