= Eulogio F. de Celis =

American politician

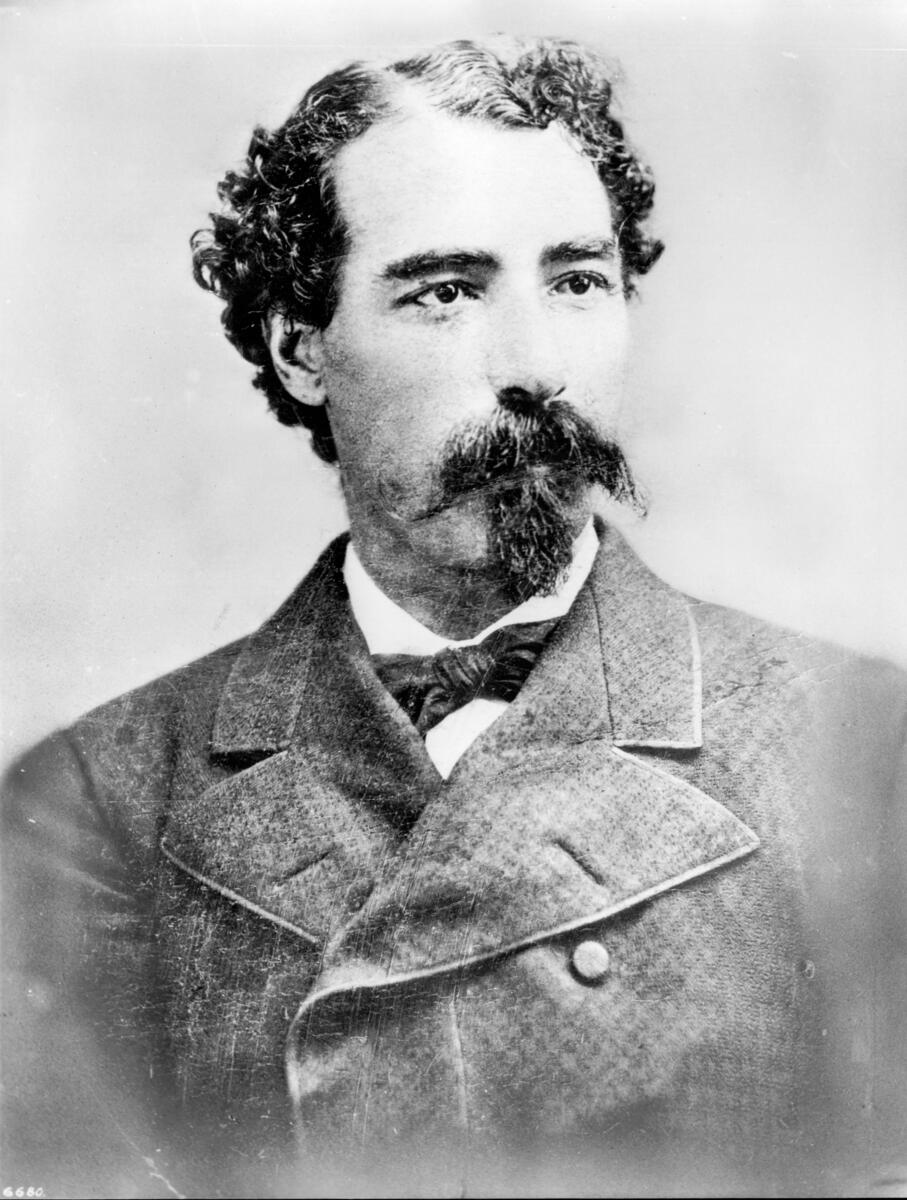

Los Angeles Common Councilman
- In office December 2, 1872 – December 18, 1874

Personal details
- Born: Los Angeles, California
- Died: 1903 San Fernando, California

Eulogio F. de Celis (Jr.) (died 1903) was a Californio ranchero, newspaper publisher, and politician. He once owned most of the San Fernando Valley, now part of Greater Los Angeles. He also served as a member of the Los Angeles Common Council.

== Personal life ==
Eulogio F. de Celis Jr. was born in the Pueblo de Los Ángeles, the son of Eulogio de Celis and Josefa (née Arguello), both of Spanish descent. His father had settled in Mexican Alta California in 1836, and his mother was the daughter of Alta California Governor Luís Antonio Argüello. They acquired the Rancho Ex-Mission San Fernando from Mexican governor Pío Pico in 1846.

Young Eulogio was educated both in England and in France. The family moved to Spain in 1854. When the elder de Celis died in 1869, the family returned to Los Angeles.

In 1854, de Celis (Sr.) sold the southern half of the rancho to Andres Pico, the governor's brother. In 1875, de Celis (Jr.) sold the remaining northern half of his late father's holdings, which were facing foreclosure, to Charles Maclay and George K. Porter.

Media

The Los Angeles Times said of him that:

He spent money with a lavish hand, and his friends and associates shared in his generosity, as many old settlers here remember. One historian states that Señor De Celis bought a lot near the site of the Westminster Hotel, built one of the best houses in the city at that time, and presented it outright to a friend who was in straitened circumstances.

He is described as a polished, cultured gentleman of attractive personality, who in his prosperity had hosts of friends, but for several years before his death he was abjectly poor, and at one time almost blind, though later his sight was partially restored.

Death

De Celis died impoverished in May 1903, leaving a widow, two sons, and two daughters. He had two brothers, José Miguel and Pastor de Celis.

The Times noted:

There was a pathetic little funeral yesterday at the old Spanish Church. The casket was of the plainest and there were no flowers; indeed, not even pallbearers to carry it from the hearse to the altar. A few mourners, a small group of friends of the family in former years, mostly women, followed the body borne by men who happened to be passing at the time, down the aisle to the front seats. A spectator would never have imagined . . . that the man . . . was at one time one of the well-known figures of Los Angeles, and the son of a prominent capitalist of early days who counted his leagues by thousands . . . .

== Los Angeles ==
=== Vocations ===
De Celis was editor of the Spanish-language newspaper La Cronica, which had been founded in Los Angeles in 1872. In 1878, he was publishing a newspaper called La Reforma, and he was attacked editorially by the Los Angeles Daily Herald, which said he had not paid a bill owed to the Herald for printing his newspaper. "He can come and pay the charges overdue for presswork and take his forms away, and this time he must keep them away, for he is such bad pay that we shall no longer subject ourselves to the worry of the job."

He translated Confessions of a Filibuster by Horace Bell into Spanish, which was published by La Cronica in a series during October 1877. It was reproduced by the Guatemalan Museum in 1956.

==== Common Council ====
De Celis was elected to represent the 3rd Ward in the Los Angeles Common Council, the governing body of the city, on December 2, 1872, and he was reelected on December 1, 1873. His second term ended December 18, 1874.

=== San Fernando Valley ===
De Celis's father, known as Eulogio de Celis, settled in the Pueblo de Los Angeles in 1836 and operated a hide trading business with Henry D. Fitch, Jonathan Temple, and Abel Stearns. In 1846, to raise war funds during the Mexican–American War, the Pio Pico government sold the secularized lands from the Mission San Fernando to the senior de Celis.

With the cession of California to the United States following the Mexican–American War, the 1848 Treaty of Guadalupe Hidalgo provided that the land grants would be honored. As required by the Land Act of 1851, a claim was filed with the United States Public Land Commission in 1852 and the land grant was patented to Eulogio de Celis in 1873.

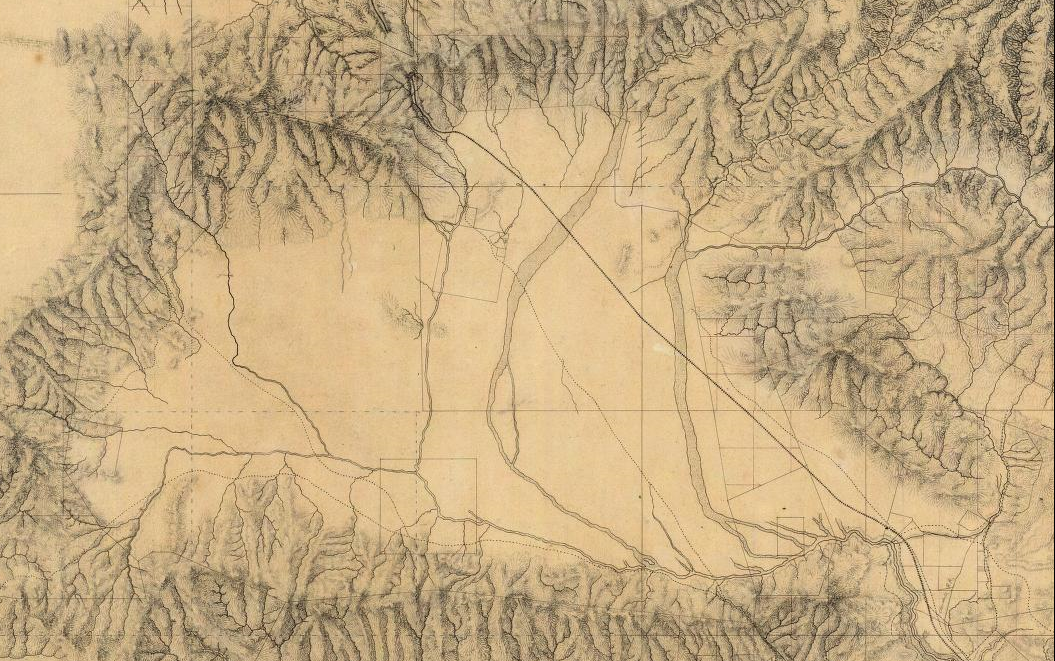
San Fernando Valley: 1880 map with land grant boundaries

The grant, which was supposed to contain fourteen square leagues, was bounded on the north by Rancho San Francisco and the Santa Susana Mountains, on the west by the Simi Hills, on the east by Rancho Tujunga, and on the south by the Montañas de Portesuelo (Santa Monica Mountains). When the Rancho Ex-Mission San Fernando grant was patented in 1873, it was surveyed at nearly twenty-six square leagues, the single largest land grant in California. It amounted to "nearly 120,000 acres, virtually all of the Valley save for the Encino and a few other ranchos,"

De Celis and his brothers, Jose Miguel and Pastor, deeded a parcel of land in Newhall in the Santa Clarita Valley for use as a railroad station for the sum of one dollar.

In 1875, Eulogio F. de Celis sold what was left of his father's holdings, which were facing foreclosure, to Charles Maclay and George K. Porter for $125,000.
