= Isaac Newton Van Nuys =

American land developer

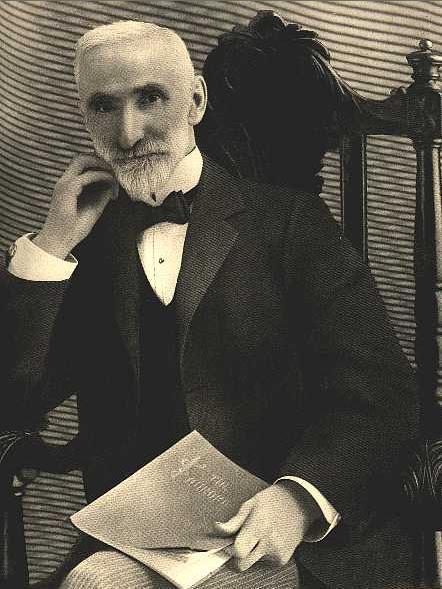
- Born: November 20, 1836; West Sparta, New York, US
- Died: February 12, 1912 (aged 75); Los Angeles, California, US
- Occupations: Land developer, agriculture, banker
- Spouse: Susanna H. Lankershim
- Children: 3
- Relatives: Isaac Lankershim (father-in-law); James Boon Lankershim (brother-in-law)

Isaac Newton Van Nuys (/væn ˈnaɪz/ van NYZE; November 20, 1836 – February 12, 1912) was an American businessman, farmer and rancher who owned the entire southern portion of the San Fernando Valley, an area 15 miles long and 6 miles wide. With the approach of the Owens River aqueduct and the possibility of intensive small farming, Los Angeles speculators, including Harry Chandler of the Los Angeles Times, combined to buy out Van Nuys in 1909 and develop the San Fernando Valley.

A development syndicate bought him out in 1911 and founded the town of Van Nuys in 1911. Its namesake was made the community's honorary godfather and died a year later. His legacy includes the town, schools, streets, libraries, and a Liberty Ship named in his honor.

== Early life ==
Isaac Van Nuys was born in West Sparta, New York, the son of Peter Van Nuys and Harriet Kerr. His father was born in Millstone, New Jersey, on February 7, 1808, moved to West Sparta in 1822, became a farmer, and eventually owned 500 acres (2.0 km^{2}). He also served as a town supervisor and justice of the peace. He died January 2, 1875. Their patrilineal ancestor was Auke Jans van Nuys, a Dutch carpenter who came to New Netherland around 1651 from Nuis, in western Groningen, and settled on Long Island. Kerr was born in Cayuga County, New York, on April 13, 1809. Peter and Harriet were married on November 19, 1829. They had seven children, Caroline M. Van Nuys (born June 4, 1833); Isaac N.; A. Vinton Van Nuys (born June 8, 1840); Ella L. Van Nuys (November 22, 1842 – July 22, 1843); Harriett E. Van Nuys (January 9, 1844 – August 9, 1871); Webster B. Van Nuys (born February 8, 1847); and Herbert K. Van Nuys (born April 22, 1852).

Issac attended the academy at Lima in which he was a student for one year.

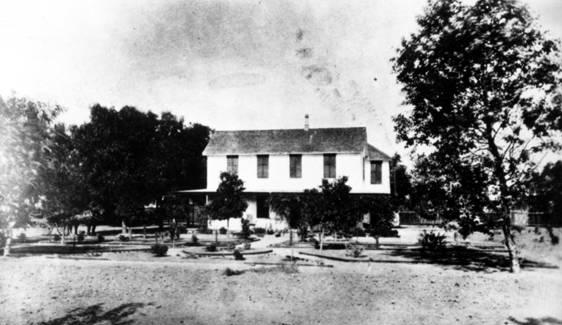
1882 Van Nuys home of Isaac Newton Van Nuys

== Career ==
=== San Fernando Homestead Association ===
In 1865, at the age of 29, Van Nuys was the first family member to move to California. He first lived in Napa and later in Monticello, where he owned a country store. In 1871, he moved to Los Angeles, where he bought in with Isaac Lankershim's corporation, the San Fernando Homestead Association. In 1869, it had bought the southern half of Rancho Ex-Mission San Fernando totaling 60,000 acres (240 km^{2}) and engaged in the raising of stock, principally sheep. In 1873, Van Nuys and his future brother-in-law Isaac Lankershim's son, James Boon Lankershim, moved to the San Fernando Valley and assumed management of the property. In 1874, they began raising grain, introducing dryland farming. In 1876, they filled two ships with Valley wheat at the Los Angeles Harbor in San Pedro. It was both the first grain cargo shipped from the LA Harbor and the first grain shipped to Europe from California.

=== Los Angeles Farming and Milling Company ===
In 1880, Van Nuys and James Boon Lankershim formed the Los Angeles Farming and Milling Company from the San Fernando Homestead Association. Isaac Van Nuys was its president and manager. The company had a four-story building for milling to produce flour, meals, cracked wheat, hominy, and livestock feed. Van Nuys also served as vice-president of the Farmers and Merchants Bank; a director in the Union Bank of Savings; a director in the Los Angeles Pressed Brick Company; and the owner of the Van Nuys Hotel, erected in 1896 in Downtown Los Angeles.

Signature of Isaac Newton Van Nuys.

As the City of Los Angeles authorized building William Mulholland's Los Angeles Aqueduct from the Owens Valley to the city and valley, land speculation plans for the Los Angeles Farming and Milling Company property in the San Fernando Valley were developed. Aqueduct construction began in 1905 and would be completed in 1913. Afterwards, land that was useful only for dryland farming could be turned into residential towns and irrigated crops and orchards.

=== Los Angeles Suburban Homes Company ===
The Los Angeles Suburban Homes Company, in the "biggest land transaction ever recorded in Los Angeles County," was a syndicate led by Harry Chandler, the business manager of the Los Angeles Times, with Isaac Van Nuys, Hobart Johnstone Whitley, and James Boone Lankershim and acquired "Tract 1000" in 1909 from the Los Angeles Farming and Milling Company owned by Van Nuys and Lankershim. It encompassed the remaining 47,500 acres (192 km^{2}) of the southern half of the former Rancho Ex-Mission San Fernando land grant, everything west of the Lankershim town limits and south of the old furrow (present day Roscoe Boulevard) to the Simi Hills and Santa Monica Mountains, excluding Rancho Los Encinos and Rancho El Escorpión.

The Los Angeles Suburban Homes Company laid out plans for three new towns of Van Nuys, Marion (present-day Reseda), and Owensmouth (present-day Canoga Park and West Hills); a system of roads and streets; and incorporation into the city of Los Angeles to receive the upcoming aqueduct's water. In the "Sale of the Century" in November 1910, it sold the remaining livestock and non-land assets of the Los Angeles Farming and Milling Company at auction. The Los Angeles Times called the auction "the beginning of a new empire and a new era in the Southland." On February 22, 1911, lot sales begin for the new town of Van Nuys. The Janss Investment Company was the initial developer of both it and Owensmouth. The syndicate also built the San Fernando Line, a new 20 miles (32 km) extension of the Pacific Electric railway system from Lankershim (present-day North Hollywood), through Van Nuys and Marion, to its Owensmouth terminus.

== Personal life ==
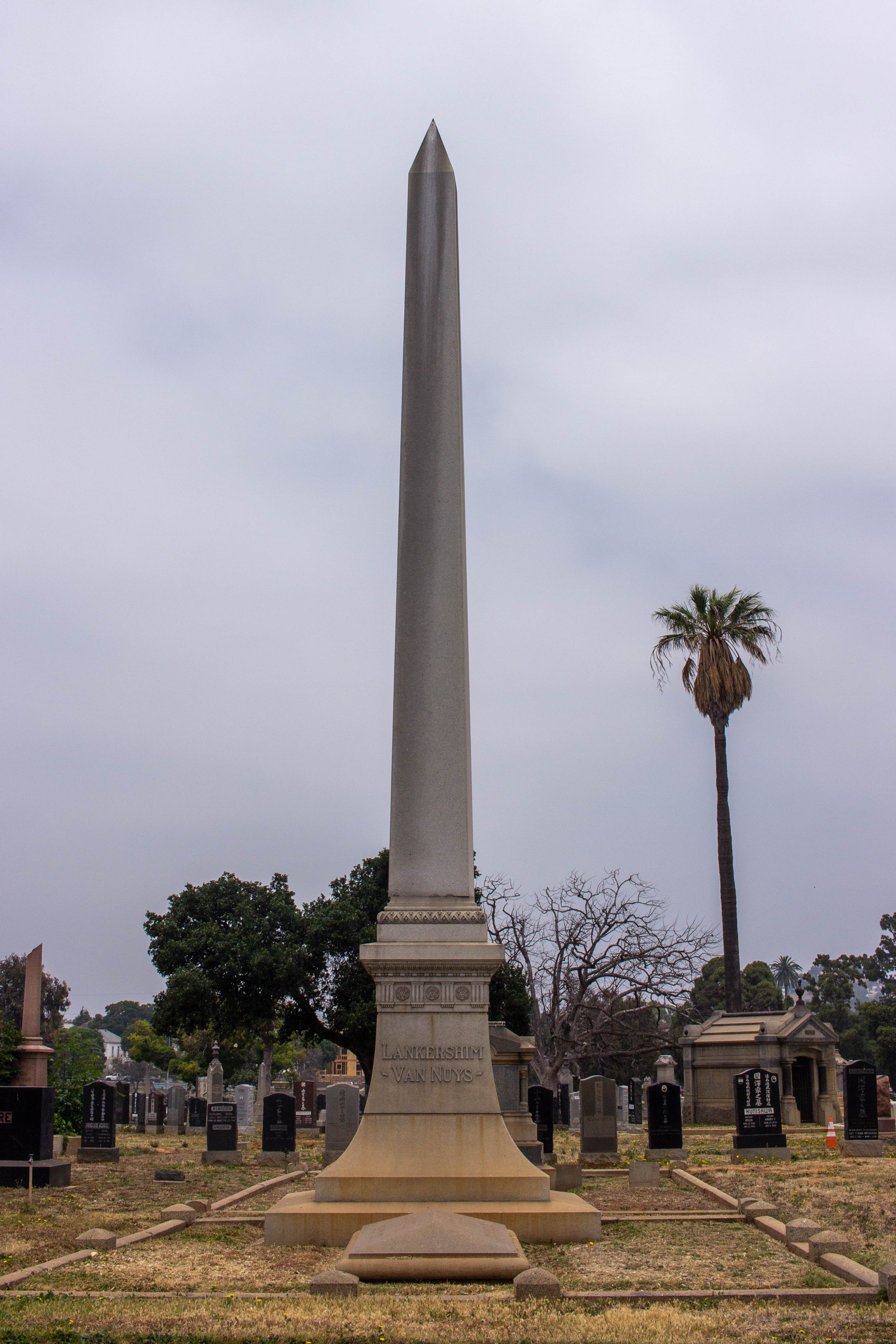
An obelisk marking Van Nuys' grave in East Los Angeles

In 1880, Van Nuys married Susanna H. Lankershim of Los Angeles, the daughter of Isaac Lankershim and the sister of James Boon Lankershim, both of whom were his business partners. They had three children: Annis H., James Benton, and Kate. He was a member of the Masonic order, connected with Pentalpha Blue Lodge, Signet Chapter, Los Angeles Commandery, and Al Malaikah Shrine Temple. He was a Republican and a member of the Baptist Church. He also founded Hollywood Cemetery.

He died at age 75 on February 12, 1912.

== Legacy ==
On February 23, 1944, a Liberty Ship was named for Van Nuys and launched at Los Angeles Harbor in San Pedro, California.

== See also ==
- Van Nuys, Los Angeles, California
- History of the San Fernando Valley to 1915
