= James Boon Lankershim =

American heir, landowner and real estate developer

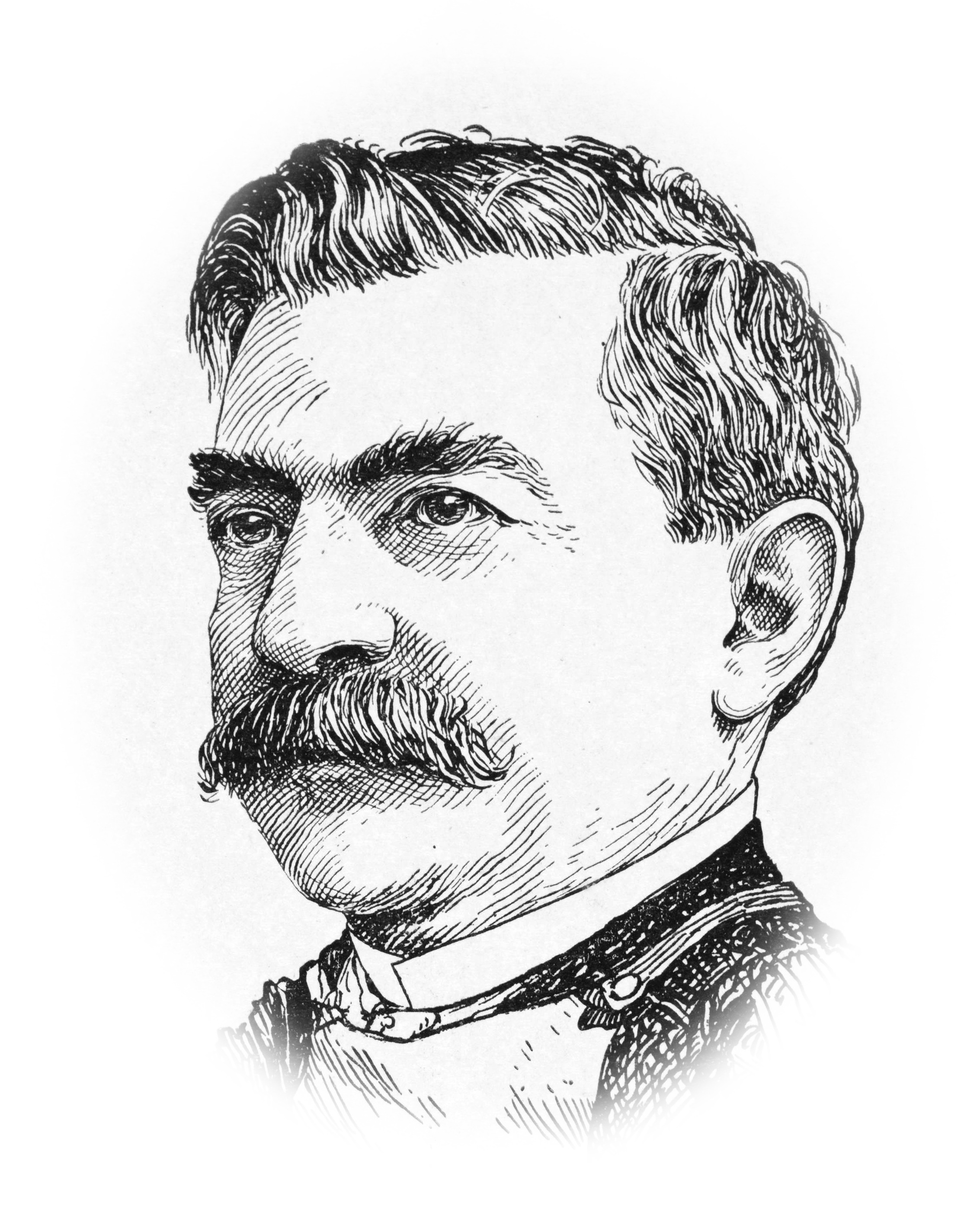
- Sketch of Lankershim c. 1900
- Born: March 24, 1850; Charleston, Missouri, US
- Died: October 16, 1931 (aged 81); Los Angeles County, California, US
- Resting place: San Fernando Valley
- Occupations: Landowner, real estate developer
- Spouse: Carolina Adelaide Jones (m. 1881; div. 1900)
- Children: Jack Lankershim; Doria Lankershim
- Parent(s): Isaac Lankershim; Annis Lydia Moore

James Boon Lankershim (March 24, 1850 – October 16, 1931) was an American heir, landowner and real estate developer.

== Early life ==
James Boon Lankershim was born on March 24, 1850, in Charleston, Missouri. His father was Isaac Lankershim, a German-born Californian landowner who owned 60,000 acres in the San Fernando Valley, and his mother was Annis Lydia Moore, an English-born Californian.

== Career ==
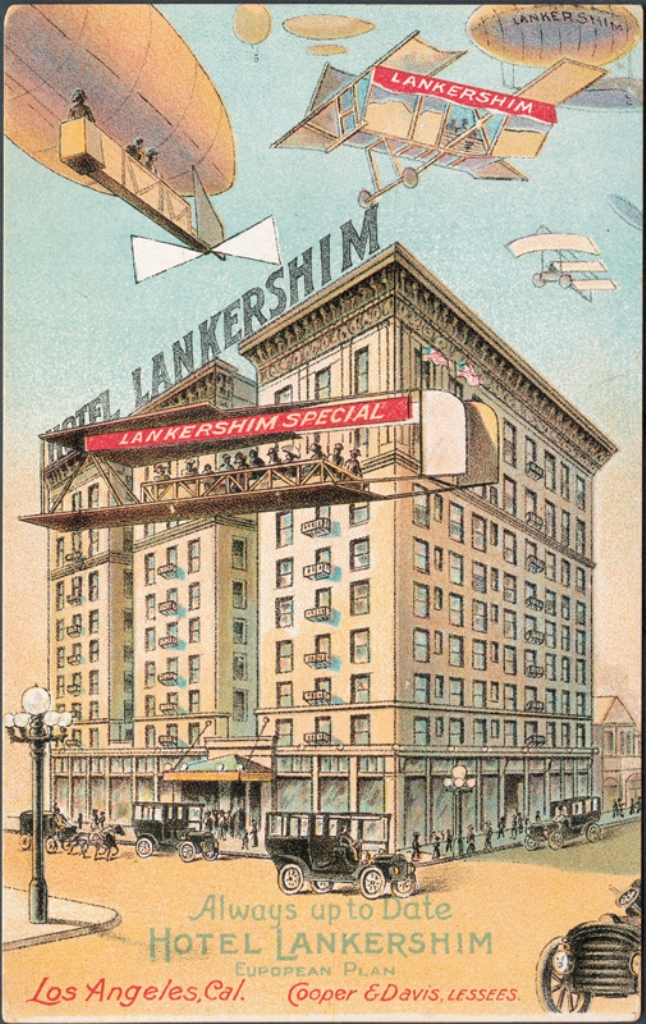
Hotel Lankershim postcard from 1909

Lankershim joined his father's company, the San Fernando Farm Homestead Association, together with his brother in law, Isaac Newton Van Nuys (1836–1912), focusing on real estate while Van Nuys focused on wheat. He built the Hotel Lankershim (completed 1905) on the corner of Broadway and 7th Avenue in Downtown Los Angeles, now demolished and used as space for a parking lot. He also built the San Fernando Building on the corner of 4th Avenue and Main Street, where his name is embedded in the tiles at the entrance.

In 1885, Lankershim established a cavalry unit in the California National Guard, Troop D, and became lieutenant colonel.

Lankershim served as the first president of the Los Angeles Athletic Club, a private member's club in Los Angeles.

== Personal life, death and legacy ==
Lankershim married Carolina "Carrie" Adelaide Jones in 1881. By 1900, they separated and she moved to Paris, only to return briefly during the First World War. They had two children, Jack Lankershim and Doria Lankershim. In the 1920s, he retired and moved to the Biltmore Hotel in downtown Los Angeles. On April 2, 1921, he donated 20 acres in the San Fernando Valley to the Boy Scouts of America, later known as the Arthur Letts Boy Scout Camp after Arthur Letts. In 1940, they built an obelisk in his honor on the donated land.

In 1924, silent actress Adele Blood introduced him to Irene Herbert, a nurse who became his companion for four years until his family fired her. He died on October 16, 1931, and his ashes were scattered across the San Fernando Valley. After his death, Irene Herbert claimed she had a $500,000 promissory note from her former employer and sued the Lankershim family, but later dropped the case and committed suicide.

Lankershim Boulevard in the San Fernando Valley area of Los Angeles is named for the Lankershim family.
