= Isaac Lankershim =

American landowner and pioneer

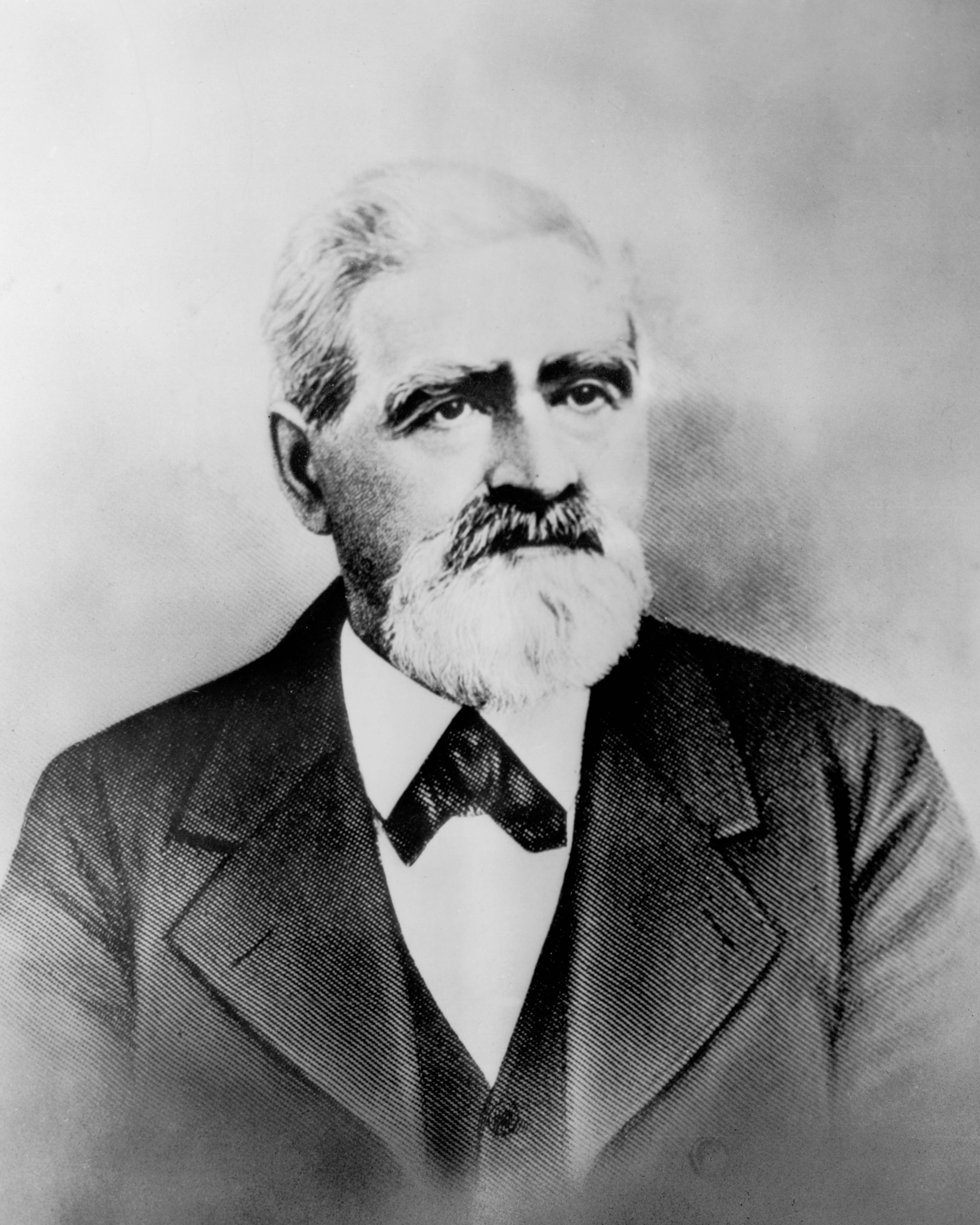
- Lankershim c. 1870
- Born: April 8, 1818-20; Bavaria
- Died: April 10, 1882 (aged 62-64); Los Angeles County, California, U.S.
- Occupations: Landowner; Real estate developer
- Spouse: Annis Lydia Moore (m. 1842)
- Children: 2 (incl. James)
- Relatives: Isaac Newton Van Nuys (son-in-law)

Isaac Lankershim (c. 1819 – April 10, 1882) was an American landowner and pioneer in California. He was the owner of 60,000 acres in Los Angeles County, California.

== Early life ==
Sources from during his life vary on Lankershim's birth year and place. He was born into a Jewish family in the Kingdom of Bavaria, in either the towns of Scheinfeld, Nuremberg, or Albertkunstadt, and on April 8, between 1818 and 1820.

== Career ==
Lankershim settled in St. Louis, Missouri and worked in the grain and livestock shipping business.

In 1854, Lankershim moved west to the Napa Valley in California. A year later, in 1855, he sowed and harvested 1,000 acres of wheat in Solano County, California. Shortly after, he expanded to over 14,000 acres near Fresno, California. In 1868, he purchased a bigger ranch in San Diego, California and grew wheat. In 1860, the rest of his family moved from St. Louis to California, and he established an office in San Francisco, California.

In the late 1860s, Lankershim moved to Los Angeles, California, where he became associated with businessman Harris Newmark. In 1869, Lankershim purchased 60,000 acres of the San Fernando Valley from Pio Pico for US$115,000 together with other businessmen from San Francisco, known as the San Fernando Valley Farm Homestead Association. These acres included what is now Woodland Hills, Tarzana, Encino, Sherman Oaks, Van Nuys and North Hollywood. By 1873, they raised 40,000 sheep on the ranch. When wool prices fell, they grew wheat instead. To take the wheat from the valley to Santa Monica, California, he built a wagon path, which he turned into a toll road in 1876. The route is followed by today's Interstate 405.

With his son-in-law, Isaac Newton Van Nuys, Lankershim started the Los Angeles Farming and Milling Co, and they took over full ownership of the San Fernando Valley Ranch Company. They also established the Lankershim Ranch Land & Water Co., a 12,000-acre real estate development in what is now known as North Hollywood, Los Angeles.

== Personal life, death and legacy ==
Lankershim married Annis Lydia Moore (1818–1901), an English immigrant in 1842. He relinquished his Jewish faith and converted to the Baptist faith. They had a son, James Boon Lankershim (1850–1931), and a daughter, Susanna Lankershim, who married Isaac Newton Van Nuys (1836–1912). He died on April 10, 1882.

Lankershim Boulevard in Los Angeles is named for the Lankershim family.
