= Film à clef =

Cinematographic genre

A film à clef, also known as cinéma à clef, movie à clef, and film à clé (French: [film a kle], lit. 'film with a key'), is a film describing real life, behind a façade of fiction. "Key" in this context means a table one can use to swap out the names. Film à clef is the film equivalent of the literary roman à clef, and the two share the same techniques. Many films à clef are biopics of Hollywood personalities.

== Selected notable films à clef ==
- 8½ (1963) is based on Federico Fellini's experience suffering from "director's block".
- 8 Mile (2002) is inspired by the life of Eminem.
- 21 (2008)
- Adaptation (2002); while parts of the film are adapted from Susan Orlean's non-fiction book The Orchid Thief, most of the film is a heavily fictionalized account of Charlie Kaufman's difficulty in adapting the book into a screenplay.
- All Good Things (2010) is inspired by the life of Robert Durst.
- All the King's Men (1949), is based on the life of Huey Long.
- All That Jazz (1979), a musical film by Bob Fosse loosely based on his struggle with life and health during post production of his 1974 film Lenny and his 1975 Broadway musical Chicago.
- Almost Famous (2000), is based on writer, director Cameron Crowe's experience as a teenaged writer for Rolling Stone magazine.
- Alpha Dog (2006), based on the story of Jesse James Hollywood and the murder of Nicholas Markowitz.
- Annie Hall (1977), believed to be a version of Woody Allen's own relationship with Diane Keaton (whose birth name is Diane Hall). Allen has denied this in interviews, however.
- The Birth of a Nation (1915), Austin Stoneman is based on Thaddeus Stevens.
- The Carpetbaggers (1964), based on the book by Harold Robbins, whose main character, Jonas Cord, is influenced by Howard Hughes
- Casino (1995) is based on Frank Rosenthal and the Stardust casino.
- Citizen Kane (1941), is partially based on the life of William Randolph Hearst.
- A Cock and Bull Story (2005)
- The Devil Wears Prada (2006) is based on Vogue magazine editor Anna Wintour.
- Diva (1981) is based on the early European career of soprano Jessye Norman.
- Dreamgirls (2006), the musical film based on the career of The Supremes.
- The Celebration (1998) was based on an alleged real-life story that director Thomas Vinterberg heard on Danish radio.
- The Fabelmans (2022), loosely based on Steven Spielberg's adolescence and first years as a filmmaker.
- The Five Heartbeats (1991) inspired loosely by the lives of The Temptations, The Dells, The Four Tops, Wilson Pickett, James Brown, Sam Cooke, Frankie Lymon and others.
- The Ghost Writer (2010) (The Ghost in some jurisdictions), based on Tony Blair, 2003 invasion of Iraq, the war on terror, the special relationship and WMD scandals.
- The Goddess (1958) said to be based on Marilyn Monroe.
- The Greek Tycoon (1978), influenced by Aristotle Onassis.
- The Great Dictator (1940), Adenoid Hynkel is based on Adolf Hitler.
- The Mechanism (TV series): about Brazilian political corruption.
- Guru (2007), based on the rise and business practices of Dhirubhai Ambani.
- Henry: Portrait of a Serial Killer (1986)
- I'm Not There (2007), a series of stories loosely inspired by the life of Bob Dylan. While some segments are more literal interpretations of parts of Dylan's life (such as the segment featuring Cate Blanchett), others are heavily fictionalized accounts inspired by Dylan's music (such as the segment featuring Richard Gere).
- Imitation of Life (1934)
- Iruvar (1997), Tamil movie based on true events surrounding the tenuous friendship and later intense political rivalry between Karunanidhi and M.G. Ramachandran.
- Last Days (2005), a barely concealed dramatization of Kurt Cobain's final days.
- The Last Samurai (2003), inspired by the 1876 Satsuma Rebellion and also on the story of Jules Brunet, a French army captain who fought in the Boshin War.
- The Last Tycoon (1976)
- The Life Aquatic with Steve Zissou (2004), which features a protagonist based loosely on Jacques-Yves Cousteau.
- Lost in Translation (2003); Charlotte and John are believed to be based loosely on writer-director Sofia Coppola and her ex-husband, Spike Jonze.
- Magnolia (1999), is loosely inspired by Paul Thomas Anderson's experience in dealing with his father's death from cancer.
- The Master (2012), is widely believed to be inspired by L. Ron Hubbard, the founder of Scientology.
- Mr. Arkadin (1955)
- Monsieur Verdoux (1947), Henri Verdoux is based on Henri Désiré Landru.
- Network (1976)
- The Power and the Glory (1933) is loosely based on the life of C.W. Post.
- Primary Colors (1998) is a thinly veiled depiction of Bill Clinton's 1992 presidential campaign.
- The killers in Psycho (1960), The Texas Chain Saw Massacre (1974), and The Silence of the Lambs (1991) are all modeled closely after Ed Gein, who murdered two women, robbed many graves, and made clothing and furniture out of human skin and bones.
- The killers in Rope (1948), Compulsion (1959), Scream (1996), Funny Games (1997 and 2008), and Murder by Numbers (2002) are all believed to be based on infamous kidnapper-murderer duo Leopold and Loeb, who attempted to commit the perfect crime after learning of Friedrich Nietzsche's Ubermensch Theory.
- Saving Private Ryan (1998), based loosely on the Niland brothers.
- Scarface (1932), is largely based on the life of Al Capone.
- The Sea Hawk (1940), Geoffrey Thorpe is based on Sir Francis Drake.
- The Shootist (1976)
- A Star Is Born (1937)
- Stillwater (2021) is based on the experiences of Curt and Amanda Knox, although the film hinges on the prosecution's disproven version of the incident.
- Sunset Boulevard (1950)
- Sweet Smell of Success (1957) is based on the life of Walter Winchell.
- Talk Radio (1988)
- Velvet Goldmine (1998) is largely based on the career of David Bowie.
- White Hunter Black Heart (1990) based on film director John Huston
- Withnail & I (1987) is based on the experiences of writer/director Bruce Robinson, represented in the film by "I" (Paul McGann), and his friend Vivian MacKerrell, represented in the film by Withnail (Richard E. Grant), as struggling actors living in Camden Town in the late 1960s. The character of Uncle Monty (Richard Griffiths) is based on Italian film director Franco Zeffirelli, who Robinson claims made amorous advances during the filming of Romeo and Juliet.
- Z (1969) is a thinly veiled account of the events surrounding the 1963 assassination of Greek politician Grigoris Lambrakis, which was part of the series of events that led to the country's 1967 military coup.

== See also ==
- Metacinema
- Postmodernist film
- Roman à clef
