= Joshua Lynn =

American lawyer

Joshua Eric Lynn (born December 14, 1969, in Santa Barbara, California) was the Chief Trial Deputy of Santa Barbara County, Santa Barbara, California from 2008 to 2010. He was the lead prosecuting attorney in the trial of Jesse James Hollywood, who was convicted and sentenced to life in prison on February 5, 2010. He was terminated after his loss in an election in 2010.

== Career ==
Lynn received his B.A. from the University of California, Santa Cruz and his J.D. from the University of San Diego School of Law. He was a deputy district attorney for 14 years and was promoted to Chief Trial Deputy for South Santa Barbara County in 2008. He served as District Attorney when the elected District Attorney, Christie Stanley was unable to serve for an extended period of time because of illness. As Chief Trial Deputy, Lynn supervised criminal operations, all prosecutions and all of the deputy district attorneys in the South County of Santa Barbara. He began his career as a prosecutor with the Santa Barbara District Attorney's Office in 1996. After heading up the Domestic Violence unit, he was assigned to gang, three strikes and violent felony cases. He has taught Advanced Evidence at the Santa Barbara School of Law. Lynn received the Thomas Guerry Award in 2006. On June 15, 2010, Lynn was fired from the Santa Barbara County District Attorney’s Office for his alleged conduct following his loss to Joyce Dudley during the County’s District Attorney election.

== Hollywood trial ==
The prosecutor maintained Hollywood kidnapped Nicholas Markowitz on August 6, 2000, from a street near his home, and two days later, in an attempt to cover up the kidnapping, ordered his friends to kill the boy. Although Hollywood was far from the scene of the murder when it occurred, Lynn's task was to prove that Hollywood was as guilty as the man who pulled the trigger. The fact that trial occurred nine years after the murder, added to the difficulty of prosecution of Hollywood. Hollywood was defended by James Blatt, winner of Los Angeles Criminal Courts Bar Association's Trial Lawyer of the Year Award in 2005. Lynn replaced deputy district attorney Ronald J. Zonen, who had been removed from the case because the prosecutor had shared confidential files with movie producers.
