= New Jew High =

New Jew High may refer to:

- New Community Jewish High School, in West Hills, California
- Gann Academy: The New Jewish High School of Greater Boston, in Waltham, Massachusetts
- Weber School, formerly New Atlanta Jewish Community High School, in Sandy Springs, Georgia
