= Chatsworth Nature Preserve Coalition =

American environmental advocacy group

The Chatsworth Nature Preserve Coalition (CNPC) is an advocacy group dedicated to protecting and preserving the Chatsworth Nature Preserve (CNP), located in Chatsworth, California, United States. CNPC actions have included writing letters to local governmental agencies and politicians regarding policy decisions affecting the CNP, and participation in the Earth Day Celebration held annually at the CNP. CNPC members include representatives from local conservation groups and neighboring residents. The group was founded in 2012.
