= De Toledo High School =

de Toledo High School

Location
- West Hills, Los Angeles, California; United States
- 34.193°N 118.620°W

Information
- Type: Private school
- Motto: "Building community, one mind at a time"
- Religious affiliation: Judaism
- Denomination: pluralistic
- Established: 2002
- Dean: Gregory Keer
- Principal: Ellen Howard
- Head of school: Mr. Mark H. Shpall, MA.Ed, J.D.
- Faculty: 70
- Grades: 9-12
- Enrollment: about 400
- Colors: Maroon, Gold
- Athletics: Baseball, Basketball, Cheer, Cross Country, Dance, Equestrian, Flag Football, Golf, Soccer, Softball, Stagecraft, Swimming, Tennis, Theater, Volleyball, Wrestling
- Mascot: Jaguars
- Website: www.dths.org

de Toledo High School, formerly New Community Jewish High School is a private Jewish high school in the West Hills neighborhood of Los Angeles, in the western San Fernando Valley. It is one of the largest Jewish day schools in the United States, and is known as a "very close and tightly knit community."

== History ==
The school was founded in 2002 with 40 students, and was originally located at the West Hills campus of the Jewish Federation of Greater Los Angeles. It outgrew the available space within two years, and relocated its campus to shared spaces at Shomrei Torah Synagogue, a Conservative synagogue in West Hills.

The school outgrew that location also (then with 400 students), and in January 2011 it purchased the entire 5 acre former Jewish Federation campus where it had begun. The school opened its new campus on August 29, 2013 after remodeling was completed by Gensler to begin the 2013–2014 academic year.

In October 2014, after receiving a "transformative gift" from Philip and Alyce de Toledo of Sherman Oaks, the school's trustees decided to rename the school in their honor, beginning with the 2015–2016 school year.

The school offers a college preparatory program for students in grades 9-12 featuring college-preparatory courses, rigorous academics, 18 AP courses, STEM, championship athletic teams, leadership opportunities, extra curricula, comprehensive college counseling, visual/performing arts, summer programs, and global education exchange programs.

== See also ==
- Shadow Ranch Park
