= Chatsworth Nature Preserve =

Nature preserve in Los Angeles, California

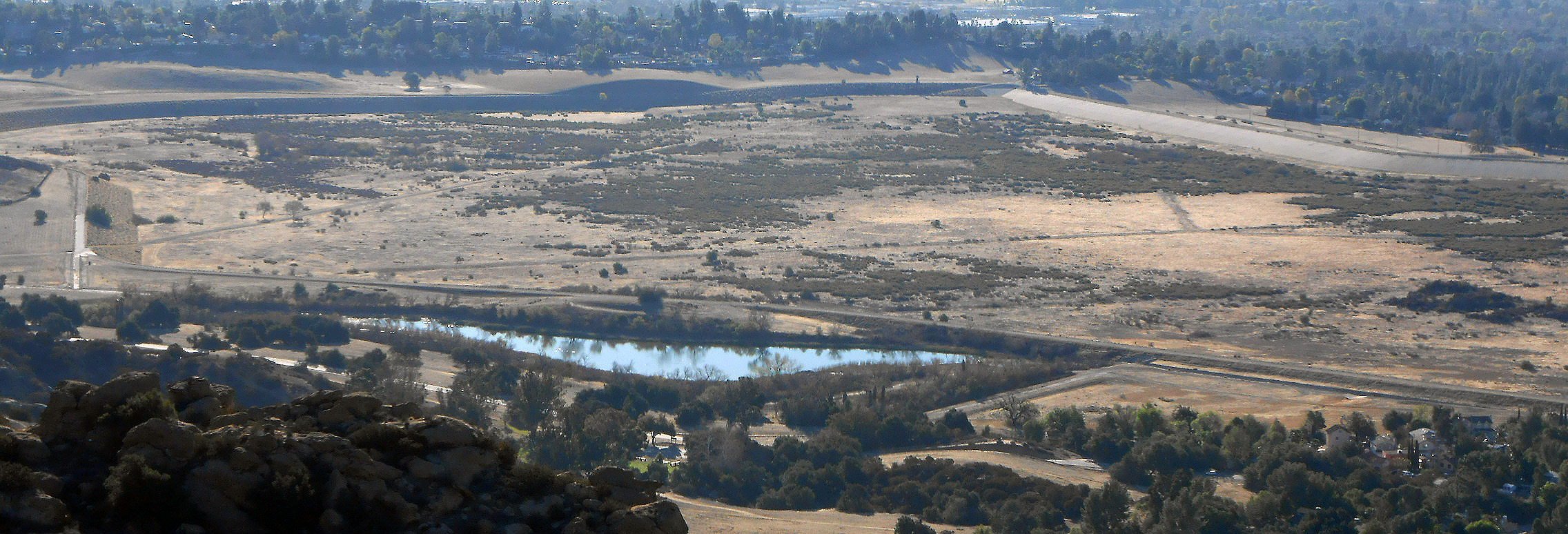
- Northern end of Chatsworth Nature Preserve, including Ecology Pond, as seen from Simi Hills cliffs overlooking Ventura Way
- Interactive map of Chatsworth Nature Preserve
- Location: San Fernando Valley, Los Angeles, California
- Coordinates: 34°13′56.6″N 118°37′43.2″W
- Area: 1,325 acres (536 ha)
- Established: 1994

The Chatsworth Nature Preserve (CNP) is a 1,325-acre (536 ha) open-space preserve located in the northwest corner of the San Fernando Valley in Los Angeles, California, United States. The preserve contains oak woodlands, savanna, riparian areas, grassland, vernal pools, and an Ecology Pond, all of which support more than 200 bird species and numerous mammals, amphibians and reptiles.

== Location ==
The CNP is located within Los Angeles city limits. The preserve's western edge abuts Los Angeles County's western border with Ventura County. The preserve is in the foothills of the Simi Hills. The following San Fernando Valley neighborhoods surround the preserve: Chatsworth, Chatsworth Lake Manor, and West Hills.

The preserve is located at the former site of Chatsworth Reservoir, a former Los Angeles Department of Water and Power (LADWP) water-storage reservoir. Nearby points of interest include Stoney Point, Santa Susana Pass State Historic Park, Santa Susana Field Laboratory, Burro Flats Painted Cave, and Minnie Hill Palmer House.

== Nature preserve designation ==
In the 1990s, former Los Angeles City Councilman Hal Bernson, other community leaders, and environmental organizations worked together to create the Chatsworth Nature Preserve. The Los Angeles City Council passed City Ordinance #169723 (the Chatsworth Open Space Ordinance) in 1994, limiting use of the area encompassing the former Chatsworth Reservoir property to a nature preserve and related scientific studies and education.

== Key features ==
=== Wildlife ===
More than 200 bird species inhabit the CNP. Resident bird species are greater roadrunner, California quail, woodpeckers, herons, egrets, orioles, ash-throated flycatchers, acorn woodpecker, Nuttall's woodpecker, western kingbird, great horned owl and others. Migratory birds include Canada goose, western meadowlark, tricolored blackbird, sapsuckers, and a variety of ducks and shorebirds. Raptors populating the preserve include ferruginous hawk, red-tailed hawk, prairie falcon, and many others. Notable amphibians and reptiles include western spadefoot toad, slender salamander, western skink, ring-necked snake, and red racer. The preserve's wildlife population includes large and small mammals: desert cottontail rabbit, gray fox, coyote, and raccoon, plus occasional bobcats, mountain lions, and mule deer.

=== Terrain ===
Among the CNP's various natural habitats are oak woodlands and savanna, riparian areas, chaparral, grassland, pond water and fringing marsh, seasonal ponds, and vernal pools created by seasonal rains and streams, including Woolsey Canyon Creek and Box Canyon Creek, which drain into the preserve from the steep rocky Simi Hills. Inside the preserve, the now-channelized Chatsworth Creek, a tributary of the Los Angeles River, joins with Box Canyon Creek, Woolsey Canyon Creek, and additional unnamed creeks. Rocky hills rise out of the preserve, and earthen berms from former water-retention dams arc across the terrain.

=== Ecology Pond ===
The CNP Ecology Pond provides the only permanent source of water within the preserve and draws wildlife from throughout the area. In recent history it has served as habitat for a variety of dabbling ducks, diving ducks, herons, egrets, grebes, coots, cormorants, and shorebirds. The pond is the core for a complex of habitats along its shores, including mudflats during lower water periods, a fringing marsh of cattails, bulrushes, nettles, and other water-associated plants. On slightly higher ground, the pond waters also support dense thickets primarily of mule fat and willows that could not exist in drier areas. The pond, mudflats and marsh provide foraging, roosting, and nest sites for numerous bird species, and are used by various mammals, reptiles and amphibians. The thickets support breeding bird species.

The Ecology Pond is also used as an emergency water supply source for fighting nearby wildfires. Fire department helicopters refill their water tanks with the pond's water.

=== Designated Historical Site ===
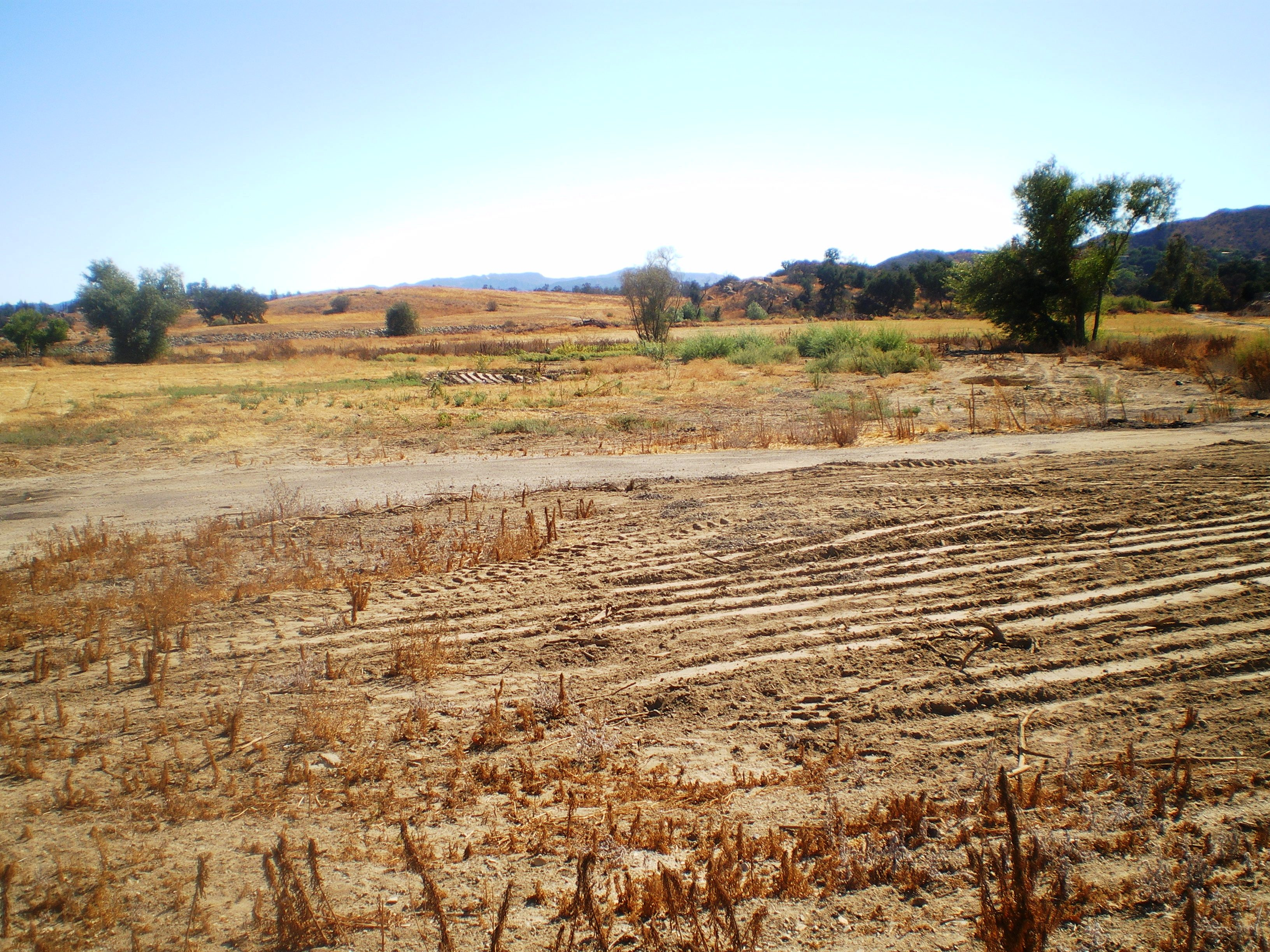
Chatsworth Reservoir Kiln Site

The CNP contains Los Angeles Historic-Cultural Monument #141, thus designated on April 2, 1975, by the Los Angeles Cultural Heritage Commission. Also known as the Chatsworth Calera, monument #141 is a centuries-old kiln used for burning limestone in the making of lime for concrete, mortar, and whitewash, a step in the construction of bricks and tiles. The monument now looks like a hole in the ground with walls of vitrified limestone and brick. It measures about fifteen feet deep and six and a half feet across. The kiln was in use during early California history (Spanish/Mission and Mexican periods). Rich in oak trees and lime deposits, the location was ideal for kiln operation. Several such lime kilns were in operation around the edge of the San Fernando Valley. The word "Calera" is Spanish for "limestone quarry" or "limekiln".

== Land management ==
The Los Angeles Department of Water and Power (LADWP) owns and manages the CNP. A chain-link fence encloses most of the preserve's grounds. The LADWP limits general public access to the enclosed portion of the CNP to a once-yearly Earth Day celebration.

== History ==
The CNP contains evidence of at least 1,000 years of human culture: native tribes made sacred use of the land, and the Fernandeño and Chumash people ground acorns and seeds in the sandstone outcroppings. Spanish missionaries processed limestone for use in plaster coatings of adobe buildings, and in the 19th century the land was used by Mexican cattle ranchers and Basque sheepherders.

=== Chatsworth Reservoir ===
In the early 20th century, the City of Los Angeles developed a linked chain of 19 water-retention basins to store and manage water imported via the Los Angeles Aqueduct system from the Owens Valley. Chatsworth Reservoir was the last of these, and occupied the now-current CNP lands.

Placed into service in 1919, the reservoir was created by two large earth-filled dams and two smaller dikes spanning gaps between hills. From 1920 to 1950 it was the main water storage facility for the western San Fernando Valley, primarily serving agricultural irrigation needs. During that period, dam improvements increased water capacity from the initial 7,400 acre-feet to 9,840 acre-feet. As the West San Fernando Valley shifted away from agriculture toward suburban housing, reservoir use shifted toward domestic water supply, requiring reservoir improvements to address water quality issues related to storm water runoff, algae and aquatic plant growth in shallow bays, and wind-propelled waves which stirred up mud. Construction related to these improvements began in the spring of 1969.

After the 1971 San Fernando earthquake, the California Department of Water Resources Division of Safety of Dams directed a stability investigation of all hydraulic-fill dams in California, including the Chatsworth Reservoir dams. The analysis determined that the Chatsworth dams would have to be completely rebuilt in order to be safe during a major earthquake. In 1972 the reservoir was drained and taken out of service. No schedule for reconstructing the Chatsworth Reservoir has been established.

=== Film history ===
The CNP was a popular filming location, as was true for several neighboring areas and ranches. The locale's rugged rock outcroppings, boulders, canyons, majestic oak trees, grasslands and lake featured prominently in "B" westerns. Movies filmed on the land now designated as the CNP include The Ten Commandments, Donovan's Brain, The Palomino, Susanna Pass, Sioux City Sue, Man from Rainbow Valley, Out California Way, Home on the Range, Hell's Angels, Tess of the Storm Country, Three Word Brand, and The Karate Kid. Television shows filmed there include The Adventures of Rin Tin Tin, Rin Tin Tin II, and The Dukes of Hazzard.

== See also ==
- Chatsworth Nature Preserve Coalition
