= Ryan Hoyt =

American murderer on death row

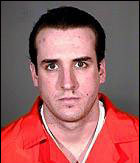
- Born: Ryan James Hoyt; August 10, 1979 (age 47); Los Angeles, California, U.S.
- Known for: Murder of Nicholas Markowitz
- Conviction: First degree murder with special circumstances
- Penalty: Death; commuted to life imprisonment without the possibility of parole

Ryan James Hoyt (born August 10, 1979) is a former associate of Jesse James Hollywood who was convicted of the murder of Nicholas Markowitz on August 9, 2000. He reportedly owed Hollywood money for drugs and was offered the opportunity to kill Markowitz as a way of erasing his debt.

During his trial, Hoyt took the stand and told the court he did not remember confessing to killing Markowitz. In November 2001, Hoyt was convicted of first-degree murder and was sentenced to death. In January 2024, Hoyt had his death sentence reduced to life in prison without parole.

In the film Alpha Dog, the character Elvis Schmidt was modeled after Hoyt. The role was played by actor Shawn Hatosy.

== Background ==
On August 6, 2000, 15-year-old Nicholas Markowitz was abducted by Jesse James Hollywood, Jesse Rugge and William Skidmore. Markowitz was held for three days in various locations around Santa Barbara for ransom until his older half-brother Ben Markowitz paid off a large debt he owed to Hollywood. Eventually, Hollywood ordered Markowitz to be killed after learning he could face life in prison for kidnapping and demanding ransom. Hoyt, who was also in debt to Hollywood, agreed to carry out the murder to erase his debt. After Markowitz was led into the Santa Ynez Mountains, Hoyt knocked Markowitz into a shallow grave dug earlier in the day before shooting him nine times with a TEC-9 handgun provided by Hollywood. Hoyt was arrested days later.

== Legal proceedings ==
After his arrest, Hoyt confessed to the murder in a videotaped confession with detectives. However, on November 9, 2001, Hoyt testified to jurors that he did not recall the interview or ever confessing to the crime. Hoyt stated that his only role in the crime was accidentally giving a duffel bag containing the handgun, which he believed to contain only marijuana, to Jesse Rugge. Michael Kania, a psychologist hired for Hoyt's defense, described him as "a man who's never really succeeded at anything" and said Hoyt had trouble finding a job and girlfriend, as well as untreated depression. Several other expert witnesses also stated Hoyt had a personality disorder with "avoidant" and "dependant" behavior. Deputy District Attorney Ron Zonen, who assisted with the production of Alpha Dog, called an expert psychiatric witness, who testified that Hoyt's complete memory loss of the murder and subsequent confession is very rare, and contrasted Hoyt's sharp recall of other events.

Hoyt's defense attorney Cheri Owen hoped to use Hoyt's youth, troubled family background, and lack of criminal record to persuade jurors, but in November 2001 Hoyt was convicted of first-degree murder, and the jury delivered a death sentence in February 2003. Superior court judge William L. Gordon stated that Hoyt refuted several chances to walk away from the crime before going through with the murder, and that “any feelings of sympathy for the defendant ... are substantially outweighed by the circumstances of the crime”. Hoyt remained on death row at San Quentin State Prison until January 2024 when his sentence was commuted to life imprisonment without the possibility of parole. Superior Court Judge Brian Hill granted Hoyt's motion to vacate the death sentence, indicating he was swayed that Hoyt's inexperienced attorney Owen was deficient during the penalty phase of the trial, and that he was a "youthful offender" with "mental deficits" that made execution inappropriate. Hoyt was subsequently transferred to the California Men's Colony in San Luis Obispo to serve his life sentence.

== See also ==
- List of death row inmates in the United States
