= West Hills, Los Angeles =

West Hills
- Neighborhood
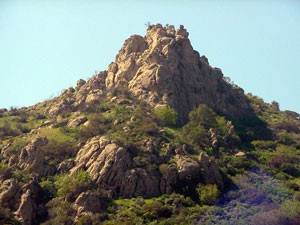
- Escorpión Peak (aka: Castle Peak; 1,475 feet/450 m)—east face view from West Hills

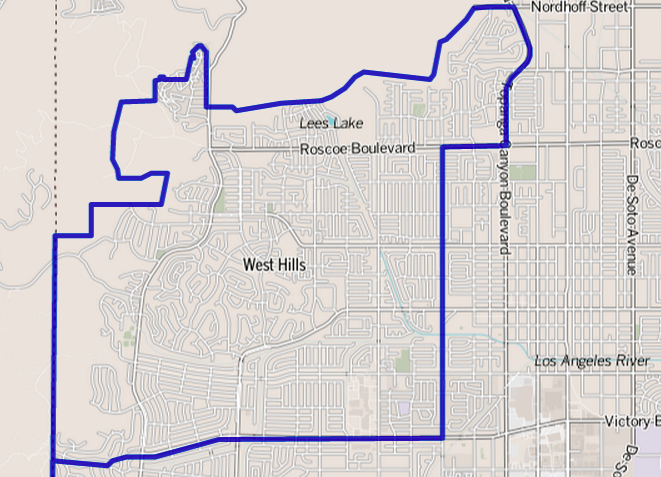
- West Hills as delineated by the Los Angeles Times

- Location within Los Angeles/San Fernando Valley
- Coordinates: 34°12′14″N 118°37′44″W 34°12′23″N 118°38′20″W
- Country: United States
- State: California
- County: Los Angeles
- City: Los Angeles
- Owensmouth: 1912
- Canoga Park: 1930
- West Hills: 1987

Area
  - Total: 8.5 sq mi (22 km^{2})
- Elevation: 899 ft (274 m)

Population (2022)
  - Total: 32,267
- Time zone: UTC−8 (PST)
  - Summer (DST): UTC−7 (PDT)
- ZIP Codes: 91304 & 91307
- Area code(s): 818 & 747

West Hills is a neighborhood in the western San Fernando Valley region of the city of Los Angeles, California. It is bordered by mountain ranges to the west and the Los Angeles neighborhoods of Chatsworth to the north, Canoga Park to the east, and Woodland Hills to the south.

The neighborhood was formerly the home of many Native American tribes, and during the early Spanish and Mexican era was part of the Mission San Fernando Rey de España. In the American era, West Hills was part of Owensmouth, which was renamed Canoga Park in 1930. Current-day Canoga Park and current-day West Hills were both known as Canoga Park. In 1987, the city of Los Angeles gave approval for the western portion of Canoga Park to split from the rest of Canoga Park, officially creating the neighborhood of West Hills.

Several city parks are to be found within West Hills. The area is highly residential; there are some religious establishments and a few commercial areas in the community. Two private high schools are among the 16 total schools within West Hills. High school students in West Hills who do not attend a private high school may typically attend the public high school in Canoga Park.

== Geography ==
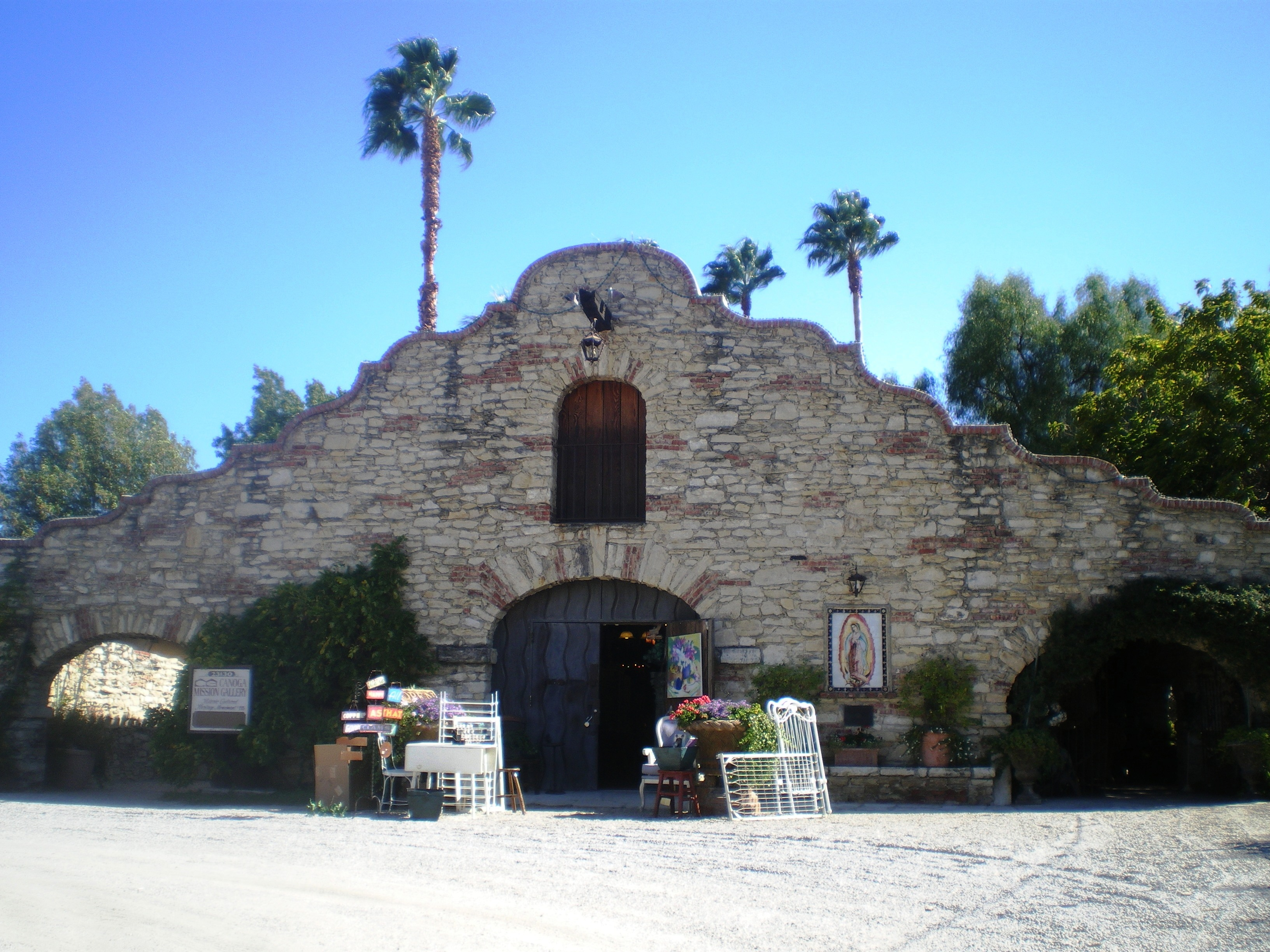
Canoga Mission Gallery

=== Location ===
West Hills (formerly joined with Canoga Park) is located in the western San Fernando Valley in Los Angeles County and about 45 minutes (depending on traffic) from downtown Los Angeles. It is off of U.S. 101 (the Ventura Freeway) via the Valley Circle Boulevard/Mullholland Highway off-ramp.

==== Mapping L.A. ====
According to the 2008 Mapping L.A. project of the Los Angeles Times, West Hills is flanked on the north by the Chatsworth Reservoir, on the east by Canoga Park, on the south by Woodland Hills, on the southwest by Hidden Hills and on the west by Bell Canyon in Ventura County.

==== Neighborhood Council boundaries ====
In 1987, Los Angeles recognized the following description of the boundaries of West Hills Neighborhood Council:

Starting at the centerline intersections of Topanga Canyon Boulevard and Nordhoff Street, westward down the centerline of Nordhoff extended in a straight line to the city limits of the City of Los Angeles; thence southward, following the border of the City of Los Angeles to the centerline of Victory Boulevard; thence eastward down the centerline of Victory Boulevard to Shoup Avenue centerline; thence northward down the centerline of Shoup Avenue to the intersection of the centerline of Roscoe Boulevard; thence eastward down the centerline of Roscoe Boulevard to the centerline of Topanga Canyon Boulevard; then northward down the centerline of Topanga Canyon Boulevard to the centerline of Nordhoff Street.

=== Water resources ===
Bell and Dayton creeks in West Hills are several of the headwaters of the Los Angeles River that originate in the Northwest San Fernando Valley. The Los Angeles River itself begins at the confluence of Arroyo Calabasas (Calabasas Creek) and Bell Creek in Canoga Park. These and other small creeks supply stormwater and suburban runoff water to the Los Angeles River, and several are considered year-round creeks. Although the creeks are now channeled and run within concrete walls, they do form a significant urban wildlife landscape and contribute to the population of indigenous wildlife left within the San Fernando Valley.

Both Bell Creek and Dayton Creek in particular have received attention due to their headwaters origins inside the Santa Susana Field Laboratory in the Simi Hills. The SSFL is mandated for an environmental cleanup due to its uses as a testing center for rocket and missile engines, nuclear reactor research and fuel reprocessing, and high technology defense systems. It was also the site of a partial nuclear core meltdown in 1959. Prominent contaminants include radionuclides, VOCs-volatile organic compounds, Chromium, Lead, Benzene, and other components of rocket engine fuel and cleaning compounds.

=== Climate ===
This region experiences warm and dry summers, with average temperatures peaking at 96 °F (36 °C) highs throughout August. West Hills has a climate similar to other locations in the west San Fernando Valley, such as nearby Woodland Hills with a long-established weather station at Pierce College. According to the Köppen Climate Classification system, West Hills has a warm-summer Mediterranean climate, abbreviated Csa on climate maps.

== Demographics ==
=== 2022 ===
As of 2022, according to the Los Angeles Almanac there were estimated to be 32,267 residents of West Hills. The ethnic breakdown was 60.52% White (non-Hispanic), 15.73% Asian, 4.56% Black, 0.75% Native American, 0.05% Pacific Islander, 3.52% from other races, and 11.25% from two or more races. 12.15% were Hispanic or Latino of any race.

=== 2010 ===
As of the 2010 census, and according to the Los Angeles Almanac, there were 38,814 people and 10,626 households residing in West Hills. The ethnic-racial medley of the neighborhood was 78.89% White, 11.97% Asian, 0.05% Pacific Islander, 2.11% African American, 0.36% Native American, 2.80% from other races, and 3.82% from two or more races; 9.26% of the population were Hispanic of any race.

=== 2000 ===
The Los Angeles Times reported that the 2000 U.S. census counted 30,814 residents in the 8.53-square-mile (22.1 km^{2}) West Hills neighborhood—or 4,551 inhabitants per square mile (1,757/km^{2}), among the lowest population densities in Los Angeles, which itself has an overall lower population density.

In 2000, the median age for residents was 39, considered old for city and county neighborhoods; the percentages of residents aged 35 and older were among the county's highest.

The neighborhood was considered "moderately diverse" ethnically within Los Angeles, with a high percentage of white residents. The breakdown was whites, 70.9%; Latinos, 11%; Asians, 11.3%; blacks, 2.5%; and others, 4.3%. Iran (13.8%) and the Philippines (8.4%) were the most common places of birth for the 22.7% of the residents who were born abroad—a low percentage for Los Angeles.

The median yearly household income in 2008 dollars was $103,008, considered high for the city and county. The percentage of households that earned $125,000 or more was high for Los Angeles County. Renters occupied 12.6% of the housing stock, and house and condominium-owners occupied 87.4%.

The percentages of married people were among the county's highest. In 2000, there were 785 families headed by single parents, a low percentage for both the city and the county.

Eleven percent of the population were military veterans, a high rate for the city and the county, and the percentages of veterans who served during World War II or the Korean War were among the county's highest.

=== 1980 ===
The 1980 census showed 32,370 people living in the area that later became West Hills, of whom 92% were white, 7% Hispanic, 1% black, 4% Asian and 3% other. Families constituted 90% of the population, and 72% of the residents owned or were buying their own homes. Fifty-three percent had attended college.

== History ==
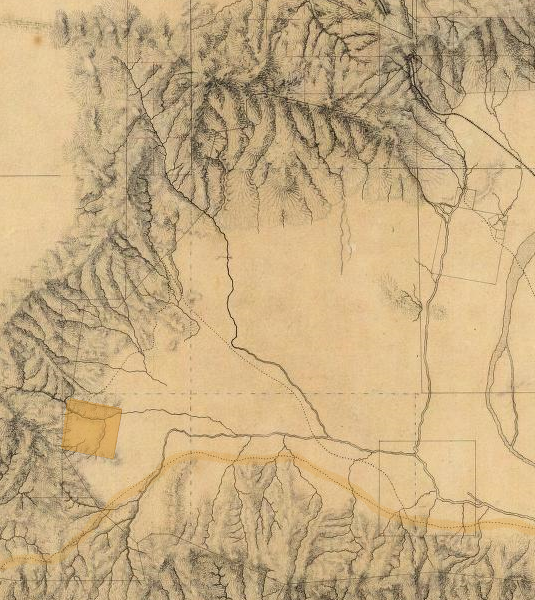
Detail of the southwestern San Fernando Valley, from an 1880 manuscript map of Los Angeles and San Bernardino topography, showing Rancho El Escorpión (shaded area)

=== Pre-Spanish contact history ===
The present day West Hills area was the homeland of Native Americans in the Tongva-Fernandeño and Chumash-Ventureño tribes, that lived in the Simi Hills and close to Bell Creek and other local tributaries to the Los Angeles River. Native American civilizations had inhabited the San Fernando Valley for an estimated 8,000 years. The village, Hu'wam, of the Chumash-Venturaños, was located at the base of Escorpión Peak (Castle Peak) near present-day Bell Canyon Park. It was a meeting and trading point for them with the Tongva-Fernandeño and Tataviam-Fernandeño people. A cave near Hu'wam, known as the Cave of Munits, is the believed home of a mythical Chumash shaman named Munits, who was killed by an eagle after murdering the son of a Chumash chief. Escorpión Peak is one of nine alignment points in the ancestral Chumash homelands, believed essential to maintaining the balance of the natural world.

=== Spanish and Mexican history ===
From 1797 to 1846, the area (future West Hills) was part of Mission San Fernando Rey de España (Mission San Fernando). After Mexico won independence from Spain, it later became part of Rancho Ex-Mission San Fernando in Alta California. In 1845, a separate land grant for Rancho El Escorpión was issued by Governor Pío Pico to three Chumash people: Odón Eusebia, Urbano, and Urbano's son Mañuel. It encompassed the land west of present-day Woodlake Avenue in West Hills, with its adobe ranch buildings (present 1840s—1960s) sited beside Bell Creek near present-day Bell Canyon Park.

=== American history ===
==== Land grants ====
California was admitted to the United States in 1850, with Spanish and Mexican land grants requiring a federal land patent to retain ownership. The United States Public Land Commission patented the Rancho to original grantees Odón Eusebia, Urbano, and Mañuel in 1876. In 1912 the Chumash heirs sold Rancho El Escorpión to George Platt. He established a dairy operation on renamed Platt Ranch variously called Ferndale, "escorpion," or Cloverdale Dairy. The Rancho El Escorpión-Platt Ranch was not incorporated into Los Angeles and its water system until 1958 and was left undeveloped until 1961.

==== Separation from Canoga Park ====
West Hills was originally part of Owensmouth (founded 1912) and renamed Canoga Park (1931).

There's a community identity that didn't previously exist, a forum for people to be involved in community affairs.

— Joel Schiffman, West Hills Property Owners Association

Under the leadership of Joel Schiffman, residents of a three-square-mile area in western Canoga Park began a petition campaign in 1987 to separate from the larger community and establish a neighborhood of their own to be called West Hills, the same name that a 303-home subdivision in a nearby unincorporated area had carried for years. The Los Angeles city district of 4,700 single-family homes and 35 businesses would be bounded by Roscoe Boulevard on the north, Woodlake Avenue, Sherman Way and Platt Avenue on the east, Victory Boulevard on the south and the county line on the west. Proponents said the change would give the area "political clout" and increase property values. The drive, which was opposed by the Canoga Park Chamber of Commerce, was partially financed by a real estate firm, whose owner, Lynn Garvanian, said the name change would "add 5% to the value of homes." The campaign was quickly criticized as "snobby and greedy" by members of the Canoga Park Chamber of Commerce but defended by supporters who said it would allow the neighborhood to preserve its residential character. Petition leaders said they hoped a new name would separate the more affluent West Hills area from Canoga Park's "fading factories, aging subdivisions and X-rated bars and theaters."

They're looking for the betterment of a community by renaming it. There's no magic in words.

— William F. Vietinghoff,
Canoga Park Chamber of Commerce

As the petition drive expanded to include three more areas—two on the edge of the Chatsworth Reservoir and one on the western edge of Canoga Park—the Canoga Park Chamber of Commerce took an official stand against the separation, with president William Vietinghoff calling it "a source of division and disharmony ... an extremely dangerous precedent for the whole San Fernando Valley." Council member Hal Bernson, however, said he did not "look at it as a slam against Canoga Park—just as a group of people wanting identity."

On January 16, 1987, Councilwoman Joy Picus accepted petitions representing 3,364, or 77% of the 4,333 households in the area within her councilmanic district, and she immediately said she would direct the city's transportation department to put up boundary signs as the residents requested. Many of the latter expected the name change to add thousands of dollars of value to their properties. Two weeks later Picus added another two-mile-wide section of Canoga Park that gave West Hills the Fallbrook Mall and Platt Village shopping centers, along with several smaller retail strips and some older residential tracts built in flatland areas. This addition was denounced by Schiffman, who said it did "a lot to erode the community identity we sought."

...no further petitions. I didn't know this was going to grow. I just want this to go away.

— Joy Picus,
City Council member

In what was called a "stampede," other areas sought entry into West Hills, one homeowner on Santa Susana Place saying residents there wanted to "divorce ourselves from Canoga Park's element." Council member Hal Bernson agreed to add a square-mile area with 423 households bounded by Roscoe Boulevard on the south, Parthenia Street on the north, Shoup Avenue on the west and Topanga Canyon Boulevard on the east, although the commercial northwest corner of Roscoe and Topanga Canyon boulevards was to remain in Canoga Park. Those additions meant that from nearly a third to nearly half of the former Canoga Park was to be part of the new West Hills.

Still, a demand continued for admittance to West Hills. A community meeting scheduled for August 31, 1987, had to be repeated later the same evening when some four hundred people packed a meeting room at the Fallbrook Mall to wrestle with the decision on where the final boundary should be. The later event drew three hundred. A poll was taken among about 8,500 residents in an area between Topanga Canyon Boulevard and the recently adopted West Hills border at Woodlake and Platt avenues to choose an eastern border. More than a hundred protestors gathered in front of Picus's office to protest any enlargement of West Hills, chanting "Hell, no, we won't grow!" But other residents wound through the area in car caravans, shouting from megaphones and waving signs urging "Vote to Fallbrook." In the end, Picus made a controversial decision to move the eastern boundary of West Hills from Platt and Woodlake avenues to Shoup Avenue, a decision that did not please everybody.

In 1994, the Canoga Park and West Hills communities achieved a "partial rapprochement" when business leaders voted to form a united Canoga Park/West Hills Chamber of Commerce, which is still in existence.

== Parks and landmarks ==
Three ranches and a silent film star's estate in West Hills have been awarded Los Angeles Historic-Cultural Monument status recognition and protection, and two are city parks. In addition, on the western edge of West Hills huge open space preserves provide an undeveloped greenbelt and nearby recreation opportunities. The high number of neighborhood parks here offer sports fields and courts, play areas for children, and community rooms.

=== Landmarks ===
==== Orcutt Ranch ====
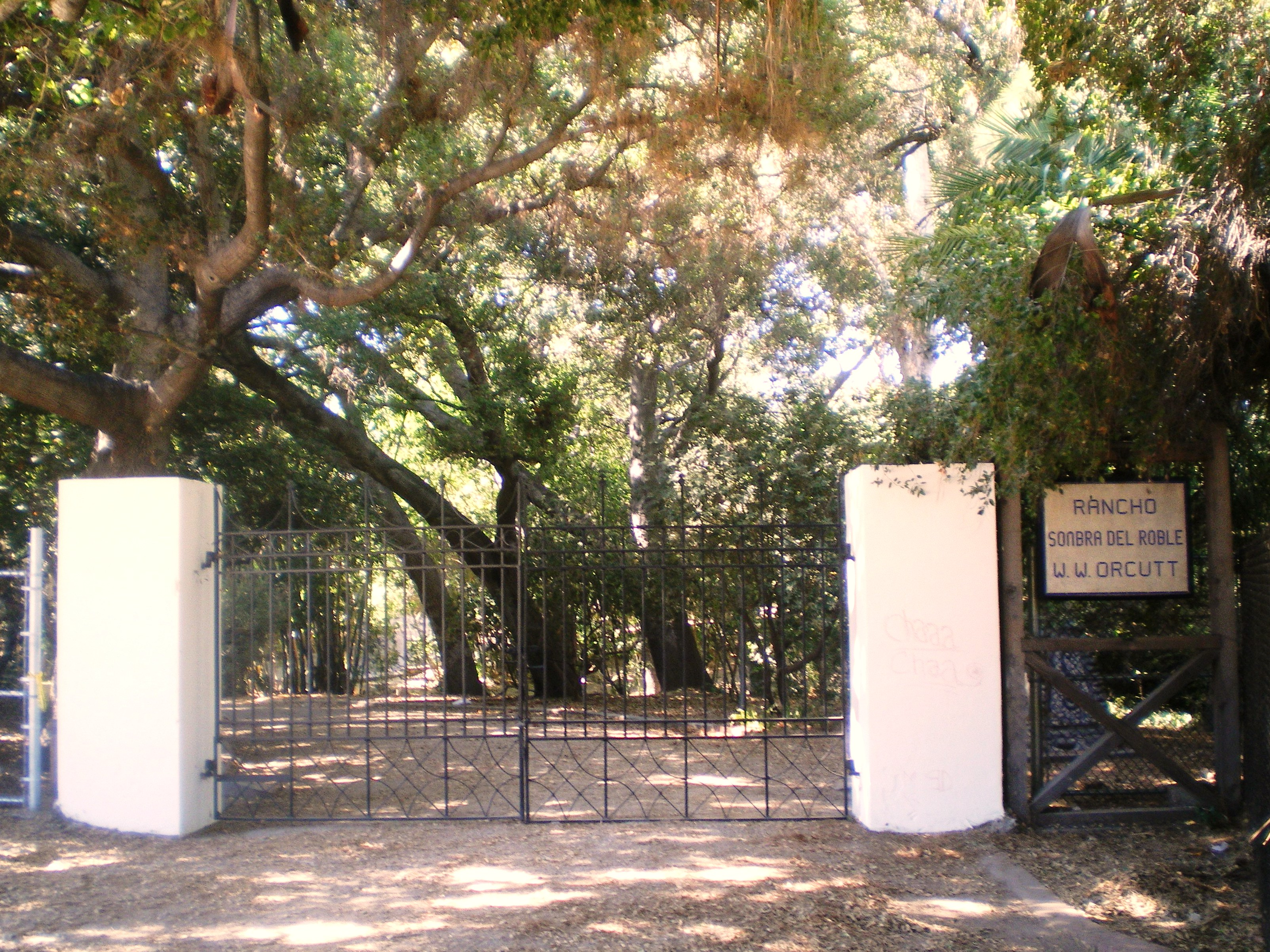
Orcutt Ranch native oaks and entry gates

- Orcutt Ranch Estate, ("Rancho Sombra del Roble") to the Orcutts, is the 1920 adobe residence, gardens, and citrus orchards of William Warren Orcutt, an early Union Oil Company executive. The park has an entry through craftsman style stone gates to a parking area with natural habitat landscaping on Roscoe Boulevard near Valley Circle Boulevard. The park, now named the Orcutt Ranch Horticulture Center, offers: self-guided strolling, exploring and scheduled house tours; public community gardens; annual public citrus harvests; and garden wedding and special event facilities. Orcutt Ranch is a registered-protected Los Angeles Historic-Cultural Monument.

==== Shadow Ranch ====
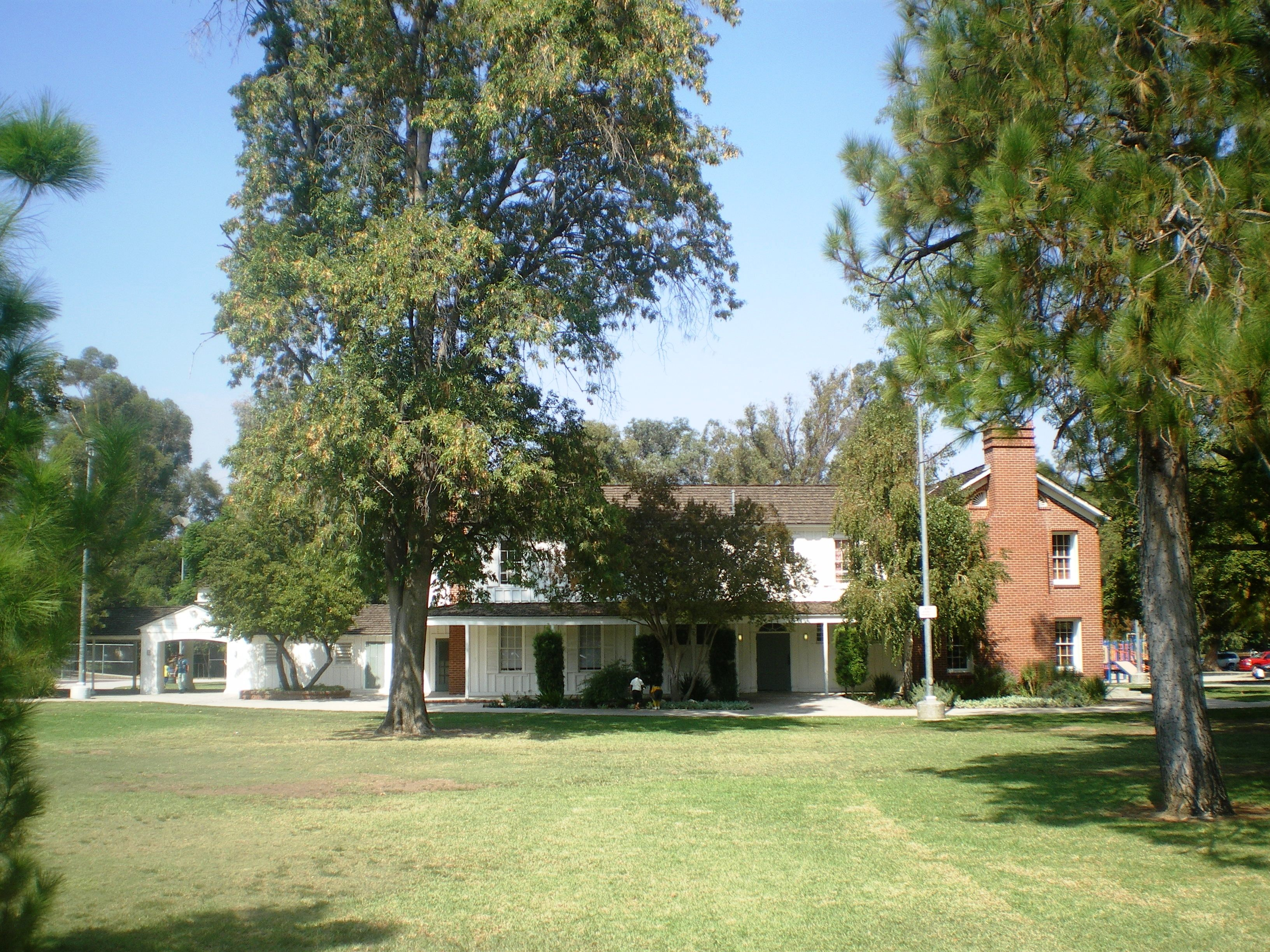
Shadow Ranch ranch-house and Park

- Shadow Ranch Park, formerly the Workman Ranch, on Vanowen Street just east of Fallbrook Avenue. Alfred Workman was a muleskinner who emigrated from Australia, winding up running a massive wheat farm owned by a syndicate led by Isaac Lankershim and Isaac Van Nuys. He bought the ranch in 1869, and from then to 1872, Workman built a home for his wife, Henrietta Feliz, and himself by adding onto an existing adobe. The Australian had eucalyptus trees imported and planted on the ranch, and some folks claim all the eucalyptus trees in California stem from Workman Ranch. Workman Ranch was acquired by a married, screenwriting couple, Colin Clements and Florence Ryerson (the latter co-wrote the screenplay for The Wizard of Oz while living here). She renamed the estate Shadow Ranch for the amount of shade provided by the numerous eucalyptus trees planted by Workman decades ago. William Wyler's movie The Children's Hour, based on the play by Lillian Hellman, was filmed here in 1961. Shadow Ranch Park is an L.A. City Park with lighted basketball courts, a children's play area, football and soccer fields, meeting and community rooms, a baseball diamond, and picnic tables. Organized youth sports are also offered at this registered-protected Los Angeles Historic-Cultural Monument

=== Open-space parks ===
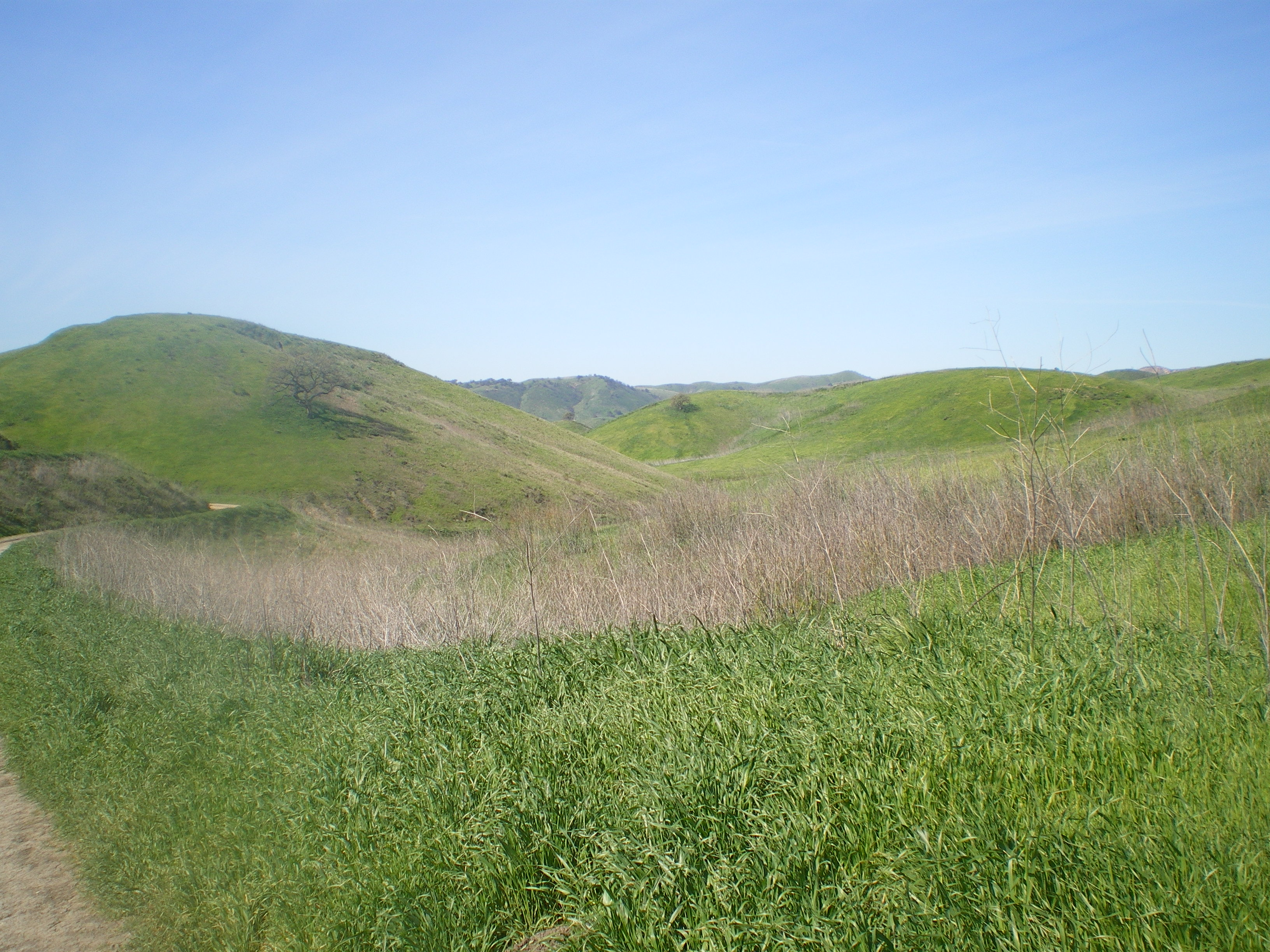
Rolling hills at Upper Las Virgenes Canyon

All of these large Parks are open for walks, hiking, mountain biking, and equestrian riding; sunrise to sunset.

- El Escorpión Park: The area landmark El Escorpión Peak centered in the park offers hikes with impressive views of the Valley. The trailhead and parking are at the western end of Vanowen Boulevard, west of Valley Circle Boulevard (Castle Peak Park).
- Bell Canyon Park is directly adjacent on the northwest of El Escorpión Park, with trails along natural Bell Creek and up the north side of the Peak. The trailheads and parking are off Bell Canyon Boulevard just before the 'Bell Canyon community' gatehouse, west of Valley Circle Boulevard. Pedestrian access follows up the creek past the gated road to later loop around the Peak to El Escorpión Park.
- Upper Las Virgenes Canyon Open Space Preserve parking and trailheads are at the western end of Victory Boulevard, west of Valley Circle Boulevard. Trails cross the huge natural park and connect west to adjoining Cheseboro-Palo Comado Canyon Park section of the Santa Monica Mountains National Recreation Area, north to El Escorpión and Bell Canyon Parks, and south to Hidden Hills, creating a generous greenbelt for West Hills. There are also scheduled evening moonlight hikes, and daytime events.
- Roscoe/Valley Circle Park is a rustic linear open space park with panoramic views and an equestrian trail, west of Valley Circle Boulevard, with access at Roscoe Boulevard, at West Stagg Street, and at Quiet Hills Court.

=== Neighborhood parks ===
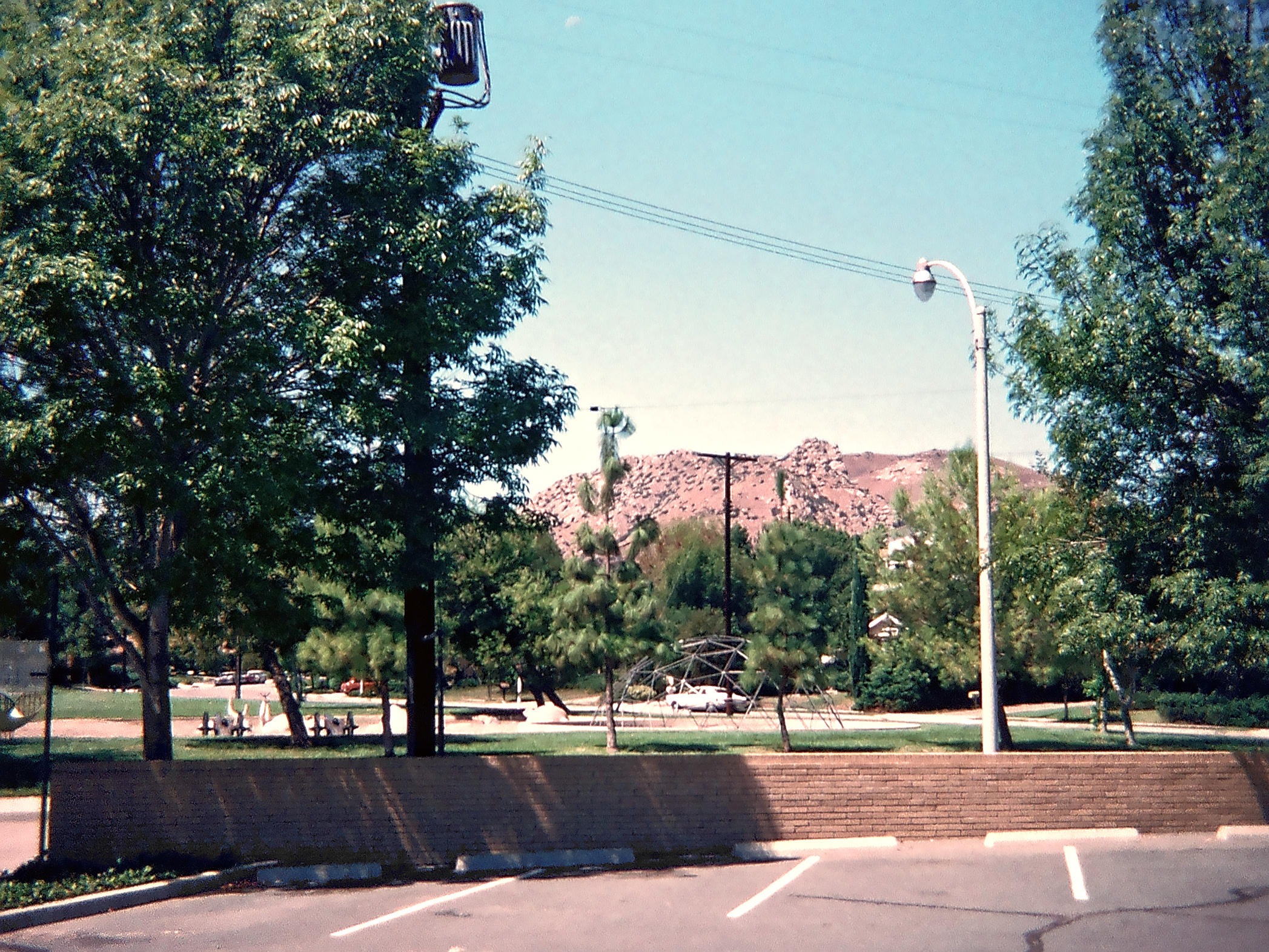
Mae Boyar Recreation Center and Castle Peak as seen from Highlander Road School, 1978

- Knapp Ranch Park has two sections: Kittridge Street east section offers these outdoor unlighted sports facilities: baseball diamond, basketball courts, a children's play area, picnic tables, and tennis courts; Wooded Vista and Twisted Oak Drive west section offers walks, a picnic area, and panoramic views.
- The West Hills Sports Center/Adam Bischoff Soccer Fields has a pocket park, recreation center, and soccer fields. It is on the west side of Valley Circle Blvd. near Vanowen.
- Mae Boyar Recreation Center has basketball courts and a playground, on Highlander Rd.
- Taxco Trails Park is a pocket park, with a children's play area and picnic tables on Platt Ave. and Saticoy.
- Lazy J Ranch is a pocket park, with a children's play area on Valley Circle Blvd.
- Chase Park has a children's play area and picnic tables.
- Hidden Lake Park, a neighborhood park at Lees Lake, Sedan Ave. off Roscoe Boulevard, directions at gate.
- Castle Peak Park is a children's play area and small neighborhood open space park for picnics on Valley Circle Blvd., (not to be confused with El Escorpión [Peak] Park).
- Four Oaks Park is a neighborhood pocket park, with a children's play area and picnic tables, on Cohasset and Melba Ave.

=== Other historic-cultural landmarks ===
==== Francis Lederer Estate ====
The Lederer Estate, which was owned by stage actor and early film star Francis Lederer (1899–2000), has two separate structures and their settings that are each a registered Los Angeles Historic-Cultural Monument—LAHCM. These are: the former residence and its outdoor patio rooms, gardens, and grounds; and the equestrian stables and its patios. Lederer was the honorary Mayor of Canoga Park (pre-West Hills) for many years. In retirement he taught theatre classes, and was a member of the L.A. City Parks Board of Directors. The landmark buildings are located west of and near the West Hills Post Office and West Hills Hospital.

- Francis Lederer Residence: LAHCM No. 204, a very distinguished residential example of the Mediterranean Revival, Spanish Colonial Revival, and Mission Revival styles of architecture integrated together, with the interior and exterior design and artisan detailing of museum quality. The house was begun in 1934 and constructed over a period of years, with artisan builder John R. Litke, by Lederer on his then 300-acre Canoga Park ranch. It sits atop a hill overlooking the Valley and surrounding mountains.
  The exterior walls use stone quarried from the site. The residence wraps around a large central courtyard with a fountain and outdoor fireplace, and the various rooms opening onto it. The materials were chosen with care and painstakingly employed in such a manner as to make the resulting structure appear very old. The imported Spanish and Italian furnishings and artworks are of particular interest, dating from the 14th to 19th centuries. The estate's residence was to become a public museum housing the Canoga-Owensmouth Historical Society, a community arts center, and its gardens and open space a city park; however it is currently for sale by the heirs (2013).
- Francis Lederer Stables: LAHCM No. 135, designed and built in a rustic and authentic Mission Revival architectural style. It was also designed by Francis Lederer and John R. Litke in 1936 and used locally quarried stones. It was originally on the natural bank of free-flowing Bell Creek, before its channelization in the late 1950s. Through Mrs. Lederer's efforts in the 1970s, the stables opened to the community as the Canoga Mission Gallery—now the Hidden Chateau event venue, on western Sherman Way.

==== Peppergate Ranch ====
The 29-acre (120,000 m^{2}) Peppergate Ranch was located between Orcutt Ranch and Chatsworth Reservoir. The ranch's residence was designed by master architect Paul R. Williams (1894–1980) in the Ranch Style. It was built in 1939 for Talton R. Craig, founder of the Craig Movie Supply Company. The T.R. Craig Residence is a Los Angeles Historic-Cultural Monument (#992; in 2011), located on Pinelake Drive. Peppergate Ranch was subdivided, as Woodlake Estates and Pinelake Estates, in the 1960s.

== Government representation and services ==
=== City of Los Angeles ===
West Hills, made up of what was formerly the western section of the Canoga Park neighborhood, is represented by Los Angeles city council member John Lee. West Hills borders the Los Angeles neighborhoods of Chatsworth, Canoga Park, and Woodland Hills, as well as the city of Hidden Hills, all located within the San Fernando Valley.

==== Police and fire ====
- Los Angeles Police Department: West Hills is served by the LAPD Topanga Community Station, located in adjacent Canoga Park.
  The LAPD named the station after a historical village of the local Tongva—Fernandeño Native American tribe, using a westernized version of its Tongva language name. It was originally to be named the Northwest Station, however local residents preferred a name reflecting the region's history. The new complex opened at 21501 Schoenborn Street (91304) in 2008.
- Los Angeles Fire Department: West Hills is served by LAFD Station 106 in West Hills, and LAFD Station 105 in Woodland Hills (Fallbrook and Victory).

==== Public library ====
The Los Angeles Public Library operates the Platt Branch Library at 23600 Victory Boulevard. In 2015, the Neighborhood Councils of West Hills and Woodland Hills-Warner Center agreed to share jurisdiction over the library and its grounds, making it a part of both West Hills and Woodland Hills.

==== West Hills Neighborhood Council ====
The West Hills Neighborhood Council (WHNC) has a website, public meetings, and sponsors events and activities. It is governed by a 25-member board of directors that is elected by West Hills stakeholders (residents and local business owners). The council also is a resource as the city's official forum for individuals and the community to learn about, discuss and take positions on local and citywide issues.

=== Federal ===
==== Representation ====
- West Hills is represented in the United States Senate by California's Senators Laphonza Butler and Alex Padilla.
- West Hills is within the 32nd Congressional district — represented by U.S. Representative Brad Sherman.

==== U.S. Postal Service ====
The United States Postal Service: The West Hills Post Office is located at 23055 Sherman Way, West Hills, 91307 (where Platt turns into Sherman Way). The community's ZIP Codes are 91307 and 91304.

=== State ===
West Hills is within the:

- 27th State Senate district—represented by State Senator Henry Stern
- 46th State Assembly district: represented by Assemblymember Jesse Gabriel

=== Los Angeles County ===
West Hills is located in Los Angeles County and is represented by Lindsey Horvath.

=== Los Angeles City ===
- Los Angeles City Council District 12, represented by John Lee.

=== Los Angeles Unified School District ===
- Los Angeles Unified School District (LAUSD), Board of Education District 3, represented by Scott Schmerelson.

== Hospitals ==
The UCLA Health West Valley Medical Center, located at Medical Center Drive and Sherman Way, serves the local community as well as patients from several cities in Los Angeles and Ventura Counties. The West Hills Hospital Surgical Center opened in 1996, and performs procedures in specialties such as general and hand surgery (done by The Hand Center of Southern California), gynecology, gastroenterology, and orthopedics. The UCLA Health West Valley Medical Center facilities also include a large maternity ward and an oncology unit. The Grossman Burn Centers, formerly based at Sherman Oaks Hospital, moved to West Hills Hospital in 2010. Opened in 1984, the hospital does not have a trauma center so any trauma/emergency cases are routed to nearby Northridge Hospital Medical Center.

== Education ==
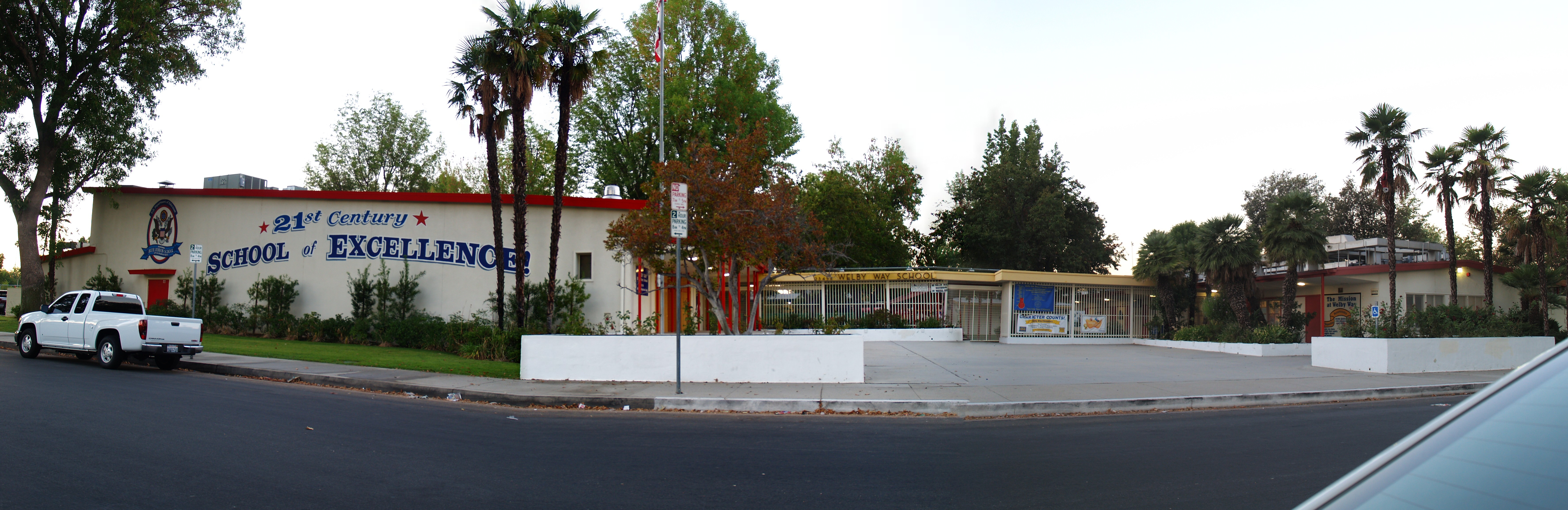
Welby Way Elementary School

Thirty-eight percent of West Hills residents aged 25 and older had earned a four-year degree by 2000, a high percentage for both the city and the county. The percentages of those residents with a master's degree or higher was also high for the county.

=== Schools ===
Schools within the West Hills boundaries are:

==== Public ====
The Los Angeles Unified School District operates public schools in this area.

- Capistrano Avenue Elementary School, 8118 Capistrano Avenue
- Enadia Way Elementary School (Enadia Technology Enriched Charter School), 22944 Enadia Way
- Hamlin Street Elementary School (Hamlin Charter Academy), 22627 Hamlin Street
- Haynes Elementary School, 6624 Lockhurst Drive
- Justice Street Elementary School, 23350 Justice Street
- Nevada Avenue Elementary School, 22120 Chase Street
- Pomelo Drive Elementary School, 7633 March Avenue
- Welby Way Elementary School, 23456 Welby Way

==== Private ====
- de Toledo High School (formerly New Community Jewish High School), 22622 Vanowen Street
- Chaminade College Preparatory, high school, 7500 Chaminade Avenue
- Parkhill School, 7401 Shoup Avenue
- Crane Academy of Excellence, K-12, 23119 Vose Street
- Kadima Day School, 7011 Shoup Avenue
- Hill Point Montessori Preparatory School, 6601 Valley Circle Blvd.
- Shepherd of the Valley Lutheran, preschool, 23838 Kittridge Street
- West Valley Christian School, 22450 Sherman Way

==== Adjacent public schools ====
Public middle schools and high schools serving West Hills within their district boundary lines include:

- Hale Middle School—George Ellery Hale Charter Academy (Woodland Hills)
- Christopher Columbus Middle School (Canoga Park)
- Canoga Park Senior High School (Canoga Park)
- Chatsworth Senior High School—Chatsworth Charter High School (Chatsworth)
- El Camino Real Senior High School—El Camino Real Charter High School (Woodland Hills)
- Ivy Academia Entrepreneurial Charter School Tk-6 (Woodland Hills)

== Other community features ==
Among religious buildings, Our Lady of the Valley Catholic Church, Saint Bernardine Parish and the Hamakom Synagogue is located near Stone Gate Drive and Valley Circle Boulevard. Chabad of West Hills is located near the intersection of Hartland Street and Valley Circle Boulevard. Hamakom (synagogue) is a Conservative synagogue, is located in West Hills. It was formed in 2023 through the merger of Shomrei Torah Synagogue and Temple Aliyah.

The Corporate Pointe business park, on the largest research and light industry property in West Hills, is in planning for redevelopment. It is located at Fallbrook Avenue and Roscoe Boulevard, near Hidden Lake and the Chatsworth Reservoir. The property was originally developed in 1959 as the Thompson-Ramo-Wooldridge aerospace corporation's new headquarters. It was later used by Atomics International, Hughes Aircraft, and Raytheon for aerospace development advancements and nuclear research.

=== Public transport ===
Public transport within West Hills and the San Fernando Valley is provided by Metro Local bus routes, operated by the Los Angeles County Metropolitan Transportation Authority (Metro). They connect to transfer points and hubs in adjacent Woodland Hills, Canoga Park, and Chatsworth for other public transport systems and destinations.

Metro Local routes serving West Hills include: 162/163 via Sherman Way, 164 via Victory Boulevard, 165 via Vanowen Street, 169 via Saticoy Street, and 152/353 via Fallbrook Avenue and Roscoe Boulevard.

==== G Line ====
Metro Local buses connect with the G Line at nearby stations to the east in Canoga Park, including Canoga station, Sherman Way station, and Roscoe station. The southeastbound Orange Line connects to the North Hollywood Metro Station for the B Line subway to Downtown Los Angeles and beyond. The northbound Orange Line connects to the Chatsworth Transportation Center, a hub for: the Amtrak Pacific Surfliner trains; the Metrolink Ventura County Line trains; and the buses of the Los Angeles Department of Transportation (LADOT) Downtown Commuter Express, Simi Valley Transit, and Santa Clarita Transit.

== Notable people ==
- Blake Gailen (born 1985), American-Israeli baseball player
- Jesse James Hollywood, convicted of kidnapping and murder
- Miguel Leonis, 19th century owner of Rancho El Escorpión
- Nicholas Markowitz, victim in Jesse James Hollywood kidnapping-murder case
- Daniella Monet (born 1989) actress, entrepreneur and television personality.
- Kevin Pillar, major league baseball outfielder
- Ramona Shelburne (born 1979), sportswriter and softball player

== See also ==
- Burro Flats Painted Cave
- History of the San Fernando Valley to 1915
- Owensmouth Line
- Rancho El Escorpión
- Rock art of the Chumash people
