= Shadow Ranch =

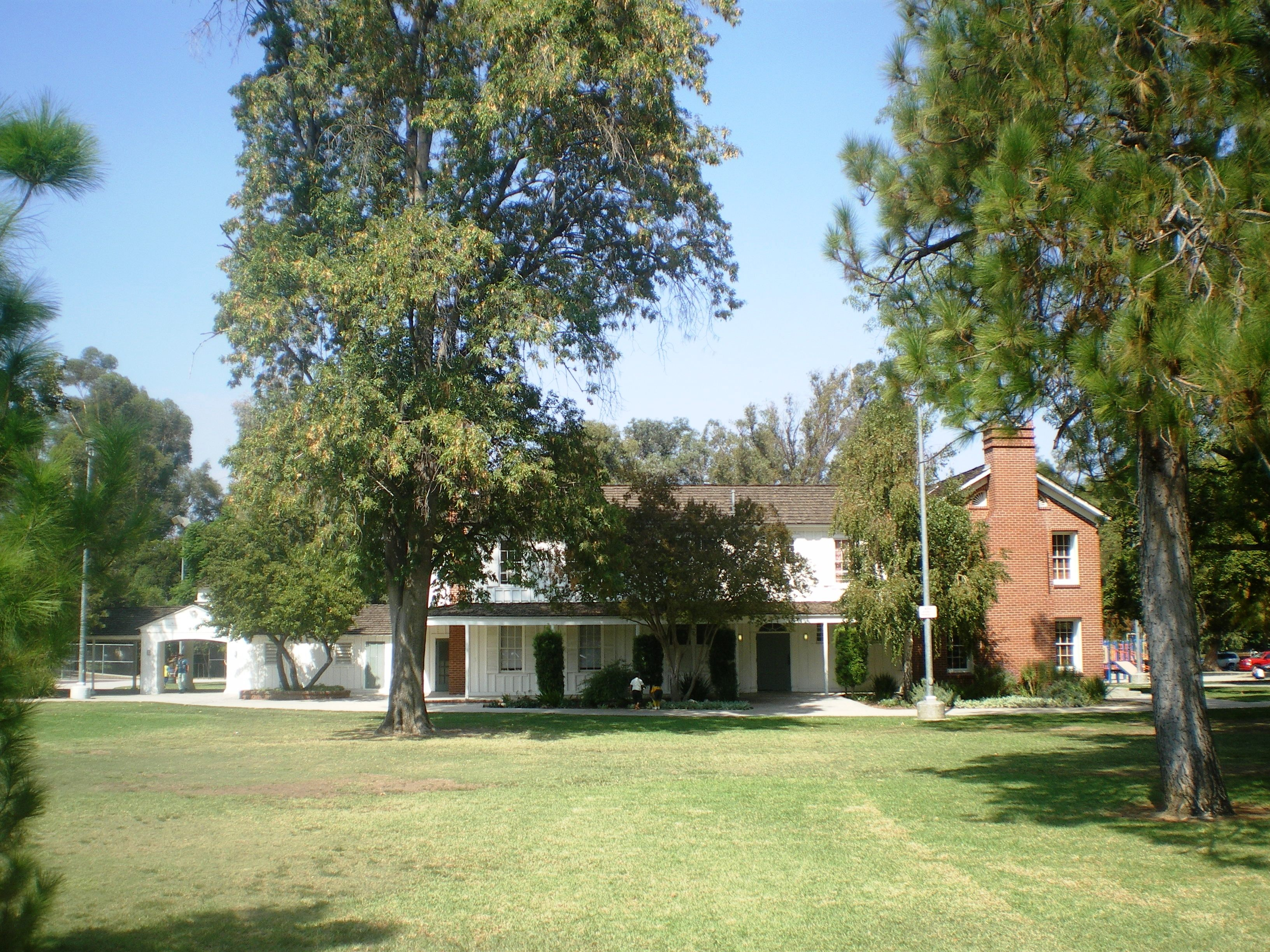
- Shadow Ranch House, September 2008

- Location within the Los Angeles metropolitan area
- 34.1945°N 118.6199°W
- Location: 22633 Vanowen Street, West Hills, Los Angeles, California

History
- Built: 1869-1872

Site notes
- Governing body: City of Los Angeles Dept. of Recreation & Parks

Los Angeles Historic-Cultural Monument
- Designated: November 2, 1962
- Reference no.: 9

Shadow Ranch is a historic ranch house, built from 1869-1872 using adobe and redwood lumber, on the original Workman Ranch in the western San Fernando Valley of Los Angeles, California. For much of the 20th century it was in Canoga Park, but it is now within the boundaries of the West Hills community. The park is also allegedly haunted, owing to its grim history, and has been featured on Ghost Adventures.

== History ==
=== 19th century ===
The ranch began as a dry-land wheat farm owned by the San Fernando Homestead Association led by Isaac Lankershim and Isaac Van Nuys. Albert Workman, an Australian immigrant, began as the superintendent of Van Nuys' Los Angeles Farm and Milling Company. After 1869 Workman purchased the 9,000-acre (36 km^{2}) ranch, and cultivated it with another 4,000 acres (16 km^{2}) nearby. The ranch also had a thousand head of cattle at one time. Workman imported Australian blue gum eucalyptus tree seeds from his homeland and planted them on the ranch. Some claim the numerous eucalyptus trees in California of that species, Eucalyptus globulus, originate from the Workman Ranch groves.

=== 20th century ===
The site has multiple Hollywood connections. In the 1930s the Workman Ranch was acquired by Colin Clements and Florence Ryerson, a couple who were screenwriters for the film studio. Ryerson co-wrote the screenplay for the 1939 film The Wizard of Oz while living there. She renamed the estate Shadow Ranch for the amount of shade provided by the numerous large eucalyptus trees, originally planted during the Workman era.

It was acquired in 1948 by another screenwriter, Ranald MacDougall, whose credits include "Mildred Pierce" and "Cleopatra." In 1961, film director William Wyler used the ranch house as a filming location for The Children’s Hour, based on the play by Lillian Hellman.

== City park ==
Today, the historic Shadow Ranch residence stands on a 13 acres (53,000 m^{2}) parcel; the remaining undeveloped land of the original ranch is now an L.A. city park. The structure is used as a recreational facility and events venue. When the Los Angeles Cultural Heritage Commission was formed in 1962, Shadow Ranch was one of the first ten properties to be designated as a city Historic-Cultural Monument (HCM #9).

== See also ==
- Rancho El Escorpión - adjacent on the west
- History of the San Fernando Valley to 1915
- List of Los Angeles Historic-Cultural Monuments in the San Fernando Valley
