= Jesse James Hollywood =

American criminal (born 1980)

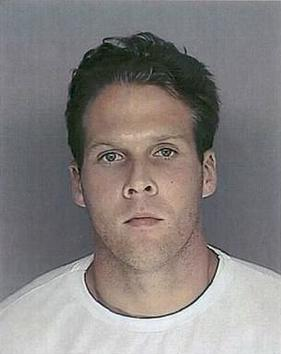
- Hollywood in 2005
- Born: January 28, 1980 (age 46); West Hills, Los Angeles, California, U.S.
- Occupation: Drug dealer
- Known for: Murder of Nicholas Markowitz
- Spouse: Melinda Hollywood (m. 2014)
- Children: 1
- Status: Incarcerated
- Motive: Drug dealing
- Criminal charges: Kidnapping and murder with special circumstances
- Penalty: Life imprisonment without the possibility of parole
- Time at large: 5 years

Details
- Victims: 1
- Country: United States
- State: California
- Weapon: Gun
- Date apprehended: 2005
- Imprisoned at: Richard J. Donovan Correctional Facility

Jesse James Hollywood (born January 28, 1980) is an American former drug dealer who kidnapped and ordered the murder of Nicholas Markowitz in 2000. He was arrested in 2005 and is serving life at Richard J. Donovan Correctional Facility near San Diego, California.

== Childhood and adolescence ==
Jesse James Hollywood was born to Jack and Laurie Hollywood and was raised in West Hills, a neighborhood in the western San Fernando Valley region of the City of Los Angeles, California. As a child he was involved in junior baseball league. Hollywood attended Pinecrest Woodland Hills, in Woodland Hills, California, where he excelled in reading and baseball. Here, he also became best friends with another boy from an affluent family and the two of them became a duo, referring to themselves as "The Pros." They were often seen wearing baggy jeans with that moniker spray painted along the legs, as was fashionable at the time. His father moved the family to Colorado in an attempt to run a restaurant in the mid-1990s, but returned to West Hills in 1995.

Hollywood also played baseball when he attended El Camino Real High School.

During his adolescent years he started power lifting and ingesting muscle supplements to help build up his muscle mass. His coach would later describe him as an "emotional kid" who was later expelled for erupting into a violent fit of rage at one of his teachers near the end of his sophomore year. He transferred to Calabasas High School where he played on the varsity baseball team until he injured his back and leg, forcing him to give up the sport.

Investigators believe he started selling illegal drugs a year before he ordered the murder of Nicholas Markowitz. He recruited his former high school friends William Skidmore, Brian Affronti, Benjamin Markowitz, and Jesse Rugge to dispense narcotics for him and build up a profitable illicit drug operation. He had been a close friend of Benjamin Markowitz, playing on the same junior baseball league and would visit the same Malibu, California gymnasium to exercise together.

== Murder ==
On August 6, 2000, Hollywood and some of his crew, including Jesse Rugge and William Skidmore, kidnapped Nicholas Markowitz. Nicholas was the half-brother of Ben Markowitz, who owed Hollywood $1,200. The intention was to use Nicholas as leverage to get Ben Markowitz to pay. Nicholas was taken from Los Angeles to Santa Barbara, and held for three days. Hollywood became concerned after consulting a lawyer who advised him that anyone convicted of kidnapping would receive a life sentence. Hollywood ordered Ryan Hoyt, one of his subordinates, to kill Markowitz, giving Hoyt a TEC-9 automatic pistol with which to do it.

On August 9, Hoyt and other associates of Hollywood took Markowitz to a rural location in the mountains north of Santa Barbara and killed him, burying his body in a shallow grave. The body was found three days later.

== Life as a fugitive ==
When Ryan Hoyt was arrested, Hollywood fled to Canada and then to Brazil with help from his father, his godfather Richard Dispenza (who was unaware he was a fugitive at the time), and his girlfriend. Law enforcement agencies and the Markowitz family offered a reward of US$30,000 for information leading to Hollywood's capture, an amount which was later raised to US$50,000. Hollywood lived on Copacabana Beach, where he assumed the identity of "Michael Costa Giroux". He claimed to be a native of Rio de Janeiro, and later on, of Saquarema.

To blend in, Hollywood learned Portuguese. He earned money by putting up posters advertising a nightclub and later got jobs giving private English classes and as a dog walker. Yet the bulk of the money he lived on came from a US$1,200 monthly stipend from his father.

He was profiled on America's Most Wanted in September 2000 and June 2004, and twice in 2005 after he was captured, as well as Unsolved Mysteries in August 2001. The story was also featured on NBC's Dateline.

He developed a relationship with Marcia Reis, and in November 2004 she got pregnant. Hollywood thought her pregnancy would prevent him from being extradited to the United States, as he believed Brazilian law included a provision that protected the father of a native Brazilian from extradition. This had been true, but the law was changed after the international controversy involving fugitive criminal Ronnie Biggs. Additionally, since he had arrived in the country with a false passport he was an illegal immigrant, which meant he could be deported regardless of his fathering a child with a native Brazilian.

United States authorities worked with Brazilian agents and discovered that Hollywood was planning to meet a cousin at a mall. He was arrested by Brazilian authorities in Saquarema in March 2005. In July 2005 Reis gave birth to Hollywood's son, named John Paul Hollywood-Reis.

In 2005, on the same day that Jesse James Hollywood was arrested in Brazil, his father was arrested for manufacturing the illicit narcotic GHB, but the charge was later thrown out of court. Jack Hollywood remained in custody on an outstanding 2002 warrant for a marijuana-related charge and later received 18 months in an Arizona prison.

While Hollywood had been in Brazil, all of the other participants in the murder were arrested and tried. Ryan Hoyt was on death row at San Quentin State Prison when his sentence was commuted to life in prison in January 2024. Graham Pressley was released from the California Youth Authority Facility in 2007. By July 2, 2013, Jesse Rugge had been granted parole. William Skidmore was released in April 2009 after serving 9 years behind bars for the kidnapping.

== Court rulings and trial ==
In 2006, the movie Alpha Dog, based on Jesse Hollywood and the kidnap and murder of Nicholas Markowitz, premiered. During filming, Santa Barbara County Deputy District Attorney Ronald J. "Ron" Zonen provided copies of many documents on the case and served as an unpaid consultant to the film, citing his desire to have Hollywood captured. Zonen prosecuted Hollywood's co-defendants and was poised to prosecute Hollywood. James Blatt, Hollywood's defense attorney, claimed there was a conflict of interest, and the California Court of Appeal for the Second District ruled on October 5, 2006, that, based on Zonen's disclosure of the files and consultant service he should be recused from further involvement in prosecuting Hollywood. On December 20, 2006, the California Supreme Court granted review on the case effectively staying the order to recuse Zonen.

On May 12, 2008, the California Supreme Court ruled that Zonen need not be recused. Nonetheless, Zonen was replaced with Joshua Lynn, who was serving as lead prosecution attorney. While in jail, Hollywood began signing his mail as "Alpha Dog" and had mentioned an "Alpha Dog World Tour".

After the Court review, in June 2008 his trial date was set to begin February 19, 2009, but it was delayed. Three months later the murder trial officially started on Friday, May 15. The defense's opening statements stated that Hollywood was not involved with the murder. In his opening statement, Santa Barbara County Deputy District Attorney Joshua Lynn described Hollywood as "a ruthless coward".

On Monday, May 18, witnesses called to the stand included Jeff Markowitz (the victim's father), Pauline Mahoney (who was driving with her sons when she saw a group of men attacking Markowitz), and Brian Affonti (a one time friend of Hollywood's who was picked up after the kidnapping). Affonti told the jury that he knew about Hollywood's gun, a TEC-9, which is the alleged murder weapon. Chas Salsbury, Hollywood's getaway driver, testified at trial that following the murder "Hollywood seemed remorseful, depressed, and at some points even suicidal".

Saulsbury continued on the fifth day with Kelly Carpenter discussing the actions of Rugge and Pressley's mother. The following day saw testimony from Rugge's childhood friend, Richard Hoeflinger, who spoke about what he witnessed. Subsequently, several Santa Barbara residents told the jury about events leading to Nick Markowitz's murder.

At the start of the second week Michelle Lasher, Hollywood's former girlfriend, testified that she still loved Hollywood and was hostile to the prosecution. Lasher also admitted to lying to police because she did not want Hollywood to be caught. The Hollywood family friend, attorney Stephen Hogg, told the jury about "a tense conversation in the attorney's Simi Valley backyard" wherein Hogg told Hollywood "that kidnapping can carry a life sentence". Graham Pressley's testimony about the events followed Hogg's appearance. Pressley testified that Rugge "told me that Jesse Hollywood offered him $2,000 to kill Nick, but [Rugge said] that that was crazy, [Hollywood] was crazy". Pressley's testimony, important for the prosecution, continued Friday and early into the third week. During this time, Ben Markowitz took the stand. After that, witness Casey Sheehan stated that, while he and his longtime friend, Hollywood, dined at an Outback Steakhouse, Hollywood told him that the situation "had been taken care of". In the following days, various medical experts and law enforcement officials testified. At this point, the prosecution rested their case on Wednesday of the third week.

Hollywood's defense began on the Monday of the third week. Hollywood took the stand on the first day of the defense, denying any role in the murder and saying that he was angry when Hoyt told him about the murder at a birthday party. Hollywood recounted the kidnapping, the events that led up to it, and discussed his life on the run. Hollywood's testimony lasted four days with the prosecution cross-examining Hollywood about making threats, closing bank accounts, withdrawing money, and selling his home. Hollywood spent much of his time on the stand denying the testimony of previous witnesses. The last witness the defense called was District Attorney investigator Paul Kimes, who was questioned by co-counsel Alex Kessel about phone records. Closing arguments began on Tuesday and Wednesday of the fourth week, after which the case went to the jury. During closing statements, the defense said that Hollywood's associates lied, while the prosecution called Hollywood "a child killer". The jury considered three different charges, with penalties ranging from 8 years in prison to the death penalty.

=== Conviction and sentencing ===
On July 8, 2009, following three days of deliberation, the jury reached a verdict. The jury found Hollywood guilty of kidnapping and first-degree murder with special circumstances, for which he could face the death penalty. On Monday July 13, the jury began the penalty phase of the trial. The mothers of the defendant and of the victim took the stand, as did brothers of the defendant and the victim. Closing arguments began during the second day of the penalty phase. On July 15, 2009, Hollywood was sentenced according to the jury's verdict of life in prison.

== Post-conviction ==
Hollywood has continued to file for motions of appeal for both his trial and sentencing in various courts since his initial judgement. On February 5, 2010, the judge upheld Hollywood's sentence to life in prison without the possibility of parole. On February 12, 2012, an appellate court upheld the conviction and denied a motion for a new trial. Hollywood's defense alleged he was not guilty because Markowitz could have left at any time of his own will and chose not to do so, ending Hollywood's responsibility at the time he last saw Markowitz.

On January 19, 2014, Hollywood married Melinda Enos, a woman who began writing to him after his sentencing. The ceremony was held in the visitor's room. With the release of Rugge in October 2013, Hollywood and Hoyt are the only two still serving prison sentences for the crimes related to Markowitz's kidnapping and death.
