= Alpha Dog =

2006 crime drama film by Nick Cassavetes

- Theatrical release poster
- Directed by: Nick Cassavetes
- Written by: Nick Cassavetes
- Produced by: Sidney Kimmel; Chuck Pacheco
- Starring: Ben Foster; Shawn Hatosy; Emile Hirsch; Christopher Marquette; Sharon Stone; Justin Timberlake; Anton Yelchin; Bruce Willis
- Cinematography: Robert Fraisse
- Edited by: Alan Heim
- Music by: Aaron Zigman
- Production company: Sidney Kimmel Entertainment
- Distributed by: Universal Pictures (United States); Capitol Films (International)
- Release dates: January 27, 2006 (Sundance); January 12, 2007 (United States)
- Running time: 117 minutes
- Country: United States
- Language: English
- Budget: $9.5 million
- Box office: $32.4 million

Alpha Dog is a 2006 American crime drama film written and directed by Nick Cassavetes. It is based on the true story of the kidnapping and murder of Nicholas Markowitz in 2000. The film features an ensemble cast that includes Ben Foster, Shawn Hatosy, Emile Hirsch, Christopher Marquette, Sharon Stone, Justin Timberlake, Anton Yelchin, and Bruce Willis. Dominique Swain, Alex Solowitz, Fernando Vargas, Olivia Wilde, Amanda Seyfried, Harry Dean Stanton and David Thornton also have minor roles.

Alpha Dog had its world premiere at the 2006 Sundance Film Festival on January 27, 2006, and was released in the United States on January 12, 2007, by Universal Pictures in the United States and by Capitol Films in international markets. The film received mixed reviews and was a minor box office success, grossing $32.4 million worldwide on a budget of $9.5 million.

== Plot ==
In 1999, Johnny Truelove works as a young drug dealer while making a living in the San Gabriel Valley. Johnny's father, Sonny, supplies him with marijuana, which he distributes with his gang of friends: Frankie Ballenbacher, Johnny's right-hand man and best friend; Tiko Martinez, the group's muscle; Elvis Schmidt, who is ridiculed for being in debt to Johnny; and Jake Mazursky, a local drug addict also in debt with Johnny. Jake attempts to borrow money from his father, Butch, and stepmother, Olivia, while his younger half-brother Zack looks up to him and longs to escape his home life.

A fight breaks out when Jake tries to pay Johnny only part of his debt, leading Johnny to get him fired from his telemarketing job by ratting on him to his boss that Jake is on drugs, and Jake to retaliate by breaking into and trashing Johnny's house with a couple of his friends. Johnny brings Frankie and Tiko to confront Jake, but he is nowhere to be found. Spotting Zack on the side of a road, the gang impulsively kidnaps him, planning to hold him until Jake pays up, and drive to Palm Springs. Frankie is left to watch Zack while Johnny and Tiko return to San Gabriel for prior commitments. That night, while attending a street fiesta, Frankie offers Zack a chance to leave, but he declines, wanting a break from home and not wanting to cause more problems for Jake, and the two strike up an unlikely friendship. Meanwhile, Jake violently interrupts a party that he believes Johnny may be attending, knocking several people unconscious before telling everyone there that he is looking for Truelove.

Staying at the house of Frankie's father, Juergen, Zack meets Frankie's friends Keith Stratten, Julie Beckley (with whom he falls in love), Sabrina Pope (Frankie's girlfriend), and Susan Hartunian, the only one concerned about his abduction. Johnny comes over and contemplates with Frankie on what to do. Frankie suggests that they pay Zack to keep quiet about the kidnapping and send him home, to which Johnny agrees. However, after a threatening phone-call from Jake and learning from his lawyer that he could face life in prison for his actions, Johnny goes to Elvis and offers to cancel his debt if he kills Zack, handing him a submachine gun before going out with his girlfriend, Angela Holden, to celebrate her birthday. Believing Zack will be returning home that night, Frankie and his friends throw a raucous party at a hotel, during which Zack goes skinny dipping with Julie and her friend Alma, leading to a threesome wherein he loses his virginity.

Julie, Alma, Susan, and Sabrina all happily say goodbye to Zack and leave. A little while later, Elvis arrives and argues with Frankie over Johnny's plan to kill Zack. While Frankie runs off, Elvis politely introduces himself to Zack, then takes Keith to dig a grave in the nearby mountains. Frankie returns and gives Zack a final chance to escape, but Zack declines, oblivious to the danger he's in. Elvis and Keith return, and Frankie finally relents when Elvis explains they could all face life in prison if Zack goes home. Sonny, Johnny's godfather and Sonny's older accomplice Cosmo Gadabeeti, and their lawyer confront Johnny, telling him they will try to make a deal with Olivia so the crew will get a light sentence, which Johnny believes will never work. Sonny also furiously orders Johnny to call off the hit, but Johnny refuses, believing Zack is already free.

Frankie, Elvis, Keith, and Zack drive out into the mountains and begin walking up a remote hiking trail. Keith tearfully embraces Zack and refuses to go any further up. Zack finally realizes the danger he's in when he sees the grave and begins to break down crying, pleading for his life. Frankie contemplates to Elvis that they shouldn't do it, but Elvis insists on following through to repay his debt. Frankie calms Zack down, telling him that he would never hurt him, and ties up his hands and closes his mouth with tape. Elvis then knocks Zack down into the grave and shoots him dead before he and Frankie silently leave. Left in the hastily covered shallow grave, Zack's body is found by hikers a few days later.

Sometime later, Susan angrily confronts Frankie over Zack's murder before she goes to alert the police, who catch Elvis trying to secure a lift out of town. Johnny flees to Albuquerque, New Mexico where an old classmate of his, Buzz Fecske, then drives him to Cosmo's house. Tiko, Keith, Frankie, and Elvis are convicted for their roles in the kidnapping and eventual murder, with Tiko serving nine years in prison, Keith staying at the California Youth Authority until the age of 25, Frankie receiving a life sentence, and Elvis on Death Row in San Quentin State Prison.

Upon being asked about how Johnny was able to escape authorities for four years without any known source of help, Sonny and Cosmo deny having anything to do with it and take no responsibility in how Johnny turned out and the crimes he committed. In 2005, after over five years on the FBI's most wanted list, Johnny is arrested in Paraguay, now back in California awaiting trial, facing the death penalty if found guilty.

== Cast ==
- Emile Hirsch as Johnny Truelove, the leader, or the "alpha dog." Inspired by Jesse James Hollywood. Hollywood was convicted on July 8, 2009, for ordering the kidnapping and murder of Nick Markowitz and sentenced to life in prison without the possibility of parole. He was 20 years old at the time of the murder.
- Justin Timberlake as Frankie "Nuts" Ballenbacher, Johnny's right-hand man and best friend, who becomes friends with Zack when he is assigned to watch him. Inspired by Jesse Rugge. Rugge was acquitted of 1st degree murder, but was charged with aggravated kidnapping with special circumstances. He was sentenced to life in prison, with the possibility of parole after seven years. His petition for parole was denied in 2006. On July 2, 2013, Rugge was granted parole, and on October 24, 2013, he was released from prison after serving 11 years of his life sentence. He was 20 years old at the time of the crime.
- Ben Foster as Jake Mazursky, Zack's older brother. Inspired by Benjamin Markowitz. Markowitz was 22 years old at the time of the crimes against his half-brother and served three years in prison for robbery but has since been released.
- Shawn Hatosy as Elvis Schmidt, the lowest member of the gang and the shooter. At the beginning of the story, he is in debt to Johnny. Inspired by Ryan Hoyt. Hoyt is currently serving life without parole at California Men's Colony for the murder of Nick Markowitz. He was 21 years old at the time of the crime.
- Anton Yelchin as Zack Mazursky, the victim. Inspired by Nicholas Markowitz. Markowitz was murdered by Ryan Hoyt, a member of Jesse James Hollywood's crew; he was 15 years old when he died.
- Sharon Stone as Olivia Mazursky, Zack's mother. Inspired by Susan Markowitz. Susan is Nick Markowitz's mother; she later authored a book called My Stolen Son: The Nick Markowitz Story
- Bruce Willis as Sonny Truelove, Johnny's father and marijuana supplier. It is implied that he has Mafia connections. Inspired by John "Jack" Hollywood. Hollywood is Jesse James's father. He was arrested in 2005, the same day son Jesse James was captured in Brazil, for manufacturing GHB, but the charge was later dismissed. Jack remained in custody on an outstanding 2002 warrant for a marijuana-related charge and later received 18 months in an Arizona prison. He has since been released.
- Chris Marquette as Keith Stratten, a friend of Frankie who digs Zack's grave but is not present for the murder. Inspired by Graham Pressley. In July 2002, he was tried as a minor and in October 2002 as an adult. Served eight years at the California Youth Authority until he was released in 2007 at the age of 25. Age 17 at the time.
- Dominique Swain as Susan Hartunian, a friend of Frankie's who is concerned about Zack's well-being. Inspired by Natasha Adams-Young. Adams-Young was given immunity in exchange for her testimony. Friend of Rugge and Pressley. After reading in the paper that Nick was murdered, she confronted Rugge and asked if he had anything to do with it. Despite Rugge explaining that he didn't, she knew he was lying and told her father, a lawyer, what happened. He, in turn, called the police. Age 19 at the time.
- Alex Solowitz as Bobby "911" Kaye, a member of the gang. Inspired by Brian Affronti. Affronti was one of Hollywood's friends. 20 years old at the time.
- Fernando Vargas as Tiko "TKO" Martinez, a member of the gang and muscle of the group. Inspired by William Skidmore. Skidmore served nine years in state prison for kidnapping and robbery out of a plea bargain and was released in April 2009. 20 years old at the time.
- Olivia Wilde as Angela Holden, Johnny's girlfriend. Inspired by Michelle Lasher, Hollywood's girlfriend. She was arrested while on the run with him and charged with harboring a fugitive. 19 years old at the time.
- Amanda Seyfried as Julie Beckley, Zack's girlfriend. Inspired by Jeanine, Nick's girlfriend. 17 years old at the time.
- Vincent Kartheiser as Pick Giaimo, a member of the gang whose mother's car was used in the murder. Inspired by Casey Sheehan. Sheehan was one of Hollywood's friends. His vehicle was used in the murder of Nick Markowitz. Arrested, then bailed out; 20 years old at the time.
- Lukas Haas as Buzz Fecske, Johnny's childhood friend who drives him back to Los Angeles after he escapes the police in New Mexico.
- Heather Wahlquist as Wanda Haynes, Jake's girlfriend, a waitress at a steakhouse.
- Harry Dean Stanton as Cosmo Gadabeeti, Johnny's godfather and Sonny's older accomplice. Implied he has connections to the Mafia. Inspired by John Roberts. Roberts was a Hollywood family close friend. His van was used in the kidnapping of Nick Markowitz.
- David Thornton as Butch Mazursky, Zack and Jake's father. Inspired by Jeff Markowitz. Markowitz was Nick and Ben Markowitz's father.
- Charity Shea as Sabrina Pope, Frankie's girlfriend. Inspired by Kelly Carpenter, Rugge's girlfriend. Carpenter was given immunity in exchange for testimony; 16 at the time.
- Holt McCallany as Detective Tom Finnegan, police officer. Finnegan was the officer looking for Hollywood; he arrested the crew as well as interviewed witnesses.
- Amber Heard as Alma, a friend of Julie who hooks up with Zack.
- Alex Kingston as Tiffany Hartunian, Susan's mother.

Additionally, Alec Vigil plays Johnny's younger brother P.J. Truelove, producer Chuck Pacheco plays Frankie's friend Chucky Mota, and Xan Cassavetes plays Jonna Kirshner, one of the first witnesses of Zack's kidnapping.

== Production ==
Nick Cassavetes developed Alpha Dog as a dramatization inspired by the real-life kidnapping and murder of Nicholas Markowitz in 2000. Although the film is based on the events surrounding the case, Cassavetes altered the names of many of the people involved and incorporated fictionalized dialogue and scenes while retaining the broad outline of the crime.

Principal photography began in the summer of 2004 and took place primarily in Southern California, including locations in Los Angeles and surrounding communities. The production sought to recreate the suburban environment and youth culture depicted in the story, with many scenes filmed in residential neighborhoods, parks, and desert locations.

Cassavetes assembled an ensemble cast consisting of established actors alongside younger performers. Emile Hirsch was cast as Johnny Truelove, the fictional counterpart to Jesse James Hollywood, while Anton Yelchin portrayed Zack Mazursky, based on Nicholas Markowitz. Justin Timberlake was cast as Frankie Ballenbacher, marking one of his earliest dramatic film roles, while Ben Foster portrayed Jake Mazursky. The supporting cast included Bruce Willis, Sharon Stone, Harry Dean Stanton, Dominique Swain, Amanda Seyfried, Olivia Wilde, Lukas Haas, and Vincent Kartheiser.

In preparation for their roles, several cast members researched the real case and worked with Cassavetes to develop their characters. The director has stated that the film was intended to examine themes of peer pressure, immaturity, personal responsibility, and the consequences of violence rather than serve as a documentary account of the events.

== Legal issues ==
During filming in 2004, Santa Barbara County Deputy District Attorney Ronald J. Zonen provided copies of many documents on the case and served as an unpaid consultant to the film, citing his desire to have Hollywood captured. Zonen prosecuted Hollywood's co-defendants and was poised to prosecute Hollywood. After Hollywood was captured in Saquarema, Brazil, and subsequently returned to the United States, his defense lawyer claimed Zonen had a conflict of interest; the California Court of Appeal for the Second District ruled on October 5, 2006, that Zonen should be recused from further involvement in prosecuting Hollywood because of his disclosure of the files and work on the film. The California Supreme Court subsequently reversed that holding, but Deputy District Attorney Joshua Lynn replaced Zonen as lead prosecution attorney.

Hollywood's attorney, James Blatt, tried to block the release of the film. After the delay, Hollywood's trial started May 15, 2009, with the defense's opening statements saying Hollywood was not involved with the murder. In his opening statement, Lynn described Hollywood as "a ruthless coward." On July 8, 2009, Hollywood was convicted of simple kidnapping and first-degree murder with special circumstances and was sentenced to life in prison without the possibility of parole.

== Release ==
Alpha Dog was first screened at the Sundance Film Festival on January 27, 2006, as the closing film. The film was originally set to be distributed by New Line Cinema, who previously distributed John Q. (2002) and The Notebook (2004) for director Nick Cassavetes. However, Universal Pictures acquired the film after New Line Cinema only planned to give the film a limited release. The film's release was delayed by a year to January 12, 2007.

=== Home media ===
Alpha Dog was released on DVD and HD-DVD on May 1, 2007, by Universal Studios Home Entertainment. DVD sales gathered $12,324,535 in revenue from 743,036 units sold. It was released on Blu-ray on July 13, 2010.

== Reception ==
=== Box office ===
During its opening weekend, Alpha Dog grossed $6,412,775 and was #7 at the box office. The film closed on February 22, 2007, after grossing $15,309,602 domestically, and totaled $32,145,115 worldwide over its six-week release.

In the United States, Alpha Dog was released on January 12, 2007, along with Stomp the Yard & Primeval.

=== Critical response ===
On the review aggregator website Rotten Tomatoes, 54% of 144 critics' reviews are positive, with an average rating of 5.7/10. The website's consensus reads: "A glossy yet unflinching portrait of violent, hedonistic teenagers. Bruce Willis and Sharon Stone chew the scenery, while Justin Timberlake gives a noteworthy performance." Metacritic, which uses a weighted average, assigned the film a score of 53 out of 100, based on 30 critics, indicating "mixed or average" reviews. Audiences polled by CinemaScore gave the film an average grade of "B−" on an A+ to F scale.

Justin Chang of Variety wrote: "Writer-director Nick Cassavetes' sprawling dramatization recklessly blurs the line between reconstruction and reality in ways that are admittedly interesting, if more than a little artistically suspect." Yelchin was praised as "able to bring all of the conflicting emotions of Zack," and conveying all of it beautifully.

=== Markowitz family reaction ===
Susan Markowitz attempted suicide three times. Jeff Markowitz elaborated, "She is so tortured by what happened that she has tried to take her own life. The last thing that either of us want is to see this picture. How would any loving parent feel about a Hollywood movie that glamorizes their son's death and allows celebrities to cash in on a brutal, evil murder?" Nonetheless, both Susan and Jeff attended the film's premiere, and Susan stated she was moved by Anton Yelchin's portrayal of Zack (Nick). After the screening, she embraced Sharon Stone, who played Olivia (Susan).

=== Accolades ===
Award nominations for Alpha Dog
Year	Award	Category	Nominee(s)	Result
2006	Young Hollywood Awards	Breakthrough Performance - Male	Ben Foster	Won
2007	Boston Society of Film Critics Awards	Best Supporting Actor	Ben Foster (Also for 3:10 to Yuma)	Nominated
2007	Gran Premio Internazionale del Doppiaggio	Best Rising Voice Actor	Andrea Mete (for the dubbing of Justin Timberlake in the Italian version)	Won
2007	Gran Premio Internazionale del Doppiaggio	Best Voice Actor	Massimiliano Alto (for the dubbing of Emile Hirsch in the Italian version)	Nominated
2007	Gran Premio Internazionale del Doppiaggio	Best Supporting Voice Actor	Loris Loddi (for the dubbing of Ben Foster in the Italian version)	Nominated
2007	Gran Premio Internazionale del Doppiaggio	Best Dubbing Direction	Marco Mete (Italian version)	Nominated
2007	Gran Premio Internazionale del Doppiaggio	Best Dubbing Technician	Stefano Nissolino (Italian version)	Nominated
2007	Voci nell'ombra	Best Character Actor Voice	Loris Loddi (for the dubbing of Ben Foster in the Italian version)	Won
2007	MTV Movie Awards	Breakthrough Performance	Justin Timberlake	Nominated
2007	Teen Choice Awards	Choice Movie: Breakout Male	Justin Timberlake (Also for Black Snake Moan)	Nominated

== Music ==
Alpha Dog (Original Motion Picture Soundtrack)

Soundtrack album by Various Artists
- Released: January 9, 2007
- Recorded: 2005–06
- Genre: Rap
- Label: Milan
- Producer: Aaron Zigman

A soundtrack was released by Milan Records on January 9, 2007.

Alpha Dog (Original Motion Picture Soundtrack) track listing
No.	Title	Writer(s)	Performer(s)	Length
1.	"Over the Rainbow"	Harold Arlen (music); Edgar Yispel Harburg (lyrics)	Eva Cassidy
2.	"Enemy and I"	Raulin Guidly	Lazarus
3.	"Bullet and a Target"	Clarence Greenwood	Citizen Cope
4.	"Jake Breaks In"	Aaron Zigman; Paul Bushnell; Paul Graham	Paul Bushnell
5.	"Caribou Lou"	Aaron D. Yates	Tech N9ne
6.	"Revolving"	Aaron Zigman; Paul Bushnell; Paul Graham	Paul Bushnell
7.	"Slither"	Aaron D. Yates	Tech N9ne
8.	"Liar"	Aaron Zigman; Paul Bushnell; Paul Graham	Miredys Peguero & Paul Graham
9.	"Winner"	Aaron Zigman; Paul Bushnell; Paul Graham	Paul Bushnell
10.	"Let's Chill"	Aaron Zigman; Mateo Liboriel	Mic Holden, Maya, & Reneé Rogers
11.	"Dragonfly"	Aaron Zigman; Paul Bushnell; Paul Graham	Miredys Peguero & Paul Bushnell
12.	"LA LA Land"	Aaron Zigman; Aaron D. Yates	Tech N9ne feat. Gina Cassavetes
13.	"Pool Party"	Aaron Zigman; Mateo Liboriel	Mic Holden
14.	"Never Give Up"	Aaron Zigman; Mateo Liboriel	Mic Holden
15.	"At the Site/Driving to the Site"	Aaron Zigman; Nick Cassavetes; Paul Bushnell; Paul Graham	Aaron Zigman & Nick Cassavetes
16.	"We Are the Lost"	Aaron Zigman; Paul Bushnell; Paul Graham	Lawrence Faljean
17.	"Basketball"	Aaron Zigman; Mateo Liboriel	Lowd
18.	"Cookie Monster"	Aaron Zigman; Paul Bushnell; Paul Graham	Paul Graham & Paul Bushnell
19.	"Elvis Arrested"	Aaron Zigman; Paul Bushnell; Paul Graham	Aaron Zigman
20.	"Weightlifting"	Aaron Zigman; Mateo Liboriel	Lowd
21.	"Marco Polo"	Aaron Zigman; Mateo Liboriel	Lowd & Cassie Simone
22.	"Night and Day"	Mateo Liboriel; Aaron D Yates	Tech N9ne
