= Murder of Nicholas Markowitz =

Murder of an American teenager

Nicholas Markowitz
- Born: September 19, 1984; West Hills, Los Angeles, California, U.S.
- Died: August 9, 2000 (aged 15); Santa Ynez Mountains in Goleta, California
- Cause of death: Murder (gunshot wounds)
- Parent(s): Jeff Markowitz; Susan Markowitz

Nicholas Samuel Markowitz (September 19, 1984 – August 9, 2000) was an American teenager who was kidnapped and murdered at the age of 15 after a feud over drug money between his half-brother Benjamin Markowitz and Jesse James Hollywood.

== Kidnapping and murder ==
Markowitz lived in West Hills, Los Angeles, with his parents, Jeff and Susan Markowitz. A feud between Nicholas' older half-brother, Ben Markowitz, and Jesse James Hollywood, a mid-level drug dealer, began over an alleged $1,200 debt owed to Hollywood by Ben Markowitz. On August 6, 2000, Hollywood and his friends Jesse Rugge and William Skidmore decided to confront Ben. On their way to see him, they saw Nicholas walking on the side of the road and decided to abduct him and hold him for ransom. After they chased, assaulted, and abducted Nicholas, they forced him into a white van and sped off.

Markowitz's captors took him to Santa Barbara and plied him with drugs and alcohol. While in Santa Barbara, Nicholas met Rugge's friends Graham Pressley, Natasha Adams-Young, and Kelly Carpenter and attended various house parties with them. Reports indicate that many witnesses, parents and teens alike, saw Nicholas with the others, but either did not realize anything was amiss or chose not to report it.

After Hollywood told Rugge that Nicholas would be returning home, Rugge and several others held a party at the Lemon Tree Inn. However, after learning of the legal ramifications he could face for kidnapping, Hollywood called Ryan Hoyt, another member of his gang who owed him money. Hollywood gave Hoyt a TEC-9 semi-automatic handgun and directed him to kill Nicholas as a way of paying off his debt. A decision was made to commit the murder on the Lizard’s Mouth trail in the Santa Ynez Mountains north of Goleta.

After the party, Hoyt, Rugge, and Pressley drove Nicholas to the mountains and walked up a trail to a grave dug by Pressley earlier that night. Rugge bound Nicholas's hands behind his back and covered his mouth with duct tape. Hoyt then hit Nicholas in the back of the head with a shovel, knocking him into the grave, and shot him nine times with Hollywood's handgun. The grave was shallow, and was located near a popular trail. Nicholas's body was found on August 12, 2000. Hoyt, Rugge, Skidmore, and Pressley were all arrested. Hollywood went on the run; he was captured in a town near Rio de Janeiro five years later.

== Legal proceedings ==
Several civil and criminal court proceedings resulted in relation to the Markowitz murder. Those proceedings include:

- Ryan James Hoyt, aged 21 at the time of the murder, was charged with the first-degree murder of Markowitz. He was convicted on November 21, 2001 and sentenced to death on December 9, 2001; his death sentence was commuted to life imprisonment in 2024.
- Jesse Taylor Rugge, aged 20 at the time of the murder, was charged with aiding in the kidnap and murder of Nicholas Markowitz. He was convicted in 2002 of aggravated kidnapping for ransom or extortion with special circumstances, but was acquitted on the murder charge. He was sentenced to life in prison with the possibility of parole after seven years. Parole was denied in 2006. After serving 11 years in prison Rugge was granted parole, and released from prison on October 24, 2013.
- William R. Skidmore, aged 20 at the time of the murder, was charged with kidnapping and robbery. In September 2002, he was sentenced to nine years in a state prison as part of a plea bargain. Skidmore was released in April 2009.
- Graham Pressley, aged 17 at the time of the murder, dug Markowitz's grave. He was tried twice. In July 2002, he was acquitted of kidnapping; the jury hung on the murder charge. In October 2002, he was retried on the murder charge and was convicted of second-degree murder. Pressley was incarcerated at a California Youth Authority facility until shortly before his 25th birthday in 2007. He has since been released. Pressley died of esophageal cancer on December 21, 2022.
- Jesse James Hollywood, aged 20 at the time of the murder, was not present at the scene of the crime; however, he was later found to have ordered the murder. After Markowitz was killed, Hollywood immediately went on the run. He was arrested in Saquarema, Brazil after being on the FBI's most wanted list for five years. In 2009, Hollywood was convicted of kidnapping and first-degree murder and sentenced to life in prison without the possibility of parole.
- In 2003, the Markowitz family won an $11.2 million civil lawsuit against the kidnappers and the murderers, along with other defendants such as the family friend whose van was used in the kidnapping and the owners of several homes where Nicholas was held against his will.

== In popular culture ==
The crime documentary television series Unsolved Mysteries covered the events of the murder of Nicholas Markowitz in an episode that aired in August 2001.

The feature film Alpha Dog, based on the events leading up to the murder of Markowitz and directed by Nick Cassavetes, was released in 2006. In the film, the character modeled after Nicholas Markowitz was named Zack Mazursky. The role was played by Anton Yelchin, who, like Markowitz, was also raised in the San Fernando Valley.

== Bibliography ==
- Jenna Glatzer, Susan Markowitz (2010). My stolen son; The Nick Markowitz story. New York: Berkley Books. ISBN 978-0-425-23634-5.
