= China Flat (Santa Monica Mountains) =

Plateau in the American state of California

Coordinates: 34.209°N 118.770°W

China Flat is a plateau in the north−central Simi Hills, in Ventura County, Southern California.

The plateau sits at a 2,000 feet (610 m) elevation and is situated just below Simi Peak, which is the highest point in the Simi Hills.

== Geography ==
The plateau averages around 2,000 feet (610 m) in elevation. It features native oak woodlands and chaparral habitats, with large sandstone outcroppings.

It is protected within Cheeseboro Canyon / Palo Comado Canyon Open Space park of the Santa Monica Mountains National Recreation Area. The area is located between the cities of Oak Park, Thousand Oaks and Simi Valley.

Trails reach China Flat from trailheads in the Conejo Valley, Simi Valley, and via Upper Las Virgenes Canyon Open Space Preserve (Ahmanson Ranch) from Calabasas and the San Fernando Valley. The trail to the summit of Simi Peak (2403 ft.) passes through China Flat.

== See also ==
- Flora of the Santa Monica Mountains + adjacent Simi Hills.
- Natural history of the Santa Monica Mountains + Simi Hills.
- Simi Hills−related topics
