= El Escorpión Park =

Park in the American state of California

Castle Peak
- kas'ele'ew
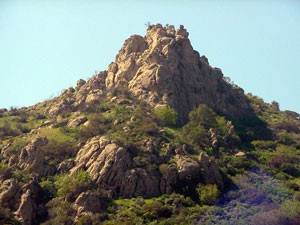
- Castle Peak from the east

Highest point
- Elevation: ~1,475 feet (450 m)
- Coordinates: 34°12′0.45″N 118°39′51.7″W

Geography
- Location: West Hills, Los Angeles, California, United States
- Parent range: Simi Hills

Climbing
- Easiest route: southern route

El Escorpión Park is a three-acre (12,000 m^{2}) park located in the Simi Hills of the western San Fernando Valley, in the West Hills district of Los Angeles, California. The park contains the geographic landmark known as Escorpión Peak or Castle Peak (kas'ele'ew picacho), a 1,475-foot-tall (450 m) rocky peak seen from most parts of the park and the surrounding community.

== Access ==
The El Escorpión Park entrance and parking is at the western end of Vanowen Street, west of Valley Circle Boulevard, in West Hills.

The park is open from sunrise to sunset, 7 days a week. The trails are available for walking, hiking, rock climbing, mountain biking and equestrian use. Dogs are allowed on a leash. Rattlesnakes live in the area, requiring observant footfalls and handholds. Unauthorized motor vehicles and motorbikes are not permitted.

El Escorpión Park is managed by the Los Angeles Department of Recreation and Parks.

== Hiking ==
=== The peak ===
Climbing the rough south side trail to the summit of Castle Peak is not for beginners and is considered challenging. This hike is not recommended for children. The final climb to the top of the peak requires climbing over boulders and other rocks, and missteps or slips can result in a fall. Intermediate and advanced hikers will enjoy the vertical challenge, around 561 feet (171 m) of gain in a very short distance. The beginning of the trail in Moores Canyon is easily seen at the base of the peak. Around 3/4 of the way up the trail becomes more difficult to see, the easiest route veers to the left (west).

=== Other trails ===
- At the summit, along the western ridge line, there is a trail west to a small meadow. At the meadow's southern cliff edge: overlooking Moores Canyon, lower El Escorpión Park, and the Upper Las Virgenes Canyon Open Space Preserve; a panoramic view of the Santa Monica Mountains, Simi Hills, Santa Susana Mountains, San Gabriel Mountains, and the San Fernando Valley. A trail leads northward toward Bell Creek, the community of Bell Canyon, and Bell Canyon Park.
- The 1769 the Juan Bautista de Anza expedition, the first European exploration by land of Las Californias, passed by the area. The U.S. National Park service's Juan Bautista de Anza National Historic Trail goes through Moores Canyon in the Park, from the Vanowen Street end and continuing west through the Upper Las Virgenes Canyon Open Space Preserve.
- An informal small circular mountain bike area with easy jumps is located in upper Moores Canyon near the cyclone fence by the El Escorpión Park and Upper Las Virgenes Canyon Preserve boundary. Several trails goes northwest from this area, around the western side of the Peak, to connect with the trail down Bell Canyon along Bell Creek to Bell Creek Park, and even on to the Victory Trailhead for full loop.
- There are many other trails available for exploration in the area They are shown on the Victory Boulevard's trailhead map display. Los Angeles City's Bell Canyon Park adjoins directly north, with trails along riparian Bell Creek, past the community of Bell Canyon, and to the longer northern route up Castle Peak. The expansive 3,000-acre (12 km^{2}) Upper Las Virgenes Canyon Open Space Preserve adjoins along the southwest of El Escorpión Park with miles of trails and even further links west to the Santa Monica Mountains Conservancy Cheseboro/Palo Comado Canyon Park's trails.

== History ==
Castle Peak is the corrupted American form of the Ventureño Chumash name for the peak, which was Kas'ele'ew (also, Kas'elew) in the Chumash language,

The area was inhabited for around 8,000 years by Native Americans of the Tongva-Fernandeño and Chumash-Ventureño tribes that lived in the Simi Hills and close to tributaries of the Los Angeles River. A village, Hu'wam (Ventureño Chumash placename), was located at the base of Castle Peak along present Bell Creek near the mouth of Bell Canyon. It was a meeting and trading point for them with the Tongva-Fernandeño and Tataviam-Fernandeño people.

== Adjacent parks ==
- Bell Canyon Park
- Upper Las Virgenes Canyon Open Space Preserve

== See also ==
- Rancho El Escorpión
- Rock art of the Chumash people
- Burro Flats Painted Cave
- Wildlife corridor
- Santa Monica Mountains Conservancy
