= Challenger Park =

Park in California, United States

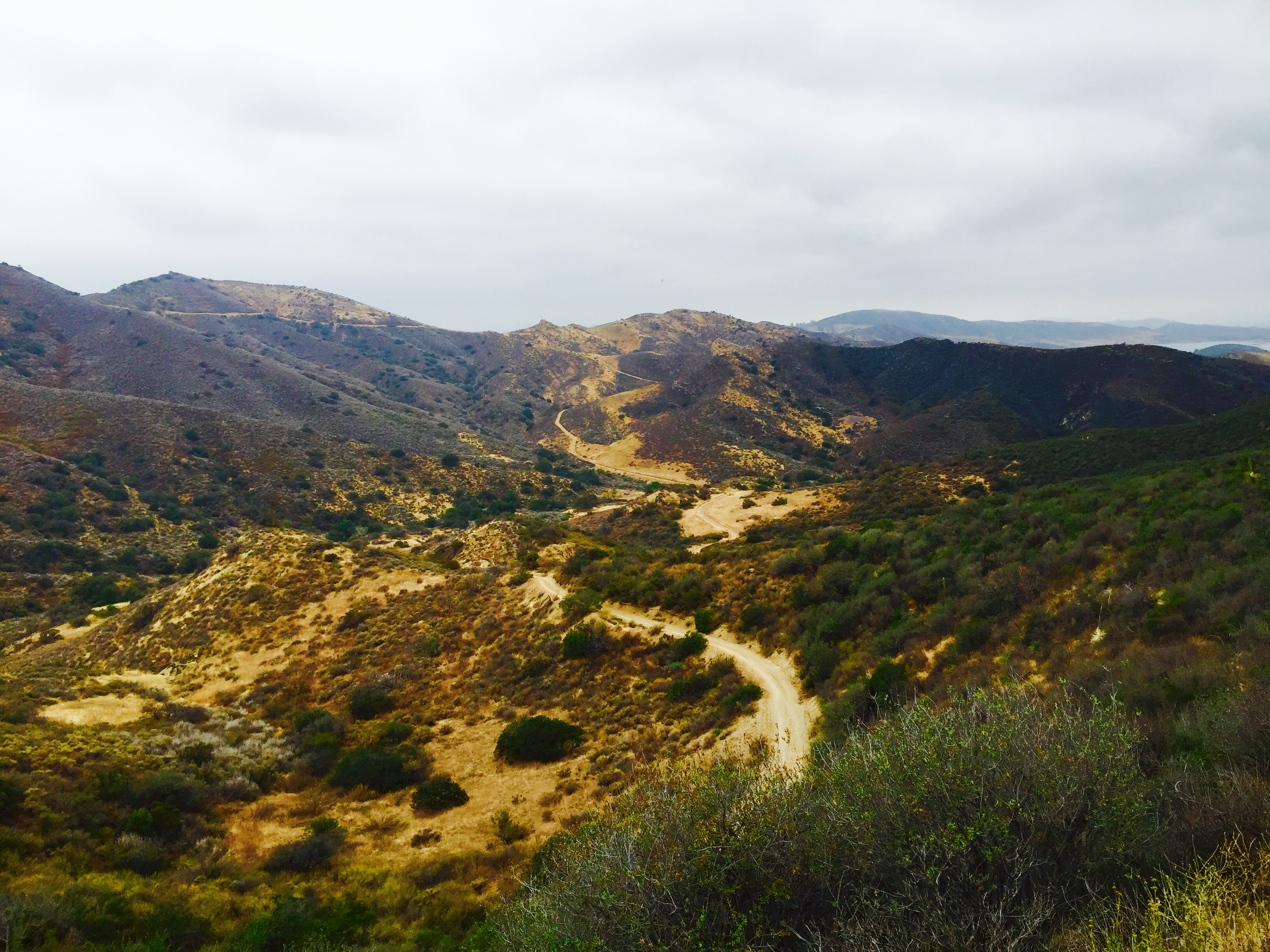
- Looking south with the Simi Hills in the far-back
- Interactive map of Challenger Park
- Type: Open-space park
- Location: Simi Valley, California
- Coordinates: 34°14′30″N 118°46′50″W
- Area: 141.550 acres (57.283 ha)
- Status: Open

Challenger Park is a 141.55-acre open-space park (57.28 ha) located in southern portion of Simi Valley, California, in the Simi Hills. The park is owned and maintained by the Rancho Simi Recreation and Park District. Challenger Park is used for mountain hiking, mountain biking, jogging, and horseback riding but with a focus on the preservation of wildlife habitat. The scenery lining the trails includes extensive oak woodlands, chaparral, and coastal sage scrub. The terrain varies greatly with rolling green hills and steep mountainous hills and canyons. The park offers miles of trails connecting to Long Canyon, Oak Canyon, Trough Canyon, Lone Oak Canyon, and other adjoining open-space nature areas in the southern section of the Simi Valley. There is a fairly easy hike to Thousand Oaks, California, via Long Canyon trails. To get to Oak Canyon, Old Windmill Park and Coyote Hills Park, you must cross Long Canyon Road. Fences run along the Long Canyon Road with dirt paths. There are also lights at the signals with push buttons for hikers, and raised buttons for equestrians. Adjacent to Challenger Park is also Bridle Trails, a private hiking area. There are scenic views of the City of Simi Valley from the park and it is a native habitat for numerous species of animals, including mule deer, mountain lions, coyotes, rattlesnakes, crawdads, California king-snakes, grey foxes, bobcats, as well as red-tailed hawks, barn owls, and numerous other raptors.

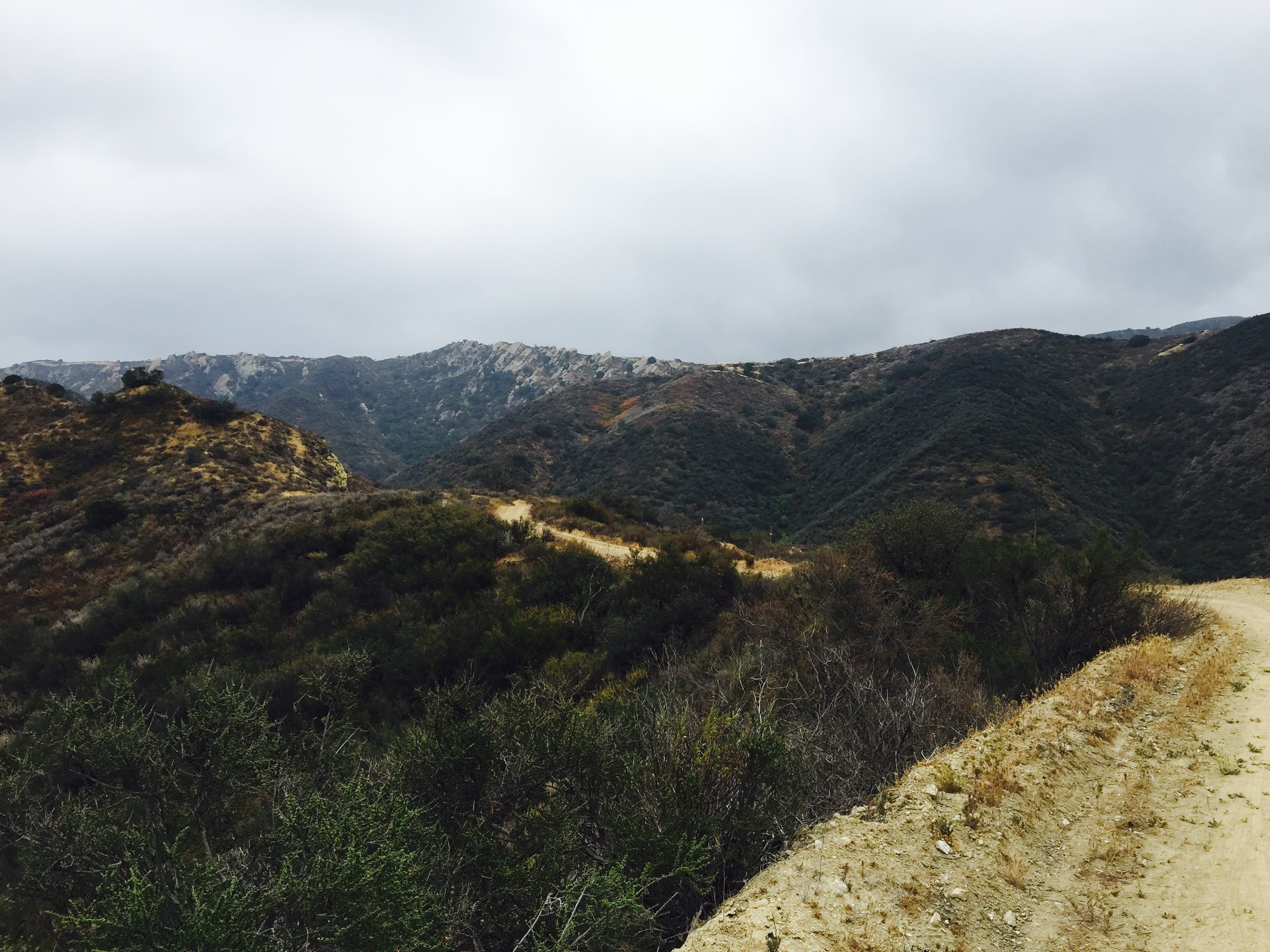
One of many trails in Challenger Park

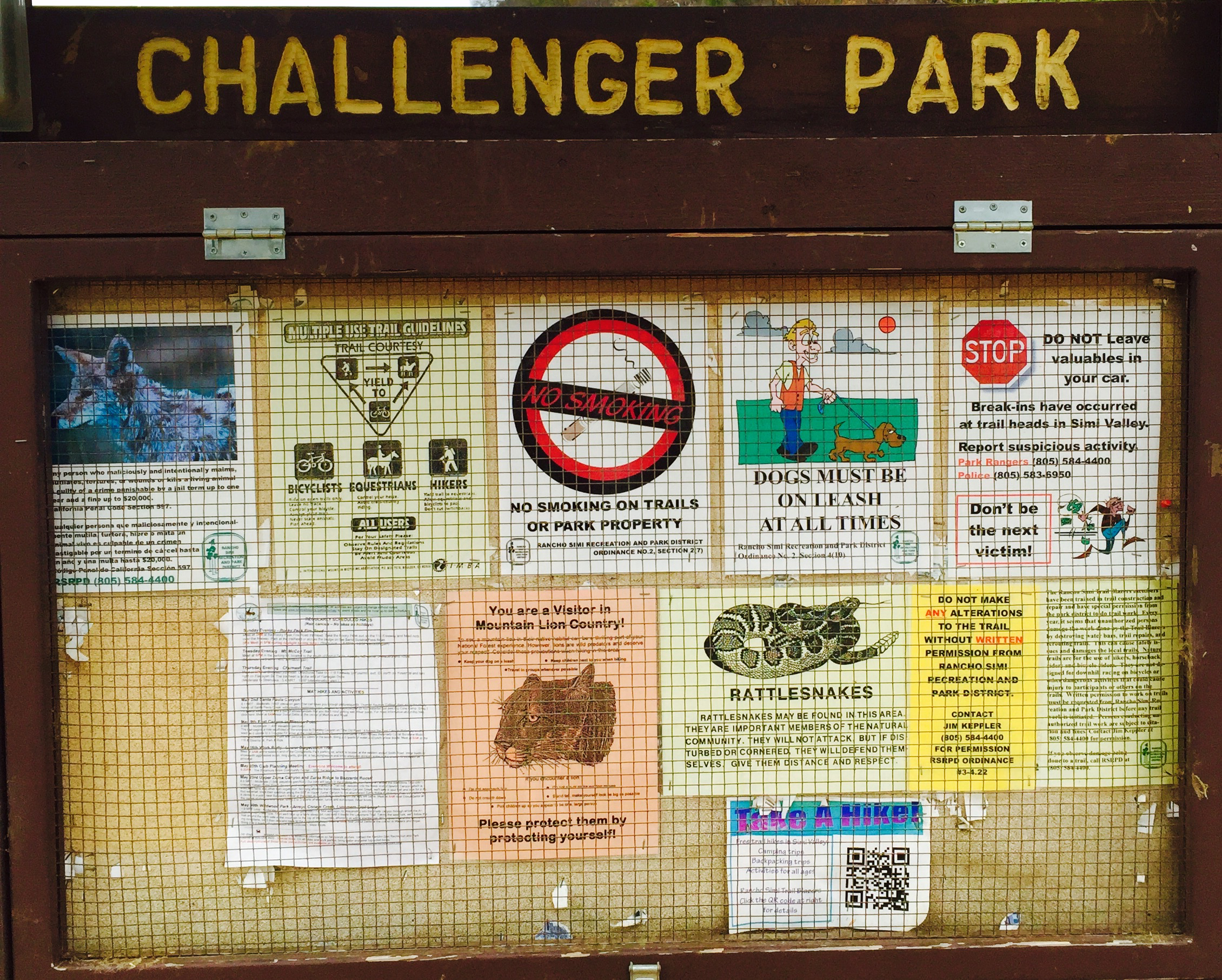
Warning sign at the parking lot

From California State Route 118, take the First Street exit in Simi Valley and continue south, turn right if coming from the west and turn left if from the east. Follow this road for 2.8 miles and then turn left into the Challenger Park parking lot, just past the intersection with Stonebrook. From California State Route 23, take the Olsen Road exit in Thousand Oaks, California, and go northeast for nearly 2 miles to Wood Ranch Parkway. Turn right on Wood Ranch and go approximately two miles to the junction with Long Canyon Road. Then turn left onto Long Canyon Road and follow the road for 1.7 miles. Challenger Park will be on the right, shortly before Long Canyon Road becomes First Street in South Simi Valley. The address is 105 Challenger Park Road, Simi Valley, CA 93065.
