= Bell Canyon Park =

Park in the American state of California

Coordinates: 34°12′05″N 118°39′48″W

Bell Canyon Park is a large open-space regional park located in the Simi Hills at the western end of the San Fernando Valley in West Hills, Los Angeles and Bell Canyon, California. Bell Creek, a primary tributary to the Los Angeles River, flows through the park with riparian zone vegetation along its natural banks. The geographic landmark Escorpión Peak (Castle Peak) is high above it to the south in adjacent El Escorpión Park.

== Trails ==
Bell Canyon Park has trails along riparian Bell Creek and upstream beside the Bell Canyon community. Trails have junctions to connect with El Escorpión Park and Upper Las Virgenes Canyon Open Space Preserve and their miles of trail networks. A secondary route to the top of Escorpión Peak (Castle Peak) begins in the park also. The peak and both other parks are adjacent directly to the south of Bell Canyon Park. The trails are available for walking, hiking, mountain biking, rock climbing, and equestrian riding.

== Access ==
Access to the park and parking is off Bell Canyon Boulevard (Bell Canyon Road) near the intersection with Overland Drive, west of Valley Circle Boulevard in West Hills, Los Angeles 91307 and in the lot in the community of Bell Canyon. The park is open from sunrise to sunset, 7 days a week. Rattlesnakes live in the area, requiring observant footfalls and handholds. Unauthorized motor vehicles and motorbikes are not permitted. The park's land, with public access via trails only, extends upstream past the 'guard-gated' road into the Bell Canyon community to junctions with other trails. Bell Canyon Park is operated by the Los Angeles Department of Recreation and Parks.

== History ==
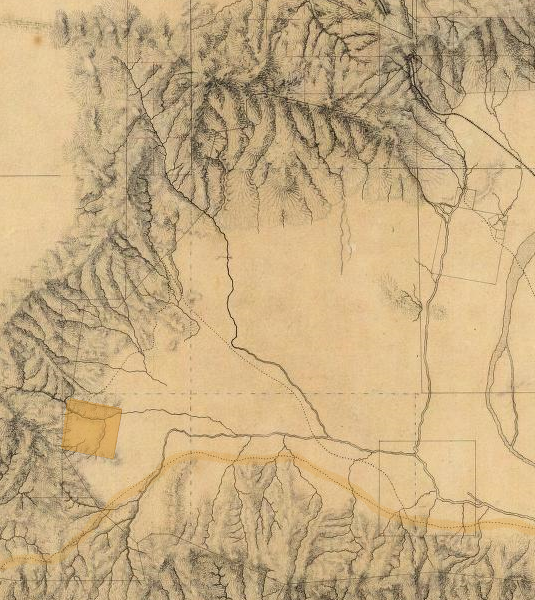
Southwestern San Fernando Valley, from 1880 map of Los Angeles topography, showing Rancho El Escorpión.

The area was inhabited for around 8,000 years by Native Americans of the Chumash-Ventureño and Tongva-Fernandeño tribes that lived and traded in the Simi Hills and close to tributaries of the Los Angeles River. A village, Hu'wam, of the Chumash-Ventureños, was located at the base of Escorpión Peak (Castle Peak) along present Bell Creek near the mouth of Bell Canyon. It was a meeting and trading place for them with the Tongva-Fernandeño and Tataviam-Fernandeño indigenous people.

In 1798 the land became the property of the 'new' Spanish Mission San Fernando Rey de España (Mission San Fernando). In 1845 a Mexican land grant established Rancho El Escorpión here, one of the few granted to Native Americans. The former adobe rancho buildings were located within the current park (adobes existed 1840s-1960s). The rancho was purchased by George Platt in 1912, becoming the Platt Ranch in 1912.

== Adjacent parks ==
- El Escorpión Park
- Upper Las Virgenes Canyon Open Space Preserve

== See also ==
- Burro Flats Painted Cave
- Santa Monica Mountains Conservancy
- Wildlife corridor
- Rancho El Escorpión
- List of parks in Los Angeles
