= China Flat =

China Flat may refer to:

- China Flat (Santa Monica Mountains), a plateau in Ventura County, California
- Willow Creek, California, a census-designated place in Humboldt County, California
