= Arroyo Calabasas =

Arroyo Calabasas ('Calabasas Creek')
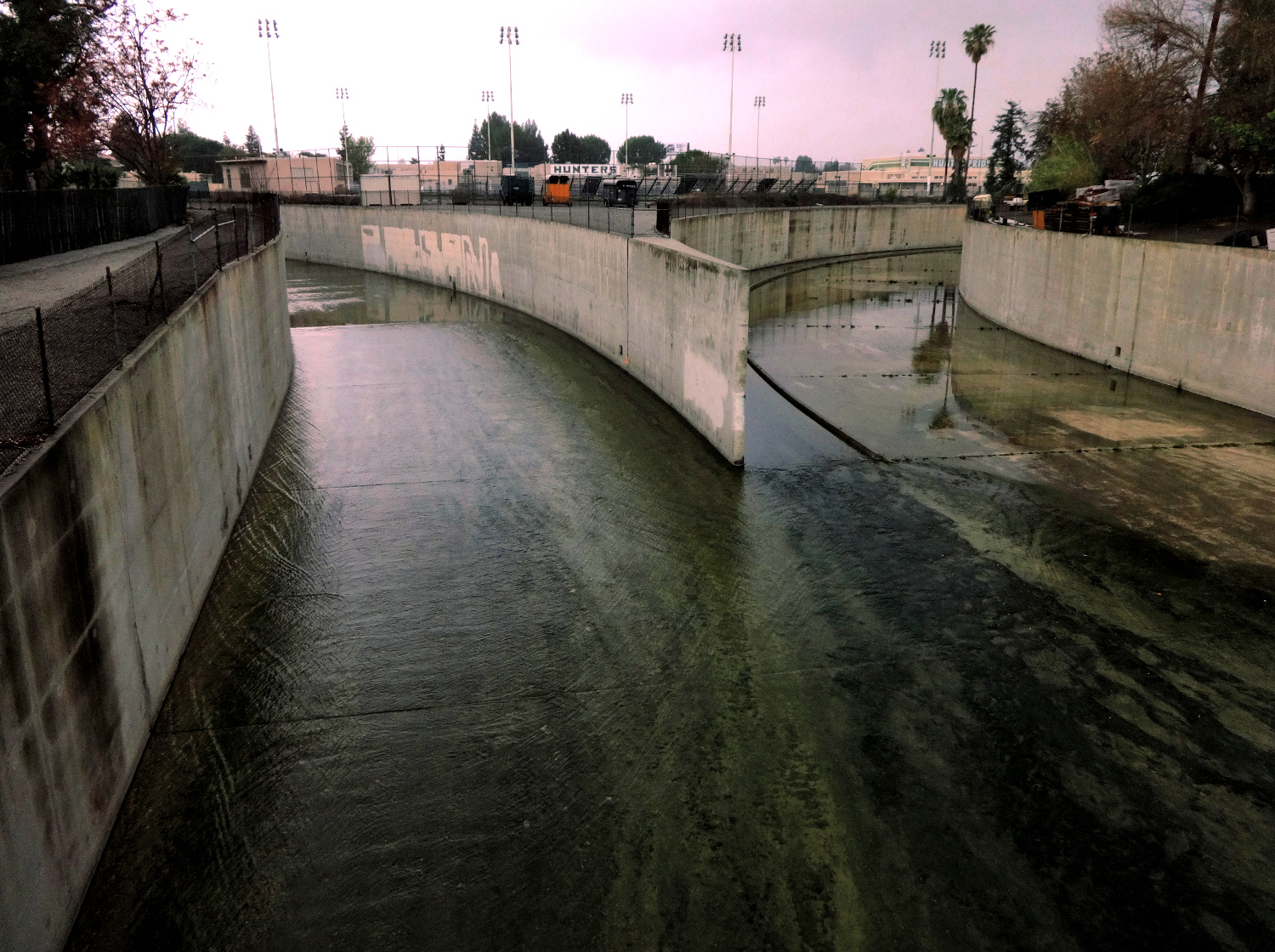

Location
- Country: United States

Physical characteristics
- Source
  - location: Calabasas, California
- Mouth
  - location: Los Angeles River, California
  - coordinates: 34.1952°N 118.601838°W
- Basin size: Santa Monica Mountains, Simi Hills, southwest San Fernando Valley

Arroyo Calabasas (also known as Calabasas Creek) is a 7.0-mile-long (11.3 km) tributary of the Los Angeles River, in the southwestern San Fernando Valley area of Los Angeles County in California.

== Route ==
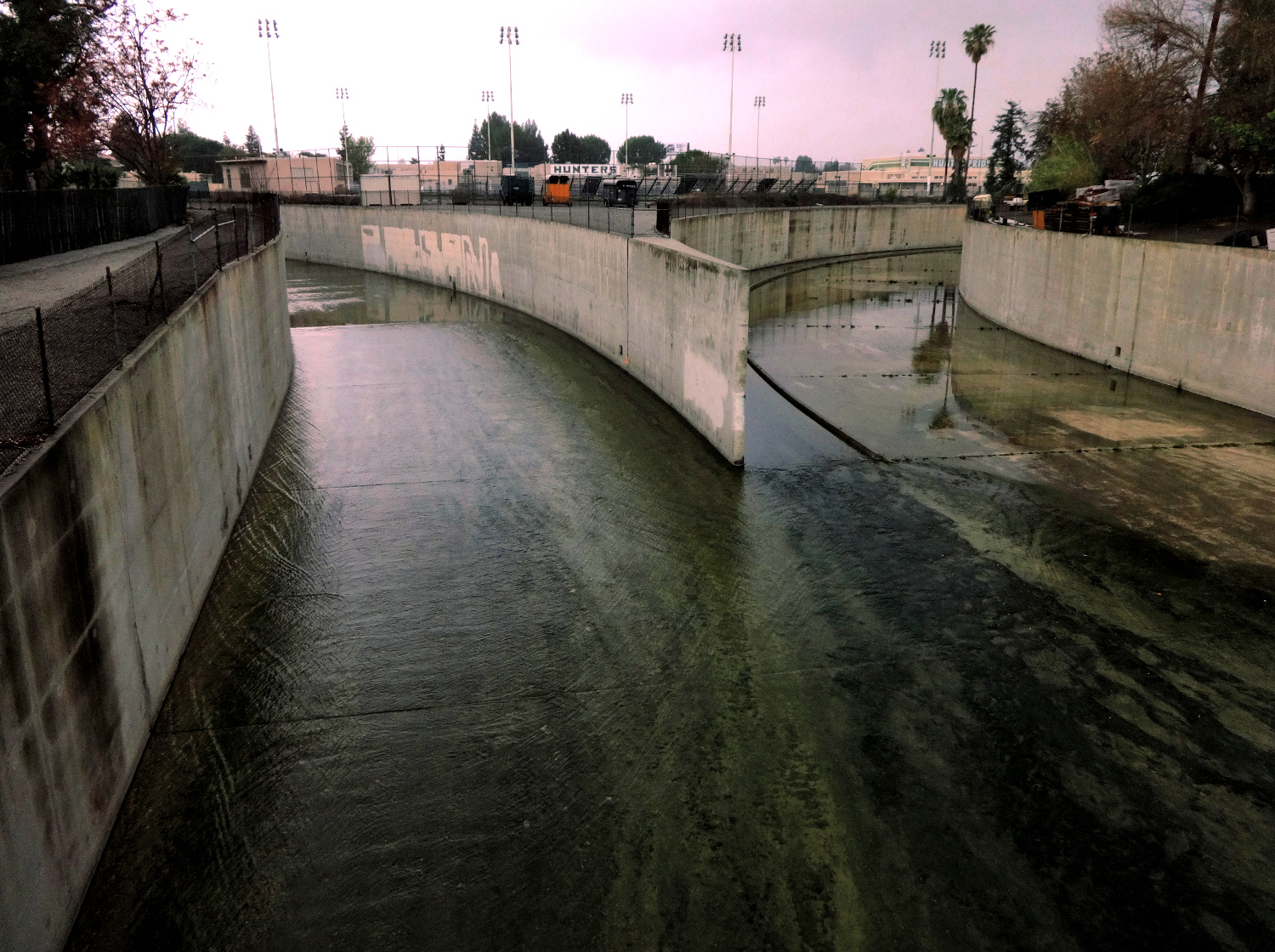
The Arroyo Calabasas (left) and Bell Creek (right) join to form the Los Angeles River

The stream begins with the merging of: Dry Canyon Creek from a Santa Monica Mountains watershed and McCoy Canyon Creek from a Simi Hills (Hidden Hills and Upper Las Virgenes Canyon Open Space Preserve) watershed, near the Leonis Adobe in the town of Calabasas.

Arroyo Calabasas flows northeast through Woodland Hills and Canoga Park. In Canoga Park it joins Bell Creek, directly east of Canoga Park High School beside Vanowen Avenue. The confluence marks the "headwaters" of the Los Angeles River, 34.1952°N 118.601838°W.

The flow of Arroyo Calabasas is entirely encased in a concrete flood control channel.

== Crossings ==
From mouth to source (year built in parentheses):

- Vanowen Street (1964)
- Westfield Topanga Parking Lot (1964)
- California State Route 27 - North Topanga Canyon Boulevard (1962)
- Kittridge Street [Pedestrian Bridge]
- Victory Boulevard (1966)
- Sylvan Street [Private Pedestrian Bridge]
- Shoup Avenue (1964)
- Oxnard Street (1963)
- Fallbrook Avenue (1961)
- Burbank Boulevard (1968)
- Woodlake Avenue (1968)
- Mariano Street (1968)
- Canzonet Street (1968)
- Dry Canyon Creek enters from south
- Valley Circle Boulevard (1962)
- McCoy Canyon Creek enters from west

== See also ==
- Source (river or stream) - a.k.a. watershed and headwaters
- Confluence - a.k.a. "headwaters"
- Drainage basin - a.k.a. "watershed"
