= Bridle Path, Simi Valley, California =

Community in Simi Valley, California

Coordinates: 34.24492°N 118.79092°W

Bridle Path is a community in the southwestern area of the City of Simi Valley, in Ventura County, Southern California.

The residential development is located in the north−central Simi Hills, east of the southern end of First Street as it turns into Long Canyon Road, and east of the Wood Ranch community.

The area was developed in the mid-1970s, during one of Simi Valley's housing development booms. The equestrian community is one of few areas within the city that is zoned for residents to keep horses on their property,

The Bridle Path Homeowners Association (HOA) includes owners of the 630 homes within the original community. Nearby neighborhoods along First Street to Fitzgerald Road are sometimes identified as part of the Bridle Path neighborhood.

In November 2018, most of the Bridle Path Mountain Park was burned during the Woolsey Fire. Areas of Bridle Path were placed under voluntary evacuation, while nearby neighborhoods of Wood Ranch and Long Canyon were placed under mandatory evacuation.

== Recreation ==
The 1,700 acres (690 ha) Mountain Park, a private homeowners association open-space park is accessible to paying members of the Bridle Path Homeowners Association.

There also are public parks and open-spaces in the area, including Coyote Hills Park, Chumash Park, and Wood Ranch Open Space. The expansive Cheeseboro and Palo Comado Canyon open space park is to the south, via the Montgomery Fire Road. Simi Peak is located within it.

=== Ecology ===
The Bridle Path community is adjacent to notable Simi Hills wildlife corridors that have an abundance of wildlife species. They include bobcats, mountain lions, skunks, ducks, opossums, deer, raptors, rabbits, coyotes, grey foxes, barn owls, rattle snakes, American bull frogs, and other fauna of Simi Valley.

The nearby natural habitats include chaparral, oak woodlands, and grasslands.

== See also ==
- Simi Hills−related topics
- Flora of the Santa Monica Mountains + adjacent Simi Hills.
