= Simi Peak =

Mountain in the American state of California

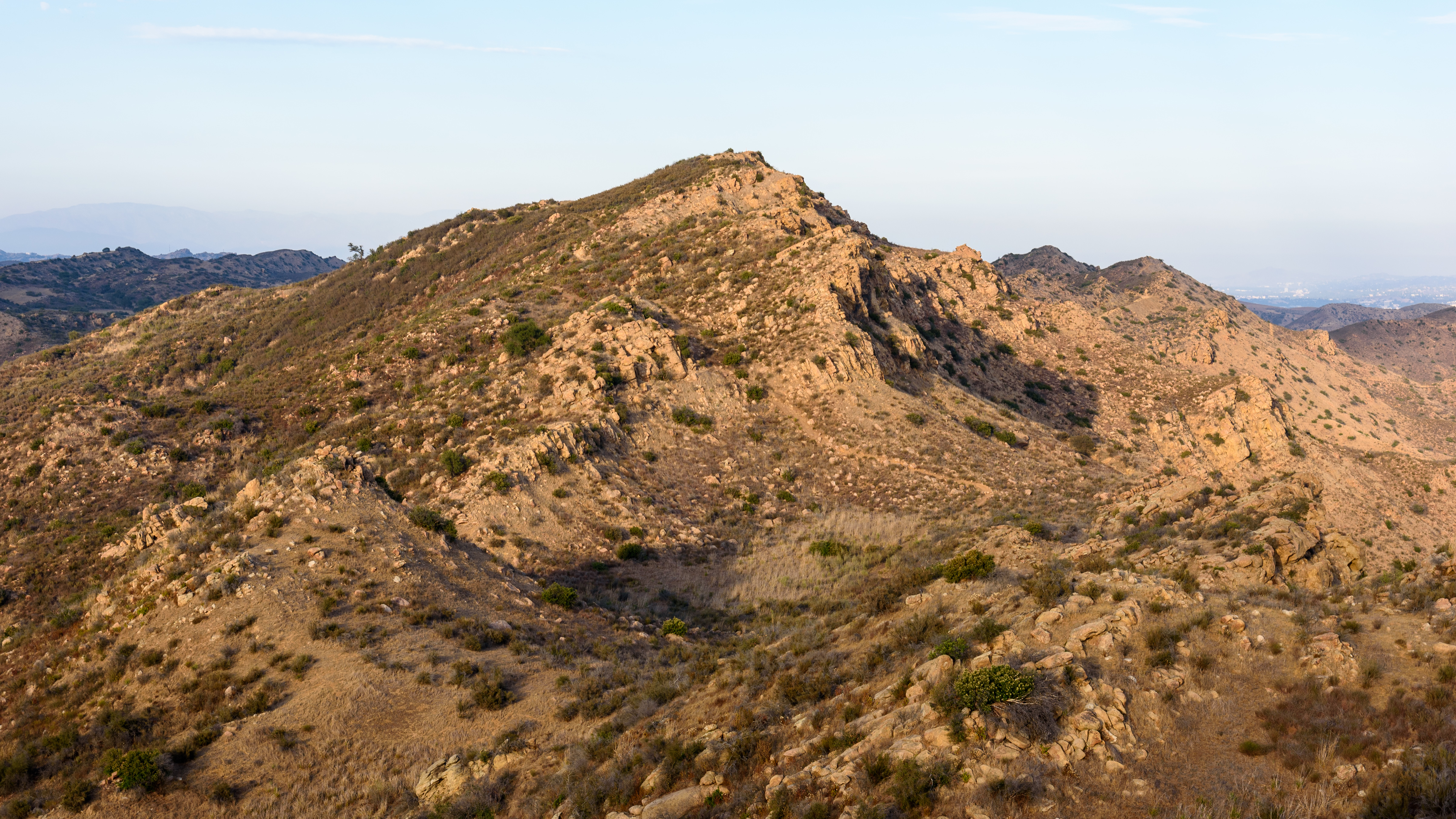
- Simi Peak viewed from the west

Highest point
- Elevation: 2,405 ft (733 m) NAVD 88
- Prominence: 816 ft (249 m)
- Coordinates: 34°12′16″N 118°46′51″W

Geography
- Location within California
- Location: Ventura County California, U.S.
- Parent range: Simi Hills
- Topo map: USGS Thousand Oaks

Simi Peak is the highest peak in the Simi Hills of Southern California, at 2,405 feet (733 m).

== Geography ==
Simi Peak is located in eastern Ventura County, California, near the cities of Simi Valley to the north, and Thousand Oaks to the west.

=== Nearby peaks ===
Chatsworth Peak is a peak that is also located in Simi Hills, on the far eastern edge. Escorpión Peak (Castle Peak) is closer in the hills, at 1,475 feet (450 m) and located in El Escorpión Park to the east.

== Parks; and recreation ==
The peak is in the Cheeseboro and Palo Comado Canyons Open Space park, part of the NPS Santa Monica Mountains National Recreation Area system. Simi Peak is accessible by trail, with trailheads in the towns of Simi Valley, Thousand Oaks, and Agoura Hills, and by trails connecting from the Upper Las Virgenes Canyon Open Space Preserve.

== See also ==
- Index: Simi Hills
