= Chalk Hills =

Mountain range in Southern California

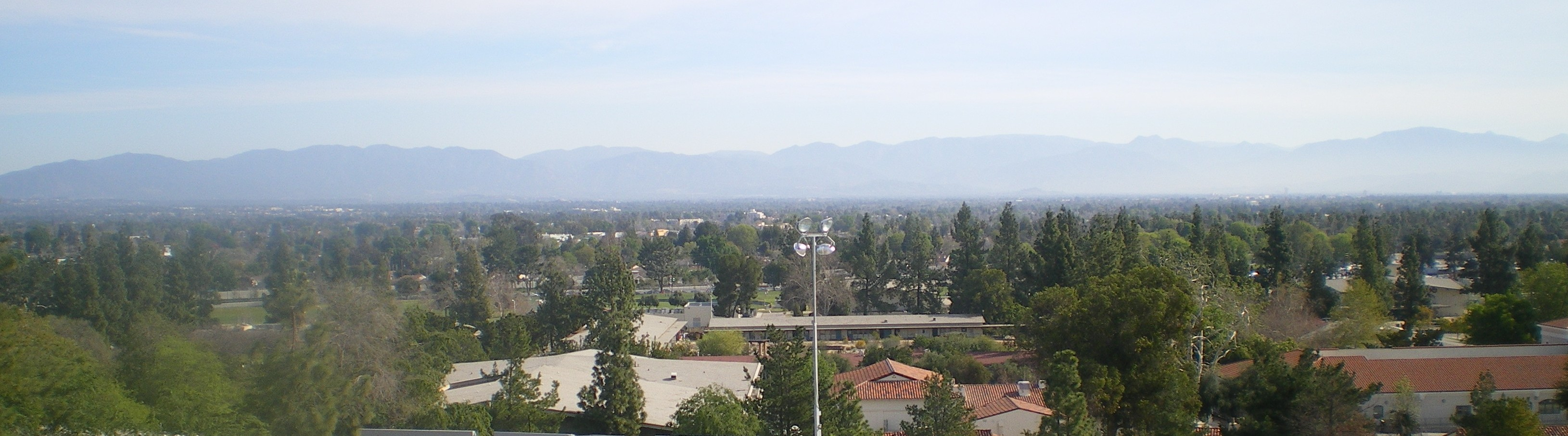
- View from Chalk Hills northeast across San Fernando Valley to San Gabriel Mountains.

Highest point
- Elevation: 1,086 ft (331 m)

Geography
- Location within California
- Country: United States
- State: California
- Region: Southern California
- District: Woodland Hills
- Municipality: City of Los Angeles
- Range coordinates: 34°10′16.019″N 118°34′48.309″W
- Borders on: Santa Monica Mountains
- Topo map: USGS Canoga Park
- Biome: California chaparral and woodlands

The Chalk Hills are a north–south-running low 'mountain' range in the San Fernando Valley perpendicular to and adjoining the Santa Monica Mountains. They are located in the Woodland Hills District of the City of Los Angeles in Southern California. They run between DeSoto and Winnetka Avenues, from south of Ventura Boulevard north to near Victory Boulevard.

== Geography ==
The Chalk Hills host an expansive, low-density, semi-urban suburb of the San Fernando Valley.

Los Angeles Pierce College is located on the northern portion of the Chalk Hills. Historically the free-flowing Los Angeles River ran around that portion. U.S. Route 101, the Ventura Freeway, cuts deeply through the southern part since the 1960s.

The range has a white soil and bedrock, resembling chalk, and was a 'white landform' Valley landmark before suburban development on it in the 1960s. The white rocks are marine shales. Geologists are unsure of its relationship with other rock formations in Southern California, although Thomas Dibblee has identified it as a member of the Sisquoc Formation. A small remnant California oak woodland plant community remains in an undeveloped southeastern area of the Pierce campus.

== Local ranges ==
- Santa Monica Mountains — adjacent on south
- Simi Hills — to west
- Santa Susana Mountains — to north, across valley
- San Gabriel Mountains — to northeast, across valley
- Verdugo Mountains — to east, across valley

== See also ==
- Index: Mountain ranges of Los Angeles County
