= San Fernando Valley =

Valley in California

- Valle de San Fernando (Spanish)
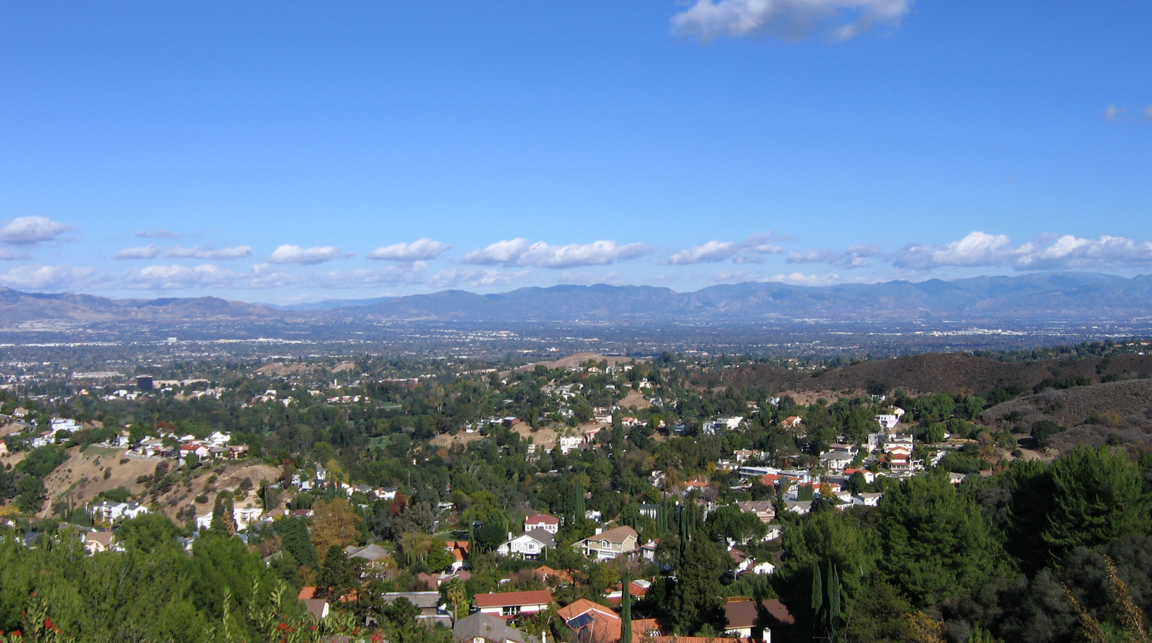
- The San Fernando Valley looking northeast; from the top of Topanga Overlook Park above Woodland Hills in the foreground

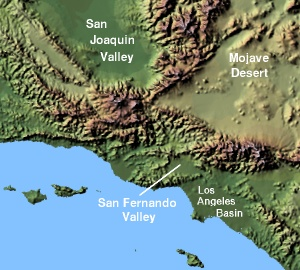
- San Fernando Valley
- Area: 260 square miles (670 km^{2})

Naming
- Native name: El Valle de Santa Catalina de Bolonia de los Encinos (Spanish)

Geography
- Location: California
- Population centers: Los Angeles, Burbank, Glendale, Calabasas, Hidden Hills, San Fernando
- Borders on: Santa Susana Mountains (northwest), Simi Hills (west), Santa Monica Mountains and Chalk Hills (south), Verdugo Mountains (east), San Gabriel Mountains (northeast)
- Coordinates: 34.25°N 118.45°W

The San Fernando Valley, known locally as the Valley, is an urbanized valley in Los Angeles County, California. Situated to the north of the Los Angeles Basin, it comprises a large portion of Los Angeles, the incorporated cities of Burbank, Calabasas, Glendale, Hidden Hills and San Fernando, plus several unincorporated areas. It has a population of about 1.8 million spread over 260 square miles (670 km^{2}). The valley is the home of Warner Bros. Studios, Walt Disney Studios, and the Universal Studios Hollywood theme park.

== Geography ==
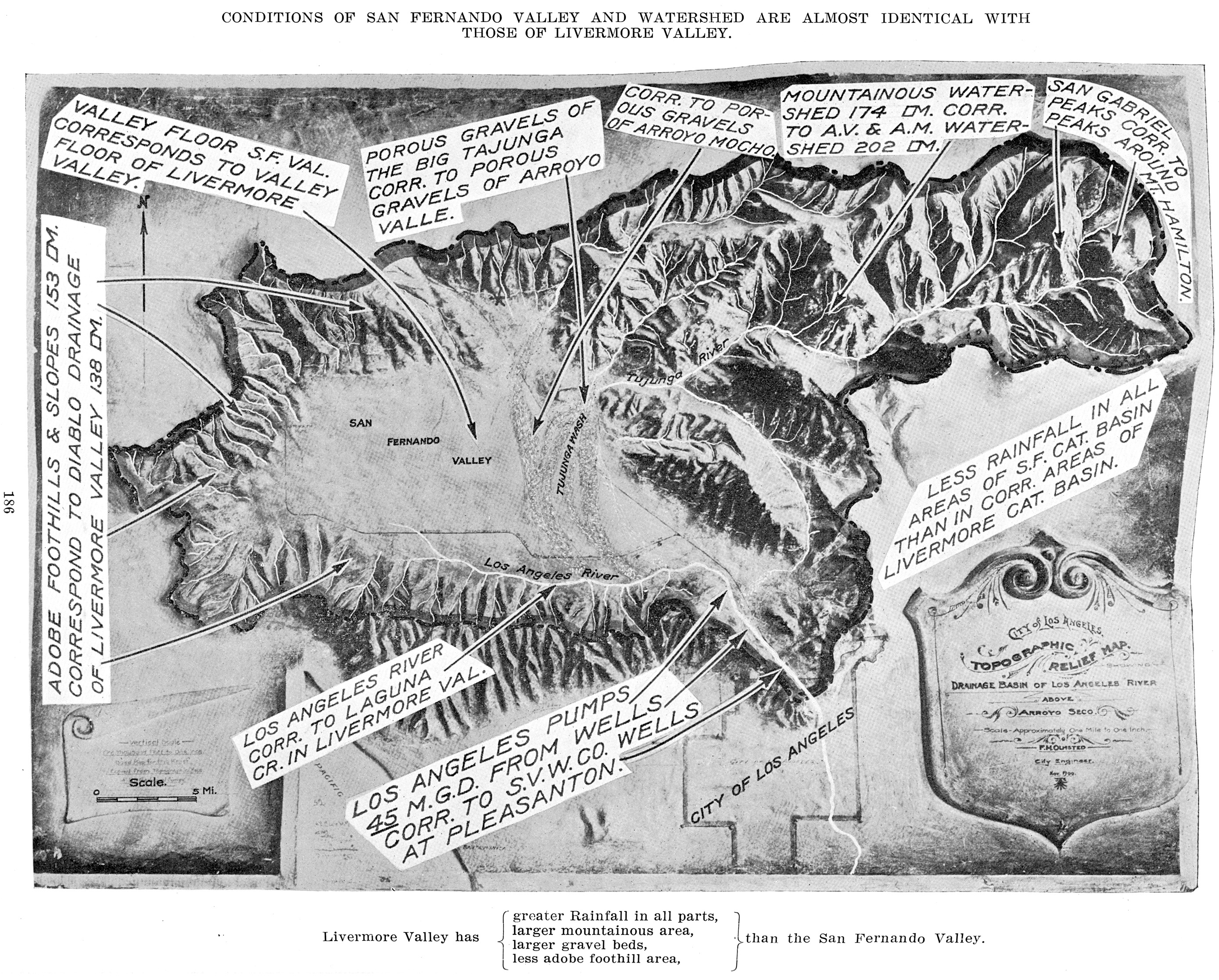
San Fernando vs Livermore valleys water comparison map by William Mulholland, 1912

The San Fernando has an area of 260 square miles (670 km^{2}), bounded by the San Gabriel Mountains in the northeast, the Verdugo Mountains in the east, the Santa Monica Mountains and Chalk Hills in the south, the Simi Hills in the west, and the Santa Susana Mountains in the northwest. The northern Sierra Pelona Mountains, northwestern Topatopa Mountains, southern Santa Ana Mountains, and Downtown Los Angeles skyscrapers can be seen from higher neighborhoods, passes, roads and parks in the San Fernando Valley.

The Los Angeles River begins at the confluence of Calabasas Creek (Arroyo Calabasas) and Bell Creek (Escorpión Creek), between Canoga Park High School and Owensmouth Avenue (just north of Vanowen Street) in Canoga Park. These creeks' headwaters are in the Santa Monica Calabasas foothills, the Simi Hills' Hidden Hills, Santa Susana Field Laboratory, and Santa Susana Pass Park lands. The river flows eastward along the southern regions of the Valley. One of the river's two unpaved sections can be found at the Sepulveda Basin. A seasonal river, the Tujunga Wash, drains much of the western facing San Gabriel Mountains and passes into and then through the Hansen Dam Recreation Center in Lake View Terrace. It flows south along the Verdugo Mountains through the eastern communities of the Valley to join the Los Angeles River in Studio City. Other notable tributaries of the river include Dayton Creek, Caballero Creek, Bull Creek, Pacoima Wash, and Verdugo Wash. The elevation of the floor of the Valley varies from about 600 ft (180 m) to 1,200 ft (370 m) above sea level.

Most of the San Fernando Valley is within the jurisdiction of the City of Los Angeles, although a few other incorporated cities are located within the Valley as well: Burbank is in the southeastern corner of the Valley, and San Fernando, which is completely surrounded by the city of Los Angeles, is near the northern end of the Valley. Universal City, an enclave in the southern part of the Valley, is an unincorporated area housing the Universal Studios filming lot and theme park. Mulholland Drive, which runs along the ridgeline of the Santa Monica Mountains, marks the boundary between the Valley and the communities of Hollywood and the Los Angeles Westside. The San Fernando Valley has connections to other regions: the Santa Clarita Valley via Newhall Pass, the Westside via Sepulveda Pass, Hollywood via Cahuenga Pass, Simi Valley via Santa Susana Pass, and the Crescenta Valley via Interstate 210.

=== Habitat ===
The Valley's natural habitat is a "temperate grasslands, savannas, and shrublands biome" of grassland, oak savanna, and chaparral shrub types of plant community habitats, along with lush riparian plants along the river, creeks, and springs. In this Mediterranean climate, post-1790s European agriculture for the mission's support consisted of grapes, figs, olives, and general garden crops.

=== Climate ===
The San Fernando Valley has a subtropical/hot-summer Mediterranean climate, with long, hot, dry summers, and short, mild winters, with chilly nights and sporadic rainfall. Due to its relatively inland location and other factors, summer days are typically hotter and winter nights typically colder than in the Los Angeles Basin. More recently, statewide droughts in California have further strained the San Fernando Valley's and Los Angeles County's water security.

Climate data for Burbank, California (at Burbank Valley Pump)
Month	Jan	Feb	Mar	Apr	May	Jun	Jul	Aug	Sep	Oct	Nov	Dec	Year
Record high °F (°C)	92 (33)	92 (33)	98 (37)	105 (41)	107 (42)	111 (44)	114 (46)	111 (44)	114 (46)	108 (42)	102 (39)	95 (35)	114 (46)
Mean daily maximum °F (°C)	67.5 (19.7)	68.7 (20.4)	70.4 (21.3)	73.7 (23.2)	76.6 (24.8)	81.4 (27.4)	88.3 (31.3)	89.0 (31.7)	87.2 (30.7)	80.9 (27.2)	73.7 (23.2)	67.9 (19.9)	77.1 (25.1)
Mean daily minimum °F (°C)	41.7 (5.4)	43.5 (6.4)	45.7 (7.6)	48.9 (9.4)	53.5 (11.9)	57.3 (14.1)	61.2 (16.2)	61.4 (16.3)	59.2 (15.1)	53.3 (11.8)	46.0 (7.8)	41.6 (5.3)	51.1 (10.6)
Record low °F (°C)	22 (−6)	27 (−3)	23 (−5)	32 (0)	39 (4)	43 (6)	45 (7)	46 (8)	43 (6)	33 (1)	29 (−2)	22 (−6)	22 (−6)
Average precipitation inches (mm)	3.35 (85)	3.84 (98)	2.84 (72)	1.17 (30)	0.27 (6.9)	0.07 (1.8)	0.01 (0.25)	0.10 (2.5)	0.20 (5.1)	0.60 (15)	1.51 (38)	2.34 (59)	16.29 (414)

Climate data for Woodland Hills, Los Angeles
Month	Jan	Feb	Mar	Apr	May	Jun	Jul	Aug	Sep	Oct	Nov	Dec	Year
Record high °F (°C)	93 (34)	94 (34)	101 (38)	105 (41)	113 (45)	113 (45)	119 (48)	116 (47)	121 (49)	110 (43)	101 (38)	96 (36)	121 (49)
Mean daily maximum °F (°C)	67 (19)	69 (21)	71 (22)	77 (25)	80 (27)	87 (31)	93 (34)	95 (35)	90 (32)	83 (28)	73 (23)	67 (19)	79 (26)
Mean daily minimum °F (°C)	41 (5)	42 (6)	43 (6)	45 (7)	49 (9)	53 (12)	56 (13)	57 (14)	55 (13)	50 (10)	43 (6)	39 (4)	48 (9)
Record low °F (°C)	19 (−7)	18 (−8)	26 (−3)	30 (−1)	33 (1)	36 (2)	42 (6)	42 (6)	38 (3)	27 (−3)	23 (−5)	20 (−7)	18 (−8)
Average precipitation inches (mm)	4.27 (108)	4.26 (108)	3.63 (92)	0.85 (22)	0.30 (7.6)	0.06 (1.5)	0.02 (0.51)	0.16 (4.1)	0.26 (6.6)	0.60 (15)	1.47 (37)	2.32 (59)	18.20 (462)

== History ==
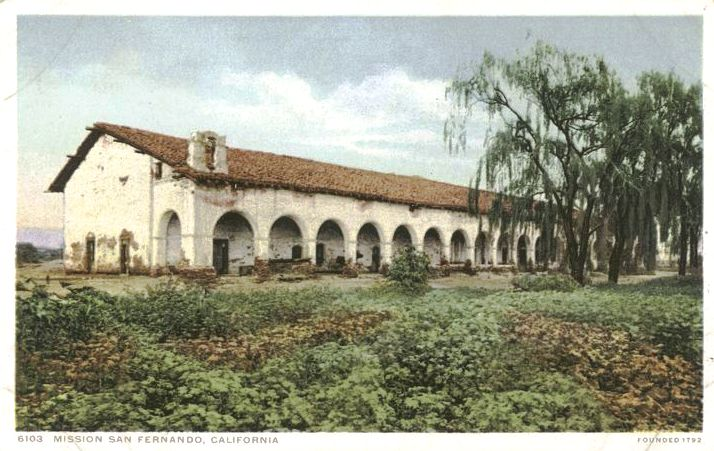
Mission San Fernando: in a circa 1900 postcard

=== Pre-California statehood ===
The valley was a center of "the crossroads of cultures and languages, including the Tongva, Fernandeño, and Chumash." The Tongva, later known as the Gabrieleño Mission Indians after colonization, the Tataviam to the north, and Chumash to the west, had lived and thrived in the valley and its arroyos for over 8,000 years. They had numerous settlements, and trading and hunting camps, before the Spanish arrived in 1769 to settle in the valley, including the village of Pasheeknga.

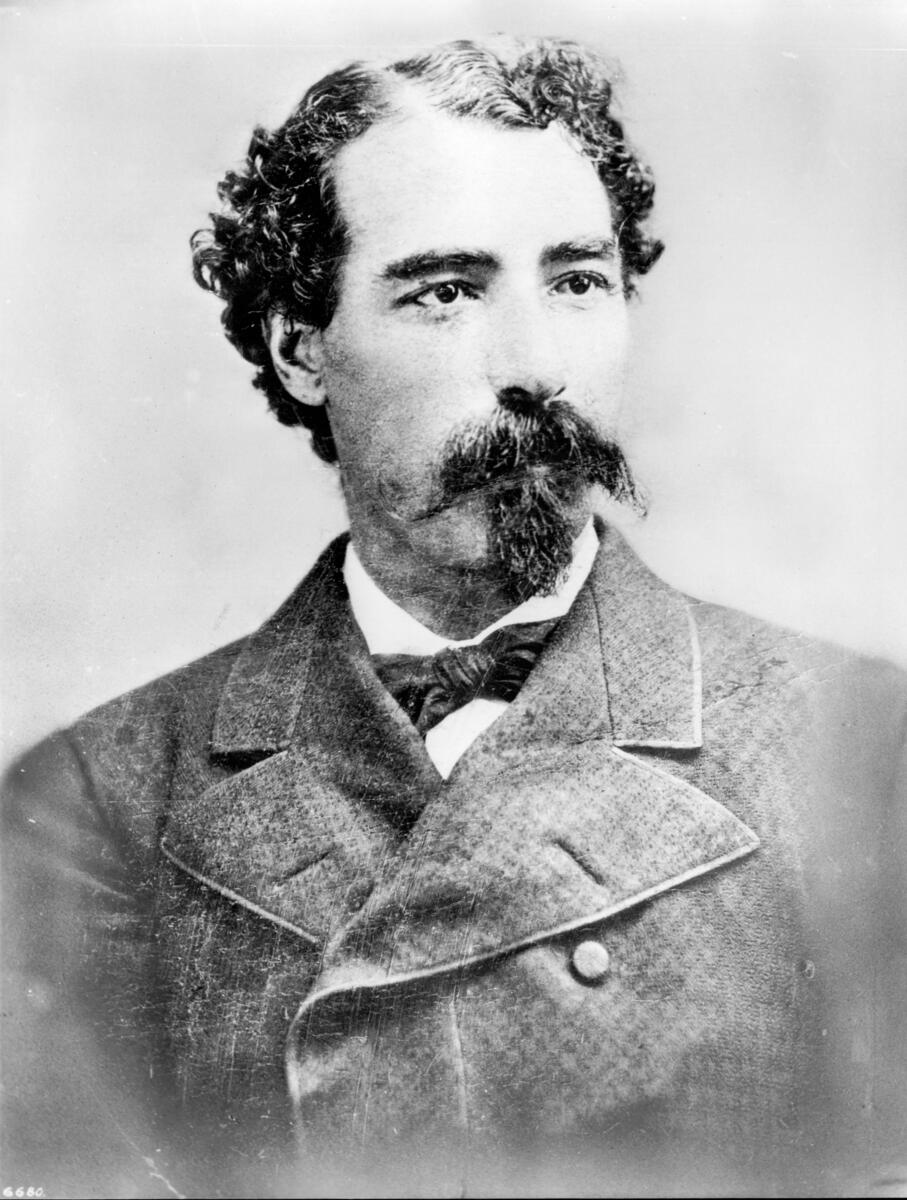
Californio ranchero Eulogio F. de Celis once owned most of the San Fernando Valley.

The first Spanish land grant in the San Fernando Valley (or El Valle de Santa Catalina de Bolonia de los Encinos) was called "Rancho Encino" (present-day Mission Hills on the Camino Viejo before Newhall Pass), in the northern part of the San Fernando Valley. Juan Francisco Reyes built an adobe dwelling beside a or rancheria at natural springs known as Achooykomenga, but the land was soon taken from him so that a mission could be built there. Mission San Fernando Rey de España was established in 1797 as the 17th of the 21 missions. The land trade granted Juan Francisco Reyes the similarly named Rancho Los Encinos, also beside springs (Los Encinos State Historic Park in present-day Encino). Later the Mexican land grants of Rancho El Escorpión (West Hills), Rancho Providencia and Rancho Cahuenga (Burbank), and Rancho Ex-Mission San Fernando (rest of valley) covered the San Fernando Valley.

The Treaty of Cahuenga, ending the Mexican–American War fighting in Alta California, was signed in 1847 by Californios and Americans at Campo de Cahuenga, the Verdugo Family adobe at the entrance to the Cahuenga Pass in the southeast San Fernando Valley (North Hollywood). The 1848 Treaty of Guadalupe Hidalgo ended the entire war.

=== California statehood and beyond ===
The Valley officially became part of the State of California on September 9, 1850, when the California Statehood Act was approved by the federal government. In 1874, dry wheat farming was introduced by J. B. Lankershim and Isaac Van Nuys, which became very productive for their San Fernando Homestead Association that owned the southern half of the valley. In 1876, they sent the first wheat shipment from both San Pedro Harbor and from the United States to Europe.

=== 20th century ===
==== Aqueduct ====
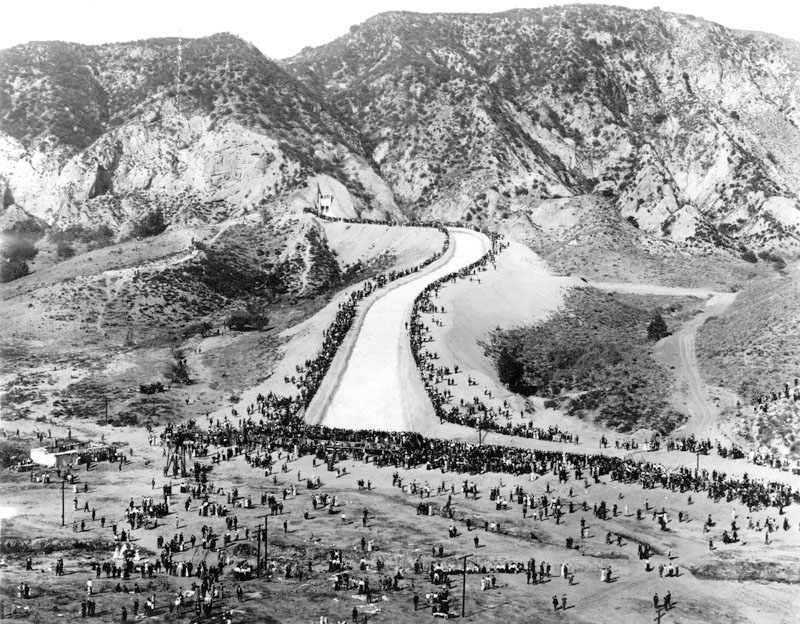
Crowds gather to see the first water reaching the valley via the new aqueduct.

Through the late-19th-century court decision Los Angeles v. Pomeroy, Los Angeles had won the rights to all surface flow water atop an aquifer beneath the valley, without it being within the city limits. San Fernando Valley farmers offered to buy the surplus aqueduct water, but the federal legislation that enabled the construction of the aqueduct prohibited Los Angeles from selling the water outside of the city limits. This induced several independent towns surrounding Los Angeles to vote on and approve annexation to the city so that they could connect to the municipal water system. These rural areas became part of Los Angeles in 1915. The aqueduct water shifted farming in the area from dry crops, such as wheat, to irrigated crops, such as corn, beans, squash, and cotton; orchards of apricots, persimmons, and walnuts; and major citrus groves of oranges and lemons. They continued until the next increment of development converted land use, with postwar suburbanization leaving only a few enclaves, such as the "open-air museum" groves at the Orcutt Ranch Park and CSUN campus.

==== Developments ====
In 1909, the Suburban Homes Company, a syndicate led by H. J. Whitley, general manager of the board of control, along with Harry Chandler, Harrison Gray Otis, M. H. Sherman, and Otto F. Brant purchased 48,000 acres (190 km^{2}; 75 mi^{2}) of the Farming and Milling Company for $2,500,000. Henry E. Huntington extended his Pacific Electric Railway (Red Cars) through the Valley to Owensmouth (now Canoga Park). The Suburban Home Company laid out plans for roads and the towns of Van Nuys, Reseda (Marian), and Canoga Park (Owensmouth). The rural areas were annexed into the city of Los Angeles in 1915. Laurel Canyon and Lankershim in 1923, Sunland in 1926, La Tuna Canyon in 1926, and the incorporated city of Tujunga in an eight-year process lasting from 1927 to 1935. These annexations more than doubled the area of the city.

Two Valley cities incorporated independently from Los Angeles: Burbank and San Fernando in 1911. Universal City remains an unincorporated enclave that is home to Universal Studios and became home to Universal CityWalk later in the century. Other unincorporated areas in the Valley include Bell Canyon and Kagel Canyon.

The advent of three new industries in the early 20th century—motion pictures, automobiles, and aircraft—also spurred urbanization and population growth. World War II production and the subsequent postwar boom accelerated this growth so that between 1945 and 1960, the valley's population had quintupled. Los Angeles continued to consolidate its territories in the San Fernando Valley by annexing the former Rancho El Escorpión for Canoga Park-West Hills in 1959, and the huge historic Porter Ranch at the foot of the Santa Susana Mountains for the new planned developments in Porter Ranch in 1965. The additions expanded the Los Angeles portion of San Fernando Valley from the original 169 square miles (438 km^{2}) to 224 square miles (580 km^{2}).

In the late 1970s, there was a proposed east-west freeway labeled SR 64 that would have cut through the center of the Valley from Calabasas in the western end of the Valley to the SR-170 and I-5 freeway interchange in Sun Valley, Los Angeles in the eastern end of the Valley, but local opposition gained traction and the proposed freeway was never approved or built.

==== Pop culture ====
In the 1980s, a distinctive valley youth culture was recognized in the media, particularly in the 1982 Frank Zappa / Moon Zappa song "Valley Girl" and the 1983 film Valley Girl. These helped fix the socio-economic stereotype of the "Valley girl" into the public consciousness, including a distinct Valley accent.

==== Northridge earthquake ====
The 1994 Northridge earthquake struck on January 17 and measured 6.7 on the Moment magnitude scale. It produced the largest ground motions ever recorded in an urban environment and was the first earthquake that had its hypocenter located directly under a U.S. city since the Long Beach earthquake of 1933. It caused the greatest damage in the United States since the 1906 San Francisco earthquake. Although given the name Northridge, the epicenter was located in the community of Reseda, between Arminta and Ingomar streets, just west of Reseda Boulevard. The death toll was 57, and more than 1,500 people were seriously injured. A few days after the earthquake, 9,000 homes and businesses were still without electricity; 20,000 were without gas; and more than 48,500 had little or no water. About 12,500 structures were moderately to severely damaged, which left thousands of people temporarily homeless. Of the 66,546 buildings inspected, 6 percent were severely damaged (red tagged) and 17 percent were moderately damaged (yellow tagged). In addition, damage to several major freeways serving Los Angeles choked the traffic system in the days following the earthquake. Major freeway damage occurred as far away as 25 miles (40 km) from the epicenter. Collapses and other severe damage forced closure of portions of 11 major roads to downtown Los Angeles.

This was the second time in 23 years that the San Fernando Valley had been affected by a strong earthquake. On February 9, 1971, at 6:01 a.m., a magnitude 6.5 event struck about 20 miles (32 km) northeast of the epicenter of the 1994 event in the area of Sylmar. The 1971 earthquake caused 58 fatalities and about 2,000 injuries. At the time, the 1971 San Fernando earthquake was the most destructive event to affect greater Los Angeles since the magnitude-6.3 Long Beach earthquake of 1933.

=== Independence movement ===
The Valley attempted to secede from the city of Los Angeles in 1977, but the state passed a law barring city formation without the approval of the City Council. In 1997, Assemblymen Bob Hertzberg and Tom McClintock helped pass a bill that would make it easier for the Valley to secede by removing the City Council veto. AB 62 was signed into law by Governor Pete Wilson. Meanwhile, a grassroots movement to split the Los Angeles Unified School District (LAUSD) and create new San Fernando Valley–based school districts became the focal point of the desire to leave the city. Though the state rejected the idea of Valley-based districts, it remained an important rallying point for Hertzberg's mayoral campaign, which proved unsuccessful.

=== 21st century ===
By the late 1990s, the San Fernando Valley had become more urban and more ethnically diverse with rising poverty and crime. In 2002, the Valley again tried to secede from the city of Los Angeles and become its own independent, incorporated city to escape Los Angeles' perceived poverty, crime, gang activity, urban decay, and poorly maintained infrastructure. The movement gained some momentum, but Measure F did not receive the necessary votes to pass. Since that unsuccessful secession attempt, a new Van Nuys municipal building (the Marvin Braude San Fernando Valley Constituent Service Center) was built in 2003; the Metro Orange Line opened in October 2005; and 36 new public schools had opened up by 2012.

The NoHo Arts District was established and the name chosen as a reference for its location in North Hollywood and as a play off New York City's arts-centered SoHo District. According to the San Fernando Guide, the change helped develop a "primarily lower to middle-class suburb into ... a collection of art and a home for the artists who ply their trade in the galleries, theaters and dance studios in this small annex."

According to the Lake Balboa Neighborhood Council, from 2002 through November 2007 there was a debate about the official recognition of Lake Balboa as a community by the City of Los Angeles. New community names were not sanctioned by the city until January 2006, when the city adopted a formal community-naming process (City of Los Angeles Council File Number 02 -0196). On November 2, 2007, the City Council of Los Angeles approved a motion renaming a larger portion of Van Nuys to Lake Balboa.

By 2017, numerous urban development projects began in the valley, mainly in the Los Angeles neighborhoods of North Hollywood, Panorama City, and Woodland Hills. These projects started with the first few in Woodland Hills and the NoHo West project in North Hollywood began groundbreaking and construction on April 6, 2017.

LA Metro is planning to upgrade the Metro G Line by 2024 with at-grade crossing gates and two bridges crossing both Sepulveda and Van Nuys boulevards, and a full-scale light rail conversion is planned to be completed by 2050. The valley will get its first light rail line in seven decades by 2027, the East San Fernando Valley Light Rail Transit Project. Construction of the line is planned to begin in 2024 along Van Nuys Boulevard and San Fernando Road.

== Economy ==
The Valley is home to numerous companies, the most well known of which work in motion pictures, music recording, and television production. The former movie ranches were branches of original studios now consisting of CBS Studio Center, NBCUniversal, The Walt Disney Company (and its ABC television network), and Warner Bros.

The Valley was previously known for advances in aerospace technology and nuclear research by companies such as Lockheed, Rocketdyne and its Santa Susana Field Laboratory, Atomics International, Litton Industries, Marquardt, and TRW's predecessor Thompson Ramo Wooldridge.

=== Pornography industry ===
The Valley became the pioneering region for producing adult films in the 1970s and grew to become home to a multibillion-dollar pornography industry, earning the monikers "Porn Valley", "Silicone Valley" (in contrast to "Silicon Valley", nickname for the Santa Clara Valley), and "San Pornando Valley". The leading trade paper for the industry, AVN magazine, is based in the Northwest Valley, as were a majority of U.S. adult video and magazine distributors. The Paul Thomas Anderson film Boogie Nights explores these aspects of the Valley. According to the HBO series Pornucopia, at one time, nearly 90 percent of all legally distributed pornographic films made in the United States were either filmed in or produced by studios based in the San Fernando Valley. The pornography industry began to decline by the mid-2000s, owing, for the most part, to the growing amount of free content on the Internet, which undercut consumers' willingness to pay. In 2007 industry insiders estimated that revenue for most adult production and distribution companies had declined 30 percent to 50 percent, and the number of new films made had fallen sharply. A 2019 article stated that "the porn industry in Budapest is as big as what remains of the industry in California".

== Arts and culture ==
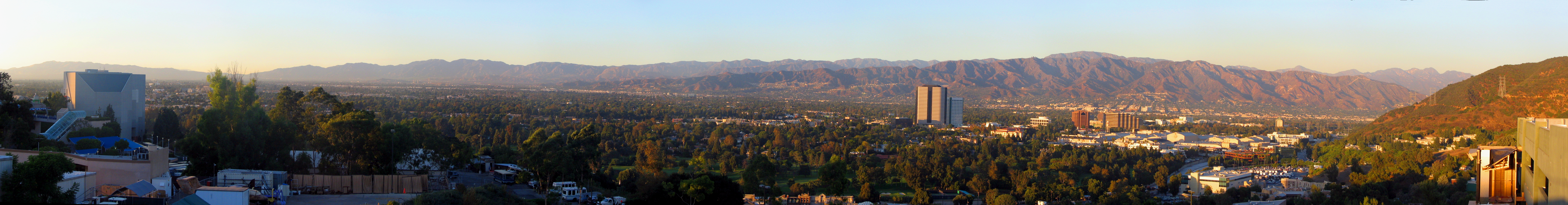
Panorama of San Fernando Valley from Universal Studios
- The Great Wall of Los Angeles – A 2,754-foot-long (839 m) mural designed by Judy Baca and painted on the sides of the Tujunga Wash, depicting the history of California.
- The Mission San Fernando Rey de España is a Spanish mission in the Mission Hills district of Los Angeles. The mission was founded on September 8, 1797, and was the seventeenth of the twenty-one Spanish missions established in Alta California. Named for Saint Ferdinand, the mission is the namesake of the city of San Fernando and the San Fernando Valley.
- The Main Street Canoga Park festival is held every year during the Day of the Dead celebrations. where people from all over can do things like show off their cars in the car shows, display ones art at the art displays, and dress up in Dia De Los Muertos attire and celebrate the lives of people who have passed. What was just a group of people in the community coming together has become a big festival where anyone can participate in the celebrations and activities.

=== Museums ===
- The Nethercutt Collection – Museum in Sylmar best known for its collection of classic automobiles, also has collections of mechanical musical instruments and antique furniture.
- Valley Relics Museum – Museum in Van Nuys dedicated to the history and pop culture of the San Fernando Valley. It was once located in Chatsworth, California.
- Gordon R. Howard Museum complex in Burbank, California.
- Autry Museum of the American West – near Burbank in Griffith Park.
- Los Angeles Live Steamers Railroad Museum - near Burbank in Griffith Park
- Travel Town Museum – near Burbank in Griffith Park.
- Walt Disney's Carolwood Barn - near Burbank in Griffith Park
- Discovery Cube Los Angeles - Children's museum in Hansen Dam.
- The Museum of the San Fernando Valley in Northridge.

=== Convention center ===
The San Fernando Valley has a convention center located in the city of Burbank, east of the Burbank Airport, at the Marriott Hotel.

=== Performing arts venues ===
- The Starlight Bowl – Amphitheater built in 1950, located in Burbank
- The Soraya and Younes Nazarian Center – Located on the CSUN campus, features a 1,700-seat concert hall

=== Amusement parks ===
Universal Studios Hollywood is in unincorporated Universal City. Busch Gardens, an amusement park in the Van Nuys neighborhood of Los Angeles, was located at the Budweiser brewery. It was torn down in the late 1970s.

== Parks and recreation ==
The San Fernando Valley is home to numerous neighborhood city parks, recreation areas and large Regional Open Space preserves. Many preserves are maintained as public parkland by the National Park Service's Santa Monica Mountains National Recreation Area, the California State Parks, and local county and municipal parks districts.

=== Small garden parks and missions ===
- The Japanese Garden
- The gardens at Adobes
- The Orcutt Ranch Horticulture Center
- The Leonis Adobe
- The Lopez Adobe
- The Andrés Pico adobe
- Los Encinos State Historic Park
- Mission San Fernando

=== Recreation areas ===
- Griffith Park, located at the southeastern end of the Valley
- Sepulveda Dam recreation area
- Hansen Dam recreation area
- Los Angeles River, with parks of various sizes along the part of the river located in the valley

=== Mountain open-space parks ===
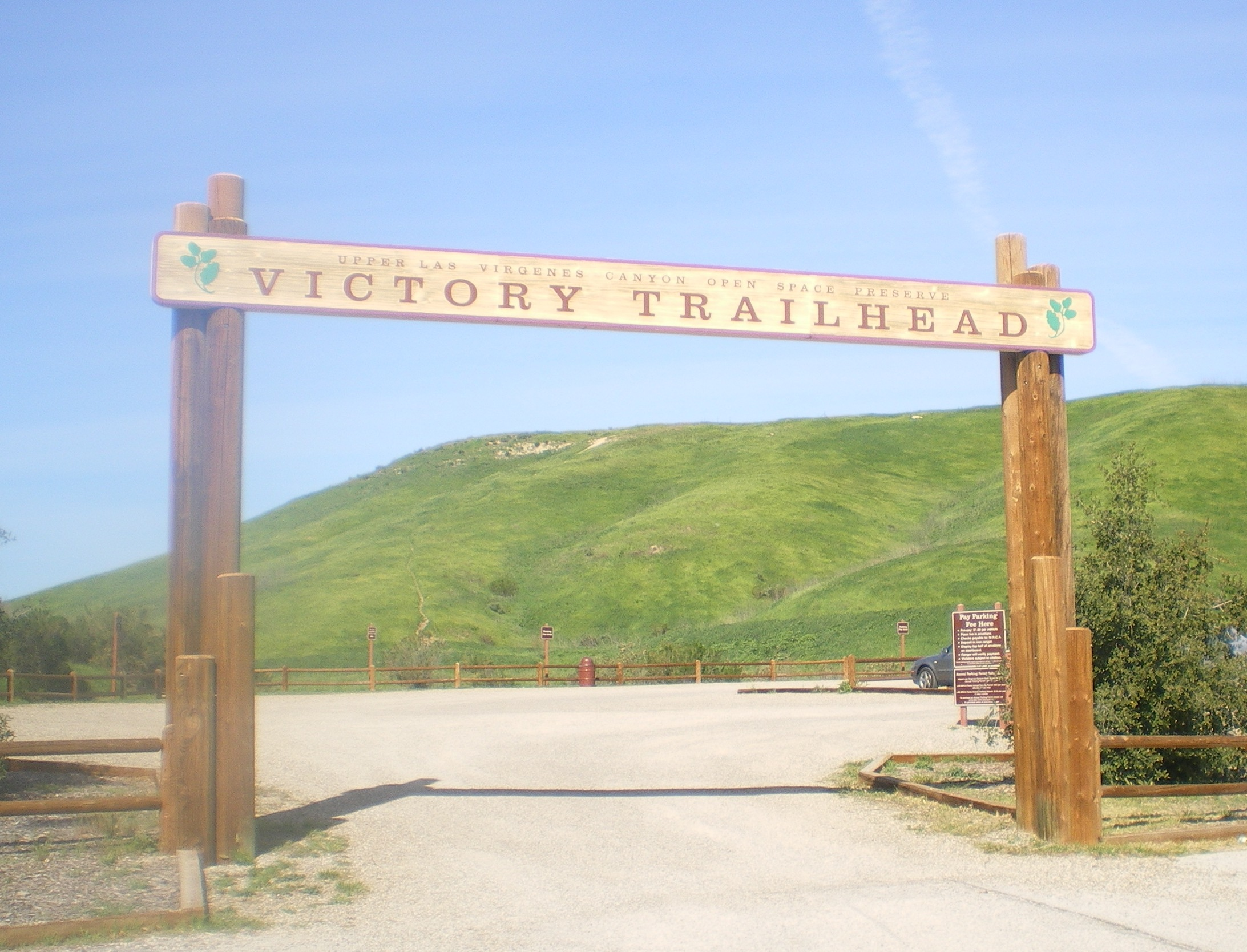
Victory Trailhead to the Upper Las Virgenes Canyon Open Space Preserve, West Hills

- Backbone Trail System
- Bell Canyon Park
- Brand Park
- Chatsworth Park South
- Deervale-Stone Canyon Park
- Deukmejian Wilderness Park
- El Escorpión Park
- Juan Bautista de Anza National Historic Trail
- La Tuna Park
- Laurel Canyon Park
- Marvin Braude Mulholland Gateway Park
- O'Melveny Park above Granada Hills
- Rocky Peak Park
- Sage Ranch Park (located in Simi Valley)
- San Vicente Mountain Park, above Encino
- Santa Susana Pass State Historic Park
- Topanga State Park
- Upper Las Virgenes Canyon Open Space Preserve
- Verdugo Mountains Open Space Preserve
- Wilacre Park
- Wildwood Canyon Park, above Burbank
- Wilson Canyon Park, above Sylmar

== Education ==
Public schools in the San Fernando Valley are served by three unified school districts; The Northwest and East Regions of the Los Angeles Unified School District, the Glendale Unified School District and the Burbank Unified School District. There are four community colleges in the valley; Los Angeles Valley College in Valley Glen, Los Angeles Mission College in Sylmar, and Los Angeles Pierce College in Woodland Hills. All except Glendale College are served by the Los Angeles Community College District. The only state university in the San Fernando Valley is California State University Northridge in Northridge.

In 1994, there were 180,000 PK-12 students attending Los Angeles Unified School District (LAUSD) campuses in the Valley. During the same year, about 45,000 PK-12 students, or one in five of all such students, attended the over 200 private schools in the Valley.

== Government ==
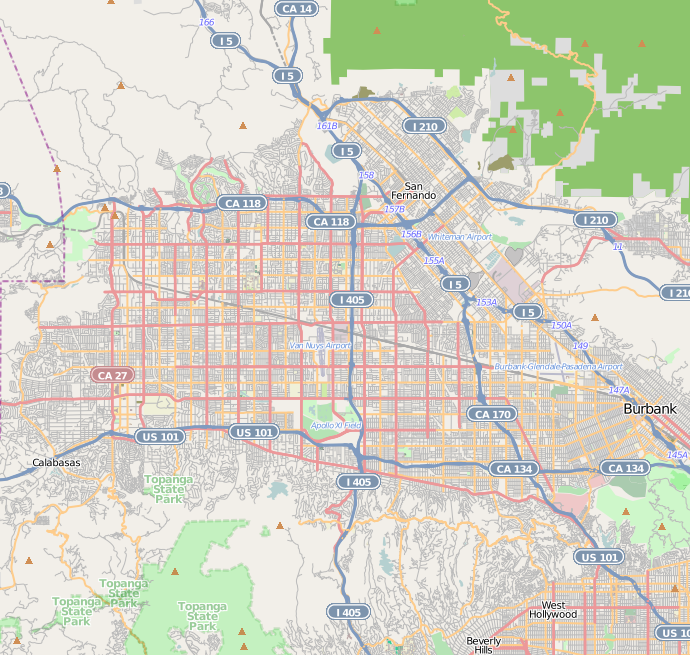
Map of the San Fernando Valley

=== Representation ===
The Los Angeles city section of the valley is divided into seven city council districts: 2, 3, 4, 5, 6, 7, and 12. Of the 95 Neighborhood councils in the city, 34 are in the valley. The valley is represented in the California State Legislature by five members of the State Assembly: Jesse Gabriel (D), Luz Rivas (D), James Ramos (D), Pilar Schiavo (D), and Laura Friedman (D). The valley is represented by three members of the State Senate: Henry Stern (D), and Anthony Portantino (D). The valley falls into five congressional districts: the 25th, 28th, 29th, 30th, and 33rd, represented respectively by Mike Garcia (R), Adam Schiff (D), Tony Cárdenas (D), Brad Sherman (D), and Ted Lieu (D). The valley is represented in the Los Angeles County Board of Supervisors, by two supervisorial districts, with the western portion represented by Sheila Kuehl (D) and the eastern portion by Kathryn Barger (R).

=== Incorporated cities (independent) ===
- Burbank
- Calabasas
- Glendale
- Hidden Hills
- Los Angeles
- San Fernando

=== Unincorporated communities ===
- Universal City
- West Chatsworth

=== City of Los Angeles neighborhoods of the San Fernando Valley ===
- Arleta
- Canoga Park
- Chatsworth
- Encino
- Granada Hills
- Lake Balboa
- Lake View Terrace
- Mission Hills
- NoHo Arts District
- North Hills
- North Hollywood
- Northridge
- Pacoima
- Panorama City
- Porter Ranch
- Reseda
- Shadow Hills^{+}
- Sherman Oaks
- Sherwood Forest
- Studio City
- Sun Valley
- Sunland-Tujunga^{+}
- Sylmar
- Tarzana
- Toluca Lake
- Toluca Terrace
- Toluca Woods
- Valley Glen
- Valley Village
- Van Nuys
- Warner Center
- West Hills
- Winnetka
- Woodland Hills

^{+} These communities are also included in the Crescenta Valley.

== Transportation ==
Victory Boulevard in Van Nuys, lined with low-rise commercial establishments, is typical of the broad, straight boulevards in the San Fernando Valley. Photo, 2002.

=== Freeways ===
Major freeways cross the Valley, including Interstate 405 (San Diego Freeway), U.S. Route 101 (Ventura Freeway/Hollywood Freeway), State Route 118 (Ronald Reagan Freeway), State Route 170 (Hollywood Freeway), State Route 134 (Ventura Freeway), Interstate 210 (Foothill Freeway), and Interstate 5 (Golden State Freeway). Notable streets include Sepulveda Boulevard, Ventura Boulevard, Laurel Canyon Boulevard, San Fernando Road, Victory Boulevard, Reseda Boulevard, Riverside Drive, Mulholland Drive, and State Route 27 (Topanga Canyon Boulevard).

=== Rapid transit ===
Subway, dedicated transitway, and express and local buses, provided by many agencies, serve the San Fernando Valley. Some of the former rights-of-way of the Pacific Electric Railway, which first accelerated population growth in the Valley, have been repurposed for busways and light rail lines.

The Los Angeles County Metropolitan Transportation Authority operates two Metro B Line subway stations in the Valley, which are located at Universal City and North Hollywood, which connect it directly to Hollywood and Downtown Los Angeles. The Metro B Line is the first heavy rail subway in the valley, extended from its prior terminus in 2000. With transfers, it connects the Valley to the entire Metro regional light rail and subway network. The B Line's two Valley subway stations provide access to national travel through Bob Hope Airport and Amtrak and regional travel through Metrolink, Metro Rapid, Metro Local, and the Metro G Line. Metro approved a new light rail line, the East San Fernando Valley Light Rail Transit Project that will run north–south on Van Nuys Boulevard from the G Line Van Nuys station to the Sylmar/San Fernando Metrolink station, however will be built in two phases. The first between Van Nuys and Pacoima, and the second from Pacoima to Sylmar/San Fernando station. Pre construction began in 2022, and is expected to be completed between 2028 and 2030.

The G Line busway uses a dedicated transitway route running the east–west length of the Valley connecting the North Hollywood B Line Station through the valley, then heads north through Canoga Park to the Chatsworth Metrolink station.

An additional Metro Busway line is planned for the Valley operating from North Hollywood station: the North Hollywood to Pasadena Bus Rapid Transit Project which will run to Pasadena with connections to the A Line. Metro is also studying a route through the Sepulveda Pass, the Sepulveda Transit Corridor, including heavy rail and monorail alternatives.

=== Rail ===
Metrolink commuter rail has two Valley lines, the Antelope Valley Line and Ventura County Line, which connect the Valley and beyond to downtown Los Angeles and south, becoming one line at the Downtown Burbank station. Metrolink always had one Burbank Airport station on the Ventura County Line, but a second Burbank Airport station was built in 2017 on the Antelope Valley Line.

Amtrak's Pacific Surfliner long-distance rail line has stops at Burbank Airport station, Van Nuys, and Chatsworth Station, before proceeding on to Ventura County, Santa Barbara, and Northern California or Union Station and San Diego.

The California High-Speed Rail Authority was planning two stations in the Valley, one in Burbank and the other in Sylmar, but the proposed Sylmar high-speed rail station was canceled owing to local opposition from the city of San Fernando. As of now, there's only one planned station in the valley, located in Burbank with an initial section of the railroad possibly opening in 2029.

=== Air ===
The Valley's two major airports are Hollywood Burbank Airport and the Van Nuys Airport. The Van Nuys–Airport FlyAway Terminal provides nonstop scheduled shuttle service to Los Angeles International Airport and back to the valley, with parking.

== Infrastructure ==
=== Utilities ===
Most of the utilities in the valley are served by public municipal governments, primarily the cities of Los Angeles, and Burbank, while there are only two private-owned utilities for gas and electricity in the valley as well. Southern California Edison has their overhead power lines going through the city of Burbank and through the Los Angeles city neighborhoods of Sylmar, Mission Hills, Arleta, North Hollywood, Studio City, Woodland Hills, Granada Hills, Porter Ranch, and Chatsworth as well. Internet, cable television, and cellular phone service in the valley are by large private companies.

The valley is served by the following utility companies:

Electricity

- Los Angeles Department of Water and Power (serves the entire Los Angeles city section of the valley, which is two thirds of the land area, and is also the largest electric utility in the San Fernando Valley)
- Burbank Water and Power
- Southern California Edison (serves the cities of San Fernando, Calabasas, and Hidden Hills)

Natural gas

- Southern California Gas Company

Water

- Los Angeles Department of Water and Power (serves the entire Los Angeles city section of the valley, which is two thirds of the land area)
- Burbank Water and Power
- City of San Fernando
- Metropolitan Water District

Internet and cable television

- AT&T
- Frontier Communications
- Charter Communications (Spectrum)

Sanitation

- City of Los Angeles
- City of San Fernando (Republic Services, Inc.)
- City of Burbank

== Healthcare ==
There are two Kaiser Permanente hospitals serving the San Fernando Valley, one in Panorama City and one in Woodland Hills. Also, there are three Providence hospitals, in Burbank, Providence Tarzana Medical Center in Tarzana, and Mission Hills. Besides Kaiser Permanente and Providence hospitals, most of the valley is served by non-profit hospitals such as: Valley Presbyterian Hospital in Van Nuys, Northridge Hospital Medical Center in Northridge, Olive View – UCLA Medical Center in Sylmar, Encino Hospital Medical Center in Encino, and Sherman Oaks Hospital in Sherman Oaks.

== Religious services ==
There are numerous Catholic churches in the San Fernando valley. The valley is home to the second-largest Jewish population in LA County. For the Muslims in Islam living in the San Fernando valley, there are seven mosques in the valley.

== Municipal services ==
The Los Angeles satellite administrative center for the valley, The Civic Center Van Nuys, is in Van Nuys. The area in and around the Van Nuys branch of Los Angeles City Hall is home to a police station, limited and unlimited jurisdiction superior courts and Los Angeles city and county administrative offices.

Branches of the Los Angeles Public Library and independent city's libraries service the residents.

== Emergency services ==
Los Angeles Police Department; Los Angeles Fire Department; Burbank Police Department; Burbank Fire Department; and the San Fernando Police Department are independent city emergency departments in the valley. Los Angeles County Sheriff's Department only serves unincorporated Universal City; the cities of Calabasas, Agoura Hills, & Hidden Hills; and also serves the three Los Angeles Community College District campuses in the San Fernando valley. The California State University system also has its own police force within the California State University, Northridge campus. Los Angeles County Fire Department only serves unincorporated areas, including Universal City; and the cities of Calabasas & Hidden Hills.

== Demographics ==
Mission San Fernando Rey de España gardens

As of 2023 the population of the San Fernando Valley was 1,815,801, of which 42 percent were Hispanic or Latino, 39 percent were non-Hispanic white, 11 percent were Asian, 4 percent were African Americans, 4 percent were two or more races and 1 percent other. With an area of 260 mi^{2}, it has a population density of about 6,900/mi^{2}, about 1/3 the density of the country of Singapore.

The largest city located entirely in the valley is Burbank, with over 107,000 residents. The most populous districts of Los Angeles in the Valley are Van Nuys and Pacoima, which like the city of Burbank have more than 100,000 residents each. Despite the San Fernando Valley's reputation for sprawling, low-density development, the valley communities of Panorama City, North Hollywood, Van Nuys, Reseda, Canoga Park, and Northridge, all in Los Angeles, have numerous apartment complexes and contain some of the densest census tracts in Los Angeles.

The San Fernando Valley has a significant population below the poverty level. About 30 percent of Valley households in 2009 earned less than $35,000 a year, including 10 percent who made less than $15,000 a year. The Pacoima district, once considered the hub of suburban blight and of having the highest poverty rate, is no longer such. Other San Fernando Valley neighborhoods such as North Hollywood, Panorama City, and Arleta now have poverty rates which are higher.

In general, the areas with lower poverty rates have become fewer and more scattered, while many of the now affluent communities have become compartmented, having their own private, planned and gated communities. Many of these tend to be on or near the borders of the Valley in the foothill regions.

According to Mapping L.A., Mexican and Salvadoran were the most common ancestries in San Fernando Valley in 2000. Mexico and El Salvador were the most common foreign places of birth.

== See also ==
Places

- CSUN Botanic Garden, southeastern section ("quadrant") of the California State University, Northridge campus
- Forest Lawn Memorial Park, one of the six Forest Lawn cemeteries, located in the Hollywood Hills
- The Los Angeles Zoo and Botanical Gardens
- Nestor Studios, valley ranch
- Providencia Ranch, Oak Crest
- Stoney Point, Chatsworth
- Equidome, Burbank

Information

- List of Los Angeles Historic-Cultural Monuments in the San Fernando Valley
- Los Angeles Times suburban sections
- Outline of the history of Los Angeles
- Southern California
