= Bell Canyon, California =

- Unincorporated community Census-designated place
- Location of Bell Canyon in Ventura County, California.

- Position in California.
- Coordinates: 34°12′29″N 118°41′15″W
- Country: United States
- State: California
- County: Ventura

Government
  - Type: Community Services District

Area
  - Total: 3.64 sq mi (9.43 km^{2})
  - Land: 3.64 sq mi (9.43 km^{2})
  - Water: 0 sq mi (0.00 km^{2}) 0%
- Elevation: 1,368 ft (417 m)

Population (2020)
  - Total: 1,946
  - Density: 534/sq mi (206/km^{2})
- Time zone: UTC-8 (Pacific (PST))
  - Summer (DST): UTC-7 (PDT)
- ZIP Code: 91307
- Area codes: 747 and 818
- GNIS feature ID: 2585403
- Website: https://www.bellcanyon.com/

Bell Canyon is an unincorporated community in eastern Ventura County, California, United States. Bell Canyon is a gated community in the Simi Hills with the main access through the Los Angeles community of West Hills and the western San Fernando Valley. Bell Canyon sits at an elevation of 1,368 feet (417 m). The 2020 census reported Bell Canyon's population was 1,946. For statistical purposes, the Census Bureau has defined Bell Canyon as a census-designated place (CDP). According to a 2016 study, Bell Canyon is the seventh wealthiest community in the state of California with an annual median income of $230,000.

== History ==
=== Pre-20th century ===
Chumash Native Americans lived in the canyon for around 8,000 years B.P. The Chumash had the village of Hu'wam here in the canyon on Bell Creek upstream from Escorpión Peak. It was multi-cultural, where Chumash, Tongva, and Tataviam peoples lived and traded together. Nearby is the Burro Flats Painted Cave. Escorpión Peak (aka: Castle Peak) is one of nine alignment points in Chumash territory and is considered essential to maintaining the balance of the natural world.

In 1845 the Mexican land grant for Rancho El Escorpión, named for the peak and located beside it at the mouth of Bell Canyon, was given by Mexican Governor Pío Pico. Chumash-Ventureño Chief Odón Eusebia (1795–), his brother-in-law Urbano, and Urbano's son Mañuel were the grantees of the Rancho grant, formerly Mission San Fernando Rey de España (Mission San Fernando) lands. After California U.S. statehood, as required by the Land Act of 1851, a claim for Rancho El Escorpión was filed with the United States Public Land Commission in 1852, and the grant was patented to Odón Eusebia, Urbano, and Mañuel in 1876. In 1871, Miguel Leonis acquired Odón Eusebia's holdings of Rancho El Escorpión, along with an adobe on the adjacent southern ranch lands in Calabasas. He used the land for cattle and sheep herds. Through various landowners that use continued at the Rancho until 1959 and Bell Canyon until 1967.

=== 20th century - onward ===
In 1967 the Spruce Land Corporation and Boise Cascade joined in a partnership to purchase the Bell Canyon area to develop the community of Bell Canyon. In the fall of 1968, the Bell Canyon Equestrian Center, designed by 'Southern California modern ranch style' architect Cliff May, was built and began operation. In 1969 a new subdivision called "Woodland Hills Country Estates" was developed and opened for sales. It was a success, selling nearly all the 800 home site lots within ten days. In the fall of 1969 the new residential property owners took leadership of the community association and renamed the development "Bell Canyon," after Charles A. Bell, the original homesteader here and son of pioneer Horace Bell. He was a leading late 1880s newspaper publisher, Los Angeles attorney winning many cases for clients against neighbor Miguel Leonis, and the 1906 Justice of the Peace for Calabasas. Legend says he lost a right arm in an 1887 shootout when raiding a moonshiner. The Rancho El Escorpión compound adobes, from the 1840s to the 1960s at the mouth of Bell Canyon, were actually outside the land grant and on Bell's property.

== Geography and environment ==
In the early 20th century there were at least two sulphured artesian springs in Bell Canyon.

Bell Creek, a tributary to the headwaters of the Los Angeles River, winds its way through the community. Bell Canyon is an important part of the crucial Simi Hills Wildlife corridor linking migrations between the Santa Monica Mountains and Santa Susana Mountains.

There are many hiking and riding trails around the community, some of which border the Upper Las Virgenes Canyon Open Space Preserve Park connecting to the south and west. The Bell Canyon Trail extends 4.5 miles (7.2 km) north from Bell Canyon Park.

== Demographics ==
Historical population
Census	Pop.	Note	%±
2010	2,049		—
2020	1,946		−5.0%
U.S. Decennial Census; 1850–1870 1880-1890; 1900 1910 1920; 1930 1940 1950; 1960 1970 1980; 1990 2000 2010

Bell Canyon first appeared as a census designated place in the 2010 U.S. census.

=== 2020 census ===
As of the 2020 census, Bell Canyon had a population of 1,946 and a population density of 534.6 inhabitants per square mile (206.4/km^{2}). The median age was 48.7 years. 19.7% of residents were under the age of 18, 9.9% were aged 18 to 24, 14.4% were aged 25 to 44, 32.3% were aged 45 to 64, and 23.7% were 65 years of age or older. For every 100 females, there were 98.2 males, and for every 100 females age 18 and over, there were 97.1 males age 18 and over.

The census reported that 100.0% of the population lived in households, 0.0% lived in non-institutionalized group quarters, and 0.0% were institutionalized. 100.0% of residents lived in urban areas, while 0.0% lived in rural areas.

There were 651 households, of which 31.2% included children under the age of 18. Of all households, 73.6% were married-couple households, 3.4% were cohabiting couple households, 9.8% had a male householder with no spouse or partner present, and 13.2% had a female householder with no spouse or partner present. About 8.9% of all households were made up of individuals and 4.9% had someone living alone who was 65 years of age or older. The average household size was 2.99, and there were 564 families (86.6% of all households).

There were 677 housing units at an average density of 186.0 units per square mile (71.8 units/km^{2}); 651 units (96.2%) were occupied and 3.8% were vacant. Of occupied units, 95.1% were owner-occupied and 4.9% were occupied by renters. The homeowner vacancy rate was 2.4% and the rental vacancy rate was 3.0%.

Racial composition as of the 2020 census
Race	Number	Percent
White	1,446	74.3%
Black or African American	41	2.1%
American Indian and Alaska Native	7	0.4%
Asian	199	10.2%
Native Hawaiian and Other Pacific Islander	0	0.0%
Some other race	44	2.3%
Two or more races	209	10.7%
Hispanic or Latino (of any race)	177	9.1%

== Government ==
The Bell Canyon Community Services District, an independent government agency provides services such as waste removal, community recreation programs and security services to the residents in its boundaries. The independent government agency was established in 1984.

== Education ==
Bell Canyon is served by the Las Virgenes Unified School District, with students bused each day to attend the schools of Round Meadow Elementary School, Alice C. Stelle Middle School, and Calabasas High School.

== Notable people ==
- John Aniston, actor (1933–2022)
- Roger Arnebergh, Los Angeles City Attorney (1910–2004)
- Guy Bee, television director, television producer, steadicam operator (1961–)
- Matt Earl Beesley, television director (1953–)
- Steve Bellamy, director and entertainment executive (1964–)
- Shelley Berman, comedian (1925–2017)
- Jonathan Butler, musician (1961–)
- Bruce Campbell, actor (1958–)
- José Canseco, baseball player (1964–)
- Scott Carpenter, astronaut (1925–2013)
- Katie Cassidy, musician/actress (1986–)
- Holly Marie Combs, actress (1973–)
- Micky Dolenz, musician (1945–)
- Roxann Dawson, actress (1958–)
- Stuart Duncan, CEO, founder, TEN Broadcasting Inc. (1956–)
- Bobbie Eakes, actress (1961–)
- Jeff Eastin, television producer, screenwriter (1967–)
- Elliot Easton, musician (1953–)
- Kevin Eubanks, jazz musician (1957–)
- Cory Everson, bodybuilder/actress (1959–)
- Jamie Farr, actor (1934–)
- Lyndsy Fonseca, actress (1987–)
- Ryan Friedlinghaus, MTV's Pimp My Ride, C.E.O. of West Coast Customs
- Snuff Garrett, record producer (1938–2015)
- Mike Garson, pianist (1945–)
- Kathy Garver, actress (1945–)
- Floyd Gaugh, musician (1967–)
- Bruce Hall, musician (1953–)
- Butch Hartman, animator (1965–)
- Don Herbert, "Mr. Wizard": scientist (1917–2007)
- Ernie Hudson, actor (1945–)
- Alex Katunich, musician (1976–)
- Paul Leonard-Morgan, composer (1974–)
- Pattie Mallette, Canadian author
- Sam McMurray, actor (1952–)
- John McVie, musician (1945–)
- Alyssa Milano, actress (1972–)
- Erin Murphy, actress (1964–)
- Niecy Nash, comedian/actress (1970–)
- Vince Neil, musician (1961–)
- Melissa Reeves, actress (1967–)
- Scott Reeves, actor/musician (1966–)
- Joe Rogan, actor, comedian, commentator, game show host (1967–)
- RZA, rapper, music producer (1969–)
- Kenny Wayne Shepherd, musician (1977–)
- Al Schmitt, recording engineer (1930–2021)
- T.T. Boy, actor (1968–)
- Trey Songz, R&B/hip hop artist (1984–)
- Marc Summers, game show host (1951–)
- Larry Wilcox, actor (1947–)

== See also ==
- Ranchos of California
- Upper Las Virgenes Canyon Open Space Preserve
