= Bell Creek (Southern California) =

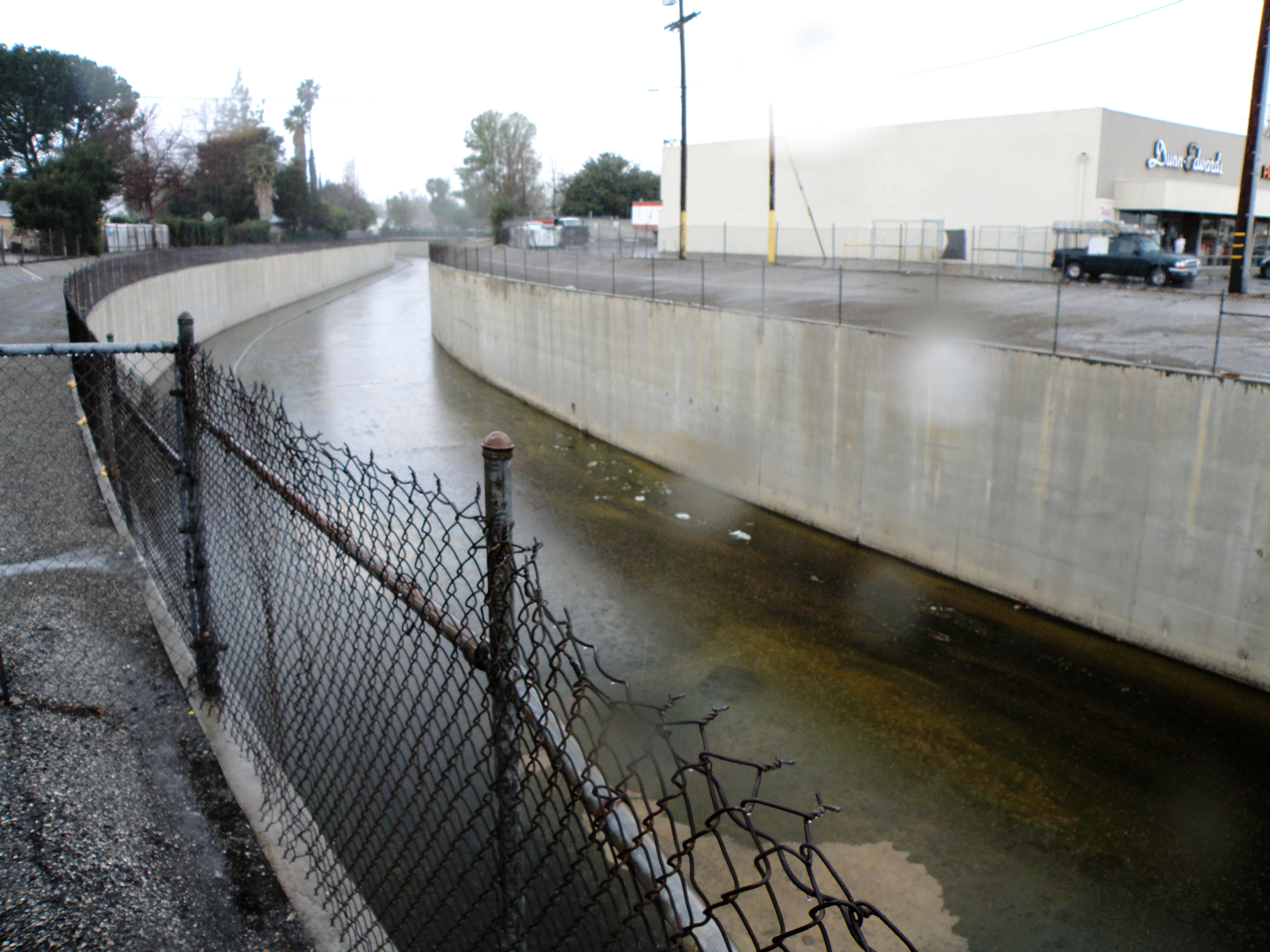
- Looking west from Topanga Canyon Blvd.

Location
- Country: United States

Physical characteristics
- Source
  - location: Simi Hills, California
- Mouth
  - location: Los Angeles River, California
  - coordinates: 34°11′43″N 118°36′07″W
- Basin size: Simi Hills, western San Fernando Valley

Bell Creek (also known as Escorpión Creek) is a 10-mile-long (16 km) tributary of the Los Angeles River, in the Simi Hills of Ventura County and the San Fernando Valley of Los Angeles County and City, in Southern California.

The confluence 34.1952°N 118.601838°W with Arroyo Calabasas marks the "headwaters" of the Los Angeles River. The initial headwater feeder-streams begin in the Simi Hills in Ventura County from 90% of the Rocketdyne Santa Susana Field Laboratory (SSFL) property as its watershed, leaving the site with toxic substances and radionuclide contamination via culvert outfalls, aquifer seeps and springs, and surface runoff. It then flows as a creek southeast through Bell Canyon (the community and geographic feature), Bell Canyon Park, and El Escorpión Park in a natural stream bed. It then is altered to flow in a concrete channel. Moore Creek joins in from the west, and then it flows east, channelized through West Hills, where it is joined by the South Fork and South Branches of the same name and by Dayton Creek. Then on through Canoga Park to join Arroyo Calabasas (Calabasas Creek) and becoming the Los Angeles River.

Bell Creek begins as a free-flowing stream until passing Escorpión Peak (Castle Peak) in Bell Canyon Park. At Bell Canyon Road and Elmsbury Lane it becomes encased in a concrete flood control channel. It then passes under Valley Circle Boulevard, flowing just south of Highlander Road through former Rancho El Escorpión-current West Hills, and further eastward parallel to (and south of) Sherman Way in Canoga Park. There, it joins Arroyo Calabasas, directly east of Canoga Park High School beside Vanowen Street.

== Crossings ==
From mouth to source (year built in parentheses):

=== Bell Creek ===
- Vassar Avenue/Canoga Park High School [Pedestrian Bridge]
- California State Route 27 - North Topanga Canyon Boulevard (1949)
- Glade Avenue [Pedestrian Bridge]
- Shoup Avenue (1962)
- Dayton Creek enters from north
- Fallbrook Avenue (1963)
- South Branch enters
- Royer Avenue [Pedestrian Bridge]
- South Fork enters
- Platt Avenue (1961)
- Moore Creek enters from west
- Valley Circle Boulevard (1963)
- Highlander Road (19__)
- Bell Canyon Road (1969)
- Buckskin Court (1969)

=== South Branch Bell Creek ===
- Vanowen Street (1949)

=== South Fork Bell Creek ===
- Vanowen Street (1958)
- Haynes Street [Pedestrian Bridge, Closed]
- Victory Boulevard (1959)
- Platt Avenue (1959)
- Peterson Avenue (1961)

== See also ==
- Source (river or stream) - a.k.a. watershed and headwaters
- Confluence - a.k.a. "headwaters"
- Drainage basin - a.k.a. "watershed"
- Urban runoff
