= Santa Monica Mountains Conservancy =

Government agency in California, United States

Agency overview
- Formed: 1980
- Agency executive: Irma R. Muñoz, Chair
- Parent agency: California Natural Resources Agency
- Website: smmc.ca.gov

The Santa Monica Mountains Conservancy is an agency of the state of California in the United States founded in 1980 and dedicated to the acquisition of land for preservation as open space, for wildlife and California native plants habitat nature preserves, and for public recreation activities.

The Santa Monica Mountains Conservancy was established by the California State Legislature in 1980. Since that time, it has helped to preserve over 72,000 acres of parkland in both wilderness and urban settings, and improved more than 114 public recreational facilities throughout Southern California. Additionally, it has given grants to nonprofit organizations for educational and interpretation programs that have served hundreds of thousands of children and other park visitors.

== Territory protected ==
The Santa Monica Mountains Conservancy territory originally was within the Santa Susana Mountains and Santa Monica Mountains, and the Simi Hills; areas located north and west of metropolitan Los Angeles in Ventura County and Los Angeles County. Since then its territory has been extended to the east to include parks in the San Gabriel Mountains, Verdugo Mountains, San Rafael Hills, and Puente Hills.

The 450,000-acre (180,000 ha) "zone" in which the conservancy can acquire land is bounded on the south by the Pacific Coast Highway from Santa Monica to Point Mugu. The zone extends inland roughly 50 miles (80 km) from Malibu north to Newhall Pass and 65 miles (105 km) from Thousand Oaks east to Pasadena. Several major freeways in Los Angeles cross the zone, including the Hollywood, Ventura, San Diego and Interstate 5.

== Preservation process ==
Since its founding, the Conservancy has acquired over 155,000 acres (63,000 ha) and identified another 15,000 acres (6,100 ha) within its zone as crucial for preservation. In addition to buying land outright, the Conservancy operates through public-private partnerships to promote low-density use among private land-owners. The conservancy also acquires rights to land through "time-leasing", receives land through donations and acquisition of foreclosures, and as mitigation for development projects.

The Conservancy zone includes the 155,000-acre (63,000 ha) Santa Monica Mountains National Recreation Area, created by the United States Congress in 1978, as well as 40,000 acres (16,000 ha) of state parks, including Topanga State Park, and parks within Los Angeles' city limits including the Marvin Braude Mulholland Gateway Park above Tarzana.

== Some examples ==
=== Additions ===
The Conservancy was responsible for the 1990s acquisition of the Jordan Ranch lands in the western Simi Hills near Thousand Oaks from entertainer Bob Hope, creating the Cheeseboro and Palo Commado Canyons Park section of the Santa Monica Mountains National Recreation Area (SMMNRA). The ranch was purchased by a developer and turned over the National Park Service as part of a land development deal, which then allowed their development of new housing and golf courses on the Ahmanson Ranch land adjacent to the east.

Late in 2003, the Conservancy secured state funds to purchase Ahmanson Ranch as well, creating the Upper Las Virgenes Canyon Open Space Preserve, a huge green belt on the western edge of West Hills and Woodland Hills.

The Santa Monica Mountains Conservancy also acquired the Peter Strauss Ranch from the entertainer Peter Strauss in the central Santa Monica Mountains, which was also turned over to the National Park Service and opened to the public in the SMMNRA.

The Conservancy is one of the four agencies sharing operation of the Santa Monica Mountains Anthony C. Beilenson Interagency Visitor Center, located at the former King Gillette Ranch stables. It is located at 26876 Mulholland Highway, at the junction with Las Virgenes/Malibu Canyon Road near Calabasas. The stables and Gillette mansion were originally designed by Wallace Neff in the 1920s. The completed redesign project is the first visitor center in a zero-energy building in the National Park Service, and is LEED certified. It is named for Anthony C. Beilenson, the former congressman who authored legislation in 1978 to establish the SMMNRA. The center is operated by the four partner agencies in the park: the National Park Service, California State Parks, Santa Monica Mountains Conservancy, and Mountains Recreation and Conservation Authority (MRCA).

=== Subtractions ===
As reported in the Los Angeles Times, controversy ensued when the Santa Monica Mountains Conservancy voted in April 2014 to drop its opposition to the large Dave Evans subdivision development proposal for Malibu, in exchange for $1 million in donations and consulting work. The singer Dave Evans, a.k.a. "The Edge", with the Irish rock band U2, has proposed a compound of five mansions on a coast−facing Santa Monica Mountains ridge, above Serra Canyon on Sweetwater Mesa Road. Malibu residents and environmentalists have opposed the project as excessive development and viewshed destruction, and have called into question the ethics of the Santa Monica Mountains Conservancy regarding the proposal. The California Coastal Commission postponed its October 2014 vote on the project until 2015. Joe Edmiston, the conservancy's executive director, said his group had been wrong to agree to those terms to drop its opposition. The California Supreme Court rejected the scheme in 2018.

== See also ==
- Santa Monica Mountains National Recreation Area
- List of flora of the Santa Monica Mountains
- Natural history of the Santa Monica Mountains
- Ecology of California
- San Gabriel and Lower Los Angeles Rivers and Mountains Conservancy
