= Simi Hills =

Mountain range of the Transverse Ranges in California, United States

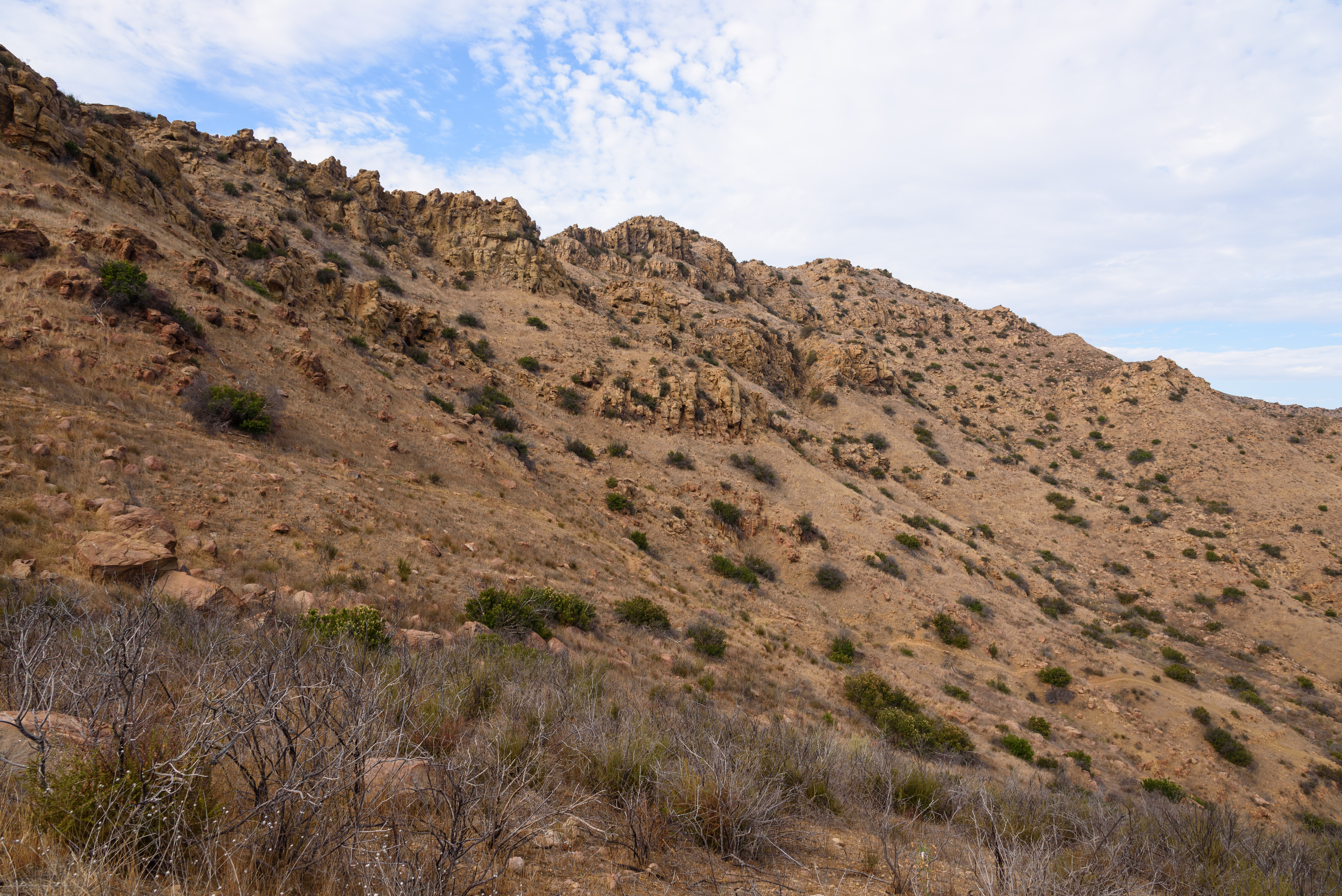
- Main ridge of Simi Peak, highest summit of the Simi Hills

Highest point
- Peak: Simi Peak
- Elevation: 2,139 ft (652 m)

Geography
- Location within California
- Country: United States
- State: California
- Districts: Ventura County; Los Angeles
- Range coordinates: 34°13′28.015″N 118°43′0.326″W
- Topo map: USGS Calabasas

The Simi Hills are a low rocky mountain range of the Transverse Ranges in eastern Ventura County and western Los Angeles County, of Southern California, United States.

The range runs mainly north-south, is approximately 26 miles (42 km) long by 7 mi (11 km) wide, and reaches a maximum elevation of 2,401 ft (732 m) at Simi Peak.

== Geography ==
The Simi Hills are aligned east-west and run for 26 miles (42 km), and average around 7 mi (11 km) north-south. The Simi Hills are part of the central Transverse Ranges System. They lie almost entirely within southeastern Ventura County, with some southern and eastern foothills within western Los Angeles County.

The Simi Hills are on the western edge of the San Fernando Valley. The Simi Valley lies to the north, and the Conejo Valley lies to the southwest. The San Fernando Valley communities of Chatsworth, West Hills, and Woodland Hills are in the eastern hills and adjacent valley floor in Los Angeles city and county. The cities of Agoura Hills and Westlake Village are also located in Los Angeles County, generally southwest of the Simi Hills. The cities of Thousand Oaks (to the west) and Simi Valley city (to the north) are in the hills and adjacent valleys within Ventura County.

The two nearby mountain ranges are: the higher Santa Susana Mountains adjacent on the northeast across Santa Susana Pass; and the Santa Monica Mountains running nearby along the south.

=== Watersheds ===
The hills provide the complete or partial watersheds for several year-round creeks and numerous seasonal streams. They include Las Virgenes Creek (tributary of Malibu Creek), Moore's Canyon Creek, Bell Creek, Dayton Creek, Woolsey Canyon Creek, Brandeis Creek, Runkle Canyon Creek, Arroyo Simi, Palo Comado Creek, Cheeseboro Creek, and Arroyo Calabasas (northern fork). Bell Creek and Arroyo Calabasas are the headwaters of the Los Angeles River, by name its beginning with their confluence in nearby Canoga Park. 90% of the Santa Susana Field Lab property drains into the Los Angeles River via tributaries.

=== Peaks ===
Peaks in this region include Simi Peak, 2,403 ft (732 m), Chatsworth Peak, 2,314 ft (700 m), and Escorpión Peak (aka: Castle Peak), 1,475 ft (450 m).

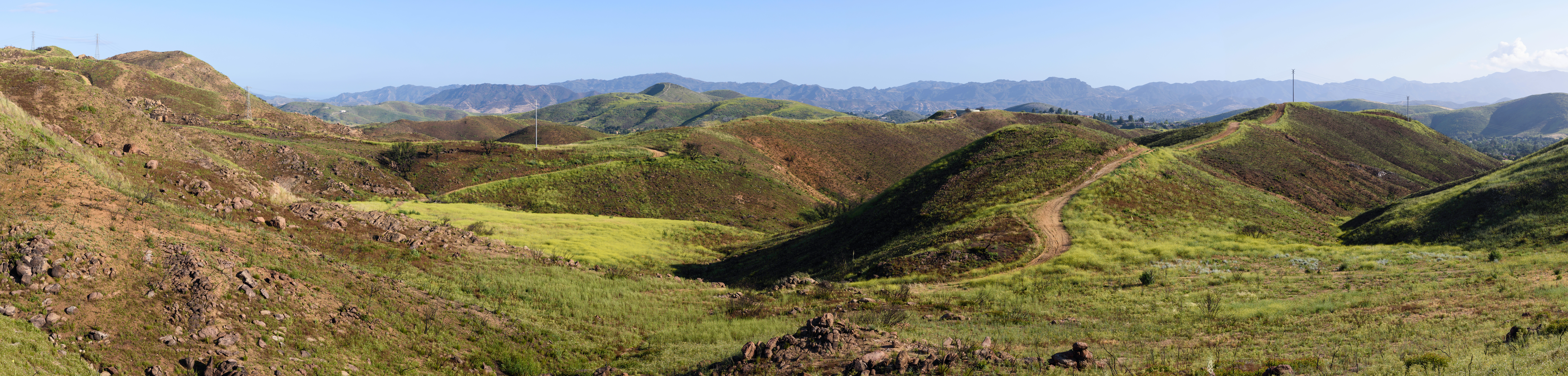
View of Simi Hills looking south from Oakbrook Regional Park, with the Santa Monica Mountains in the distance.

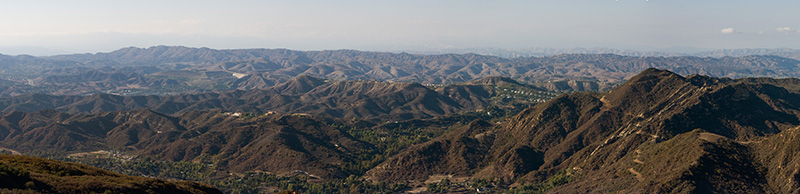
Panoramic view of the Simi Hills looking north from the Santa Monica Mountains.

=== Climate ===
Because of its low elevation, the Simi Hills typically experience rainy, mild winters. Snow is rare in the Simi Hills, even in the highest areas. Summers are warm and dry and wildfires do occur here. Cool winds from the Pacific Ocean come from the Oxnard Plain and blow into the inland areas through the Santa Clara River Valley and the Conejo Valley, though some low hills, such as Conejo Mountain, block these winds from the Conejo Valley. The Simi Hills further block these winds, which bring cool weather in both summer and winter from the San Fernando Valley.

== Flora and fauna ==
=== Flora ===
The southern lower hills are mostly covered in grasslands and oak savanna. The northern rocky hills area is primarily chaparral shrubland and oak woodlands. The Simi Hills are part of the California chaparral and woodlands ecoregion. The oaks (Quercus spp.) include: the evergreen coastal live oak (Quercus agrifolia), the deciduous valley oak (Quercus lobata), and the scrub oak (Quercus dumosa). Riparian zone plants include California sycamores (Platanus racemosa) and arroyo willows (Salix lasiolepis). Spring wildflowers include the redbush monkey flower (Mimulus aurantiacus), Plummer's mariposa lily (Calochortus plummerae), and canyon sunflower (Encelia californica). poison oak (Toxicodendron diversilobum) is also an important member of the native plant habitat community here.

=== Fauna ===
The Simi Hills is the principal, and much wider, of only two terrestrial wildlife corridors linking the coastal Santa Monica Mountains with the inland Santa Susana Mountains, Topatopa Mountains, and San Gabriel Mountains, all of the transverse ranges fauna community. The Simi Hills are a critical wildlife corridor linkage for the Santa Monica Mountains to these and other Transverse Ranges further east. The undeveloped native habitat provides routes that protect larger land wildlife of the Santa Monicas from genetic isolation. The Wallis Annenberg Wildlife Crossing is a vegetated overpass spanning the Ventura Freeway under construction at Liberty Canyon in Agoura Hills.

Large sections of the Simi Hills are protected by parks and open space preserves. The Santa Susana Field Laboratory property, a crucial wildlife corridor to the Santa Susanas, has been proposed for public open space parkland after the closed site's cleanup completion.

The population of red-legged frogs is small and isolated, and was impacted by the Woolsey Fire that swept through the area in November 2018, as were thirteen mountain lions, two of whom (P-64 and P-74) died.

== History ==
The Simi Hills were inhabited for over 8,000 years by Paleo-indians and Chumash-Venturaño Native Americans for settlements and hunting grounds. The Chumash had the established village of Hu'wam in Cañon del Escorpión (Bell Canyon). It was a multicultural 'crossroads' destination, where Chumash, Tongva, and Tataviam peoples traded and lived beside Bell Creek below Escorpión Peak, at the present day Bell Canyon Park. This peak in the Simi Hills (aka: Castle Peak) is one of nine alignment points in Chumash territory and is essential to maintaining the balance of the natural world. Upstream were healing springs and are rock outcrop 'grinding stones.' The Burro Flats Painted Cave, an example of the Rock art of the Chumash people, is nearby.

The Juan Bautista de Anza expedition passed through the area in 1769, being the first European sighting of the Simi Hills. The U.S. National Park Service administers the Juan Bautista de Anza National Historic Trail which enters at Moore Canyon in El Escorpión Park and crosses across the southern Hills through Upper Las Virgenes Canyon Open Space Preserve and Cheeseboro/Palo Comado Canyon Park to the Conejo Valley. In 1845 the land grant for Rancho El Escorpión, beside the Peak and named for it, was issued to one Chumash and two Tongva people and a rare instance of Native Americans being grantees, by Mexican Governor Pío Pico. The Rancho El Conejo was to the west, and included that end of the Simi Hills.

In the first half of the 20th century, there were four large movie ranches in the Simi Hills for filming motion pictures on location. The gated community of Bell Canyon began development of geographic Bell Canyon in the 1968. To the north of U.S. 101, east of Thousand Oaks, and west of Simi Valley the early 1960s suburban expansion of metropolitan Los Angeles brought the development of small to significantly sized parcels of land in the Simi Hills. Hillside subdivisions regraded natural contours into terraced lots, changing the Hills viewshed, drainage patterns, and habitats in those areas. The extensive planned new community projects at Jordan Ranch and Ahmanson Ranch were eventually stopped by local citizens and the Santa Monica Mountains Conservancy keeping extensive Hills acreage natural in open space parks.

The Simi Hills were home of the Rocketdyne Santa Susana Field Laboratory (SSFL) for open-air testing of rocket engines from 1947 to 1990, and the site of experimental nuclear reactor experiments with four nuclear accidents between 1959 and 1969; these projects and accidents were declassified in 1989. The first accident, in 1959, was the most serious with a full meltdown. The extent of the accident is unknown due to instrument limitations, other than that it released extensive radiation. More radiation was released in the 1959 event than in the Three Mile Island accident 20 years later. The groundwater under portions of the Simi Hills, contaminated with toxins and radionuclides that were also historically used at SSFL, has been and is a key concern in new development decisions and the SSFL property's future limited to parkland use after an impending cleanup, initiating preservation of more open space in the range.

The Rim of the Valley Trail Corridor is in the planning stages and includes the Simi Hills open space parklands and proposed new areas.

== Parks ==
- Bell Canyon Park with Bell Creek; West Hills and Bell Canyon
- Challenger Park
- Cheeseboro/Palo Comado Canyon Park - in the Santa Monica Mountains National Recreation Area, western Simi Hills in Ventura County.
- El Escorpión Park and the Moore's Canyon Juan Bautista de Anza National Historic Trail segment; West Hills, Los Angeles
- Rocky Peak Park - adjacent and above Santa Susana Pass
- Ronald Reagan Presidential Library complex with museum
- Sage Ranch Park - near the Santa Susana Field Laboratory with trails and camping.
- Santa Susana Pass State Historic Park - with the Old Santa Susana Stage Road in the rocky northern Simi Hills.
- Upper Las Virgenes Canyon Open Space Preserve - (previously the Ahmanson Ranch Park), 3,000 acres (12 km²) Park in the southern Simi Hills, managed by the Santa Monica Mountains Conservancy.

== Nearby ranges ==
- Chalk Hills
- Santa Susana Mountains
- Santa Monica Mountains
- Verdugo Mountains

== See also ==
- Burro Flats Painted Cave
- Bell Creek
- Rancho El Escorpión
