= Upper Las Virgenes Canyon Open Space Preserve =

Nature reserve in California, United States

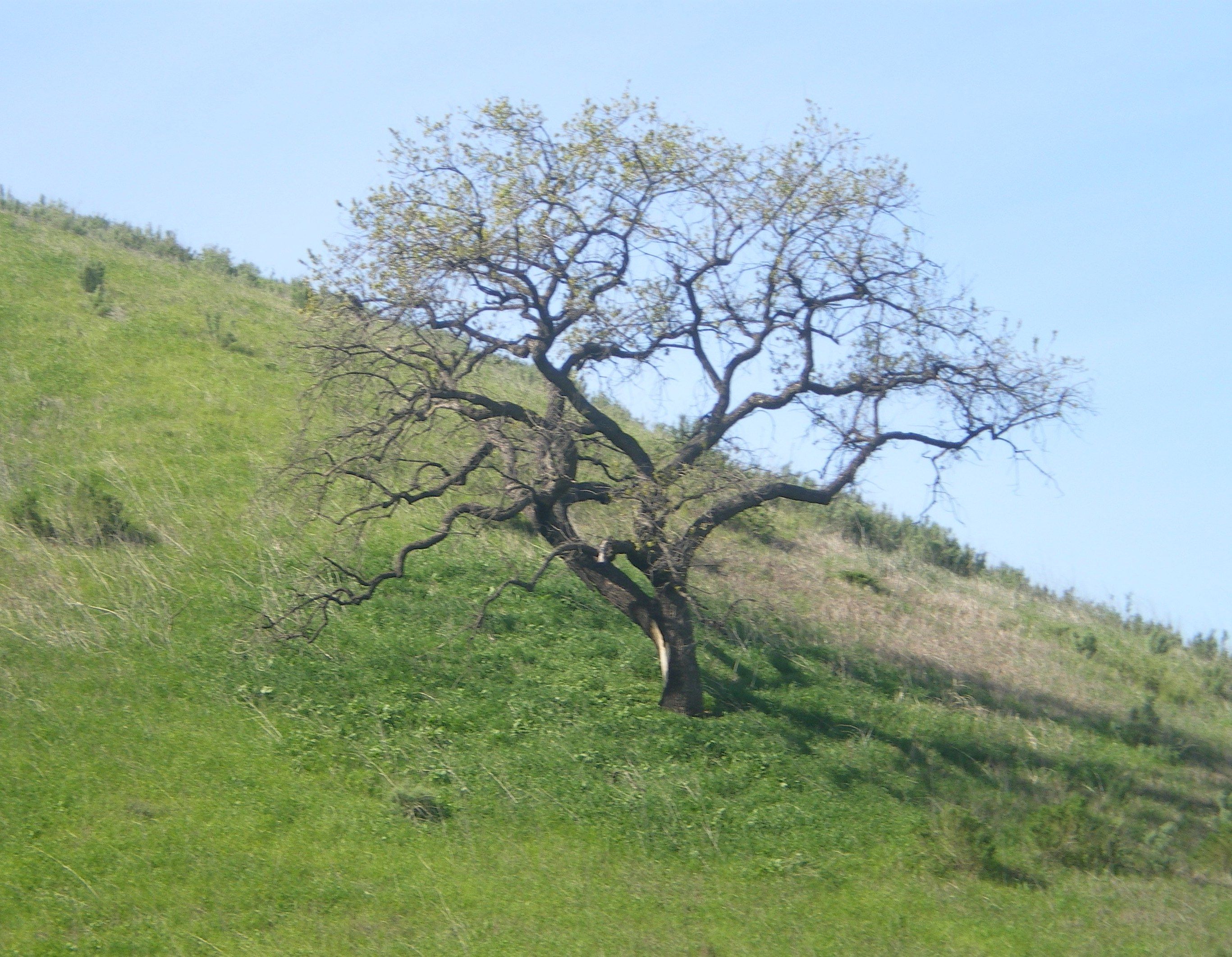
- Oak Tree at Upper Las Virgenes Canyon Preserve

- Location within California Location within the United States
- Coordinates: 34°11′03″N 118°42′06″W
- Area: 2,983 acres (12.07 km^{2})
- Established: 2003
- Governing body: Santa Monica Mountains Conservancy

The Upper Las Virgenes Canyon Open Space Preserve is a large open space nature preserve owned and operated by the Santa Monica Mountains Conservancy spanning nearly 3,000 acres (1,200 ha) in the Simi Hills of western Los Angeles County and eastern Ventura County.

Originally part of Ahmanson Ranch, this area was sold by Seattle-based Washington Mutual savings bank holding company to the Santa Monica Mountains Conservancy in late 2003 after lengthy issues concerning development in the chaparral shrub forest and oak savanna understory and overstory plant communities. It was previously called Ahmanson Ranch Park.

== History ==
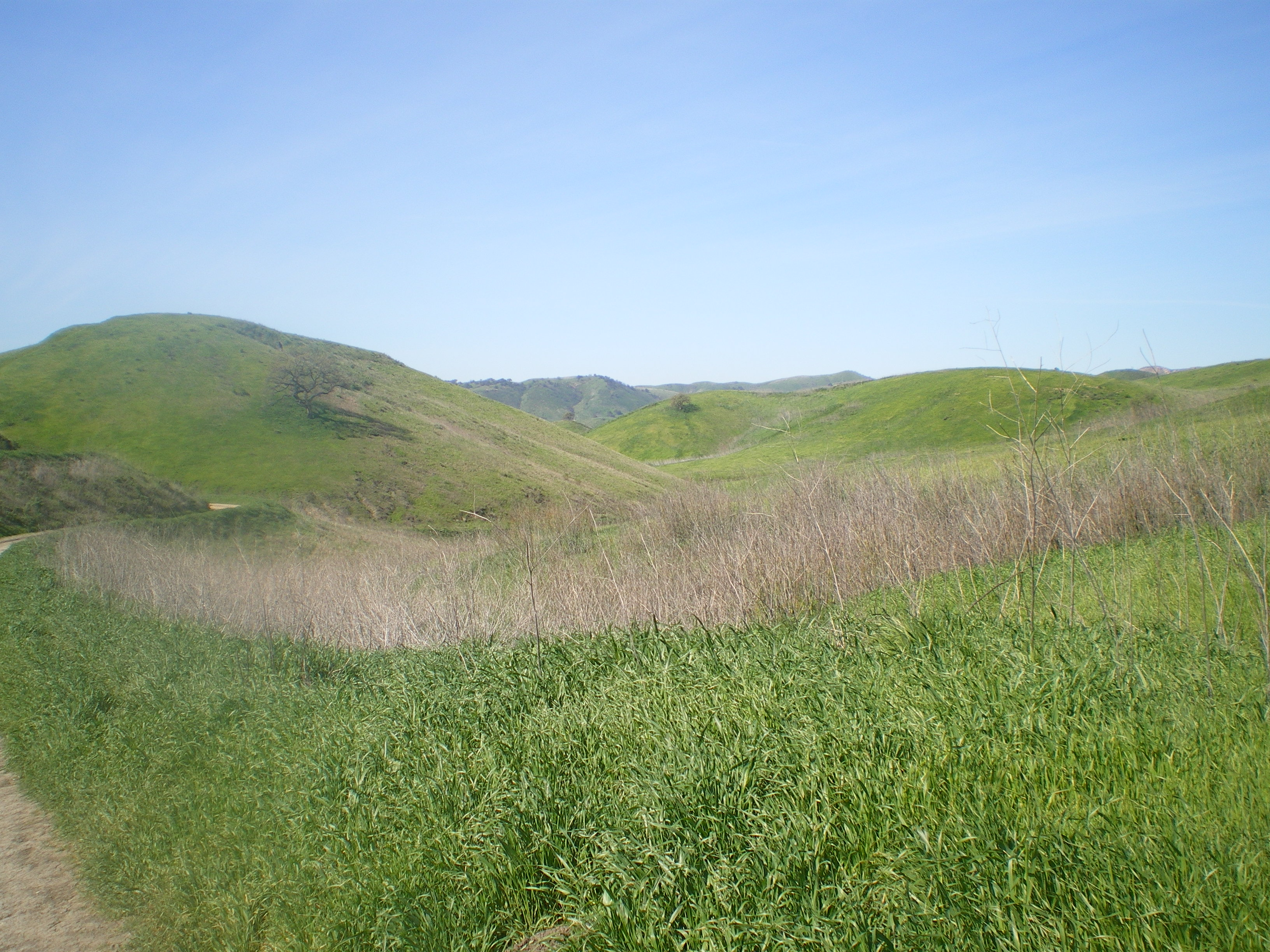
Rolling hills at Upper Las Virgenes Canyon Preserve

=== Pre-1963 ===
For thousands of years the Chumash Native American tribe lived in the current Preserve's area. The Chumash had, prior to European involvement, at least one village on the land, Huwam, a multi-cultural village where Chumash, Tongva, and Tataviam peoples lived. On Bell Creek beside Escorpión Peak (Castle Peak) a large rocky mountain on the property of El Escorpion Park, is the reported site of this village. The peak is one of nine alignment points in Chumash territory and is essential to maintaining the balance of the natural world. A cave known as The Cave of Munits exists just inside the property. This is the believed cave of a mythical Chumash shaman who was killed after murdering the son of a Chumash chief. This cave also appeared in the films The Canyon of Missing Men (1930) and Tarzan and the Golden Lion (1927).

The 1769 Juan Bautista de Anza expedition, the first European exploration by land of Las Californias, passed by the area. The U.S. National Park service's Juan Bautista de Anza National Historic Trail goes through the Preserve, entering from the east in Moore Canyon from El Escorpion Park and Vanowen Street and leaving in the west into the Santa Monica Mountains National Recreation Area's Cheeseboro & Palo Comado Canyons section. The Rancho El Escorpión was an 1845 Mexican land grant named after the Peak, and was adjacent on the northeast side of the Preserve. From the 1920s to the 1950s many Westerns and other types of motion pictures were filmed here at the Lasky Mesa movie ranch area.

=== 1963-2003 ===
In 1963, Home Savings of America obtained the property that was then called Ahmanson Ranch. It sat unused, with no plans for development, until 1989 when Home Savings of America announced their plans for the 5,400 acres (22 km^{2}) property. The plans included over 3,000 homes, two golf courses, and 400,000 square feet (40,000 m^{2}) of commercial and residential space. However, in 1998, Home Savings of America was bought by Washington Mutual for $6.4 billion. In 2003 the Santa Monica Mountains Conservancy purchased the land from WAMU for an open space preserve and nature reserve Park.

=== 2003-Present ===
On September 28, 2005, the Topanga Canyon Fire broke out between the west-bound State Route 118 and Topanga Canyon Boulevard. By September 29, the fire had reached the Preserve, and burned a large portion of the park near, and including, El Escorpion Park. By October 3, 2005, the fire had been contained. A total of 24,175 acres (100 km^{2}) were burned, and it cost over $8 million to contain and extinguish the fire. The effects of the fire were visible in the park, as much of the chaparral and grasslands were burned away, and Oak tree canopies burned off. Since the California native plants have evolved with wildfires, from their basal roots, seeds, and branches they re-sprouted the following fall and winter exhibiting new growth by the next spring.

It sustained severe damage during the Woolsey Fire of 2018.

== Access ==
=== Trailheads ===
There are two preserve trailheads at which people can access the park.

==== Victory Trailhead ====
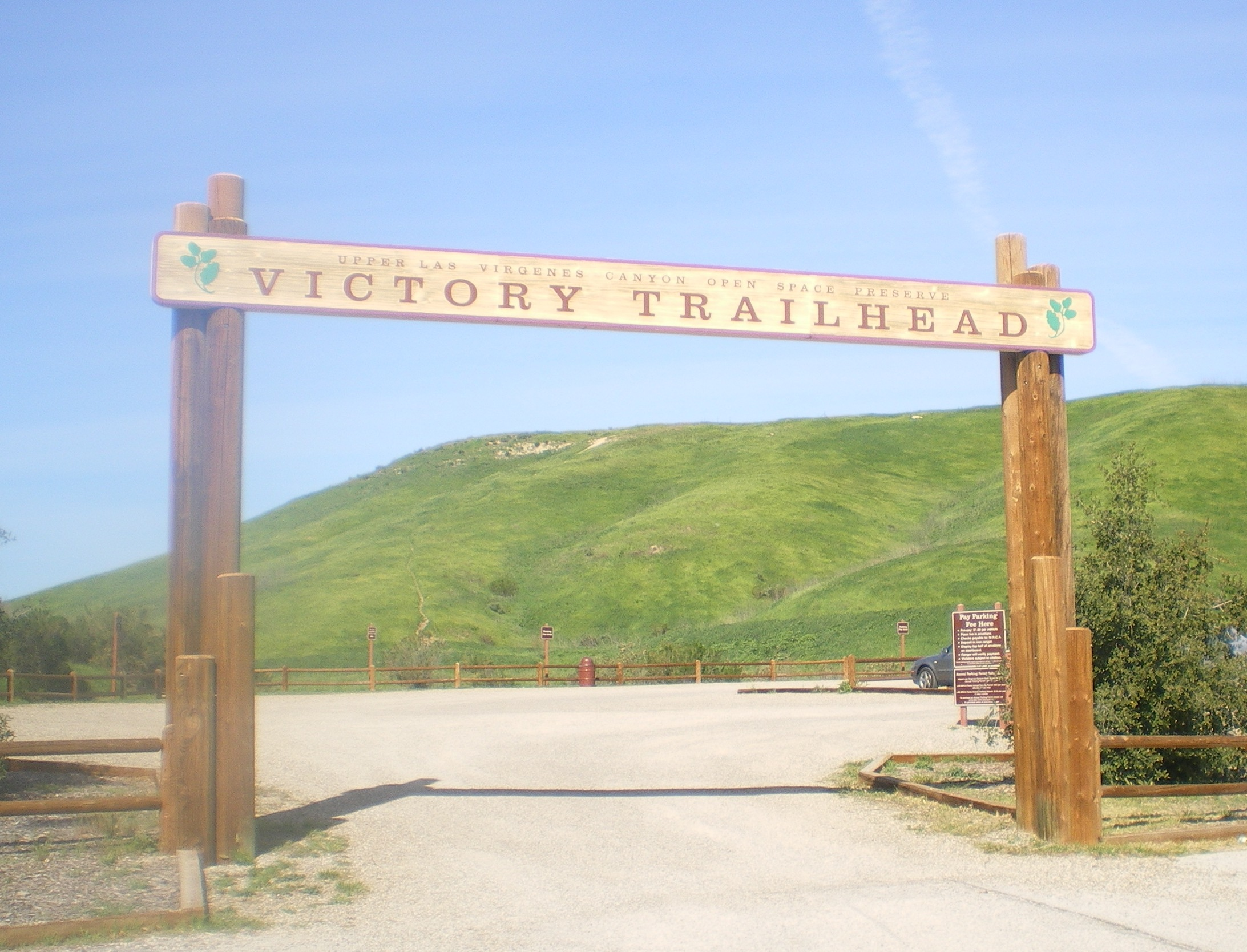
Victory Trailhead in March 2008

Located at the western end of Victory Blvd. in West Hills, the Victory Trailhead is the main trailhead for the Preserve. It features a large gravel parking lot with a Portable Toilet that is cleaned at least weekly. The parking lot has room for buses and equestrian trailers. Parking is $3 for the day. Parking passes are available through The Santa Monica Mountains Conservancy website. Multi-park 5- and 7-day and single park 7-day passes are available. Parking is also available outside the park gates on Victory Blvd., Gilmore St., and Country Oak Rd. A bulletin board featuring information on the Santa Monica Mountains Conservancy and recent park and system information is located in the parking lot. There are two picnic tables just inside the park and a large informational display featuring the history, geography, and wildlife of the Preserve.

==== Las Virgenes Canyon Road Trailhead ====
This trailhead is located west of Calabasas and north of the Ventura Freeway (U.S. Route 101) on Las Virgenes Canyon Road, at the end of the road. Parking is provided, with a large informational display featuring the history, geography, and wildlife of the Preserve.

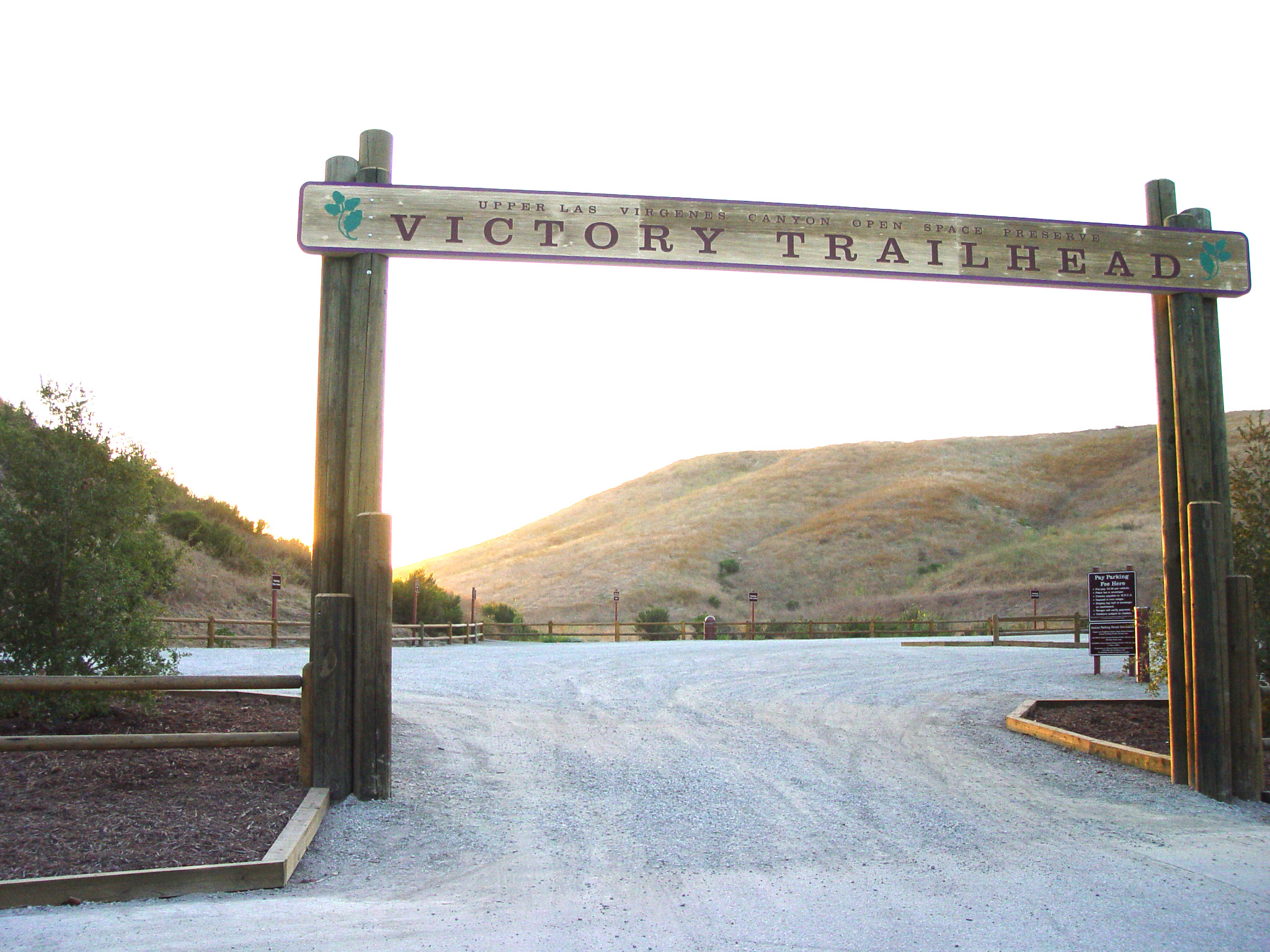
Victory Trailhead in August 2005

== Trails ==
There are several primary trails through which people can access the park.

1. The Victory Trailhead has a junction with two main trails. The first goes due west through the Preserve directly to Upper Las Virgenes Canyon and the trails of Cheeseboro/Palo Comado Canyon Park in the Santa Monica Mountains National Recreation Area. The second goes south through the Preserve to the Laskey Mesa area, and then on to Upper Las Virgenes Canyon.
2. The Las Virgenes Road Trailhead's main trail heads into Upper Las Virgenes Canyon, with junctions for trails to Laskey Mesa and to Cheeseboro/Palo Comado Canyon Park, or continuing on north to the Bell Canyon area.
3. The El Escorpión Trail, runs from L.A. City's El Escorpión Park at the west end of Vanowen Street near Valley Circle Boulevard in West Hills through the preserve to the Victory Trailhead. The trail runs through Moore's Canyon past the Cave of Munits, has a gentle slope, and can be taken in either direction. L.A. City's Bell Canyon Park is directly adjacent to the north of these two parks, with one trail along Bell Creek and others connecting southward.

These trails are available for walking, hiking, mountain biking, and equestrian use during the hours of daylight (sunrise to sunset), 7 days a week. Evening access is permitted for park scheduled event participants only. Unauthorized motor vehicles and motorbikes are not permitted.

== Preparations ==
Visitors should bring basic supplies when exploring the Preserve. For example: two hikers needed to be rescued by the Los Angeles County Sheriff's Department in 2007 after becoming lost while on the trails and paths. Although experienced hikers, and being well-equipped for the hike, the two veered off a path that had been obscured by recent fires and were unable to find their way back to a trail. One was suffering from hypothermia so the other used a cell phone to call 911, and they were rescued later that day. Guided walks, hikes, and evening programs are offered in the park by the Santa Monica Mountains National Recreation Area.

Dogs on 6-foot leashes under the immediate control of the owner are allowed on the designated trails.

== See more ==
- Flora of the Santa Monica Mountains
- Wildlife corridor
- Rock art of the Chumash people
