= Tapo Canyon =

Wildlife park in California

Tapo Canyon Regional Park
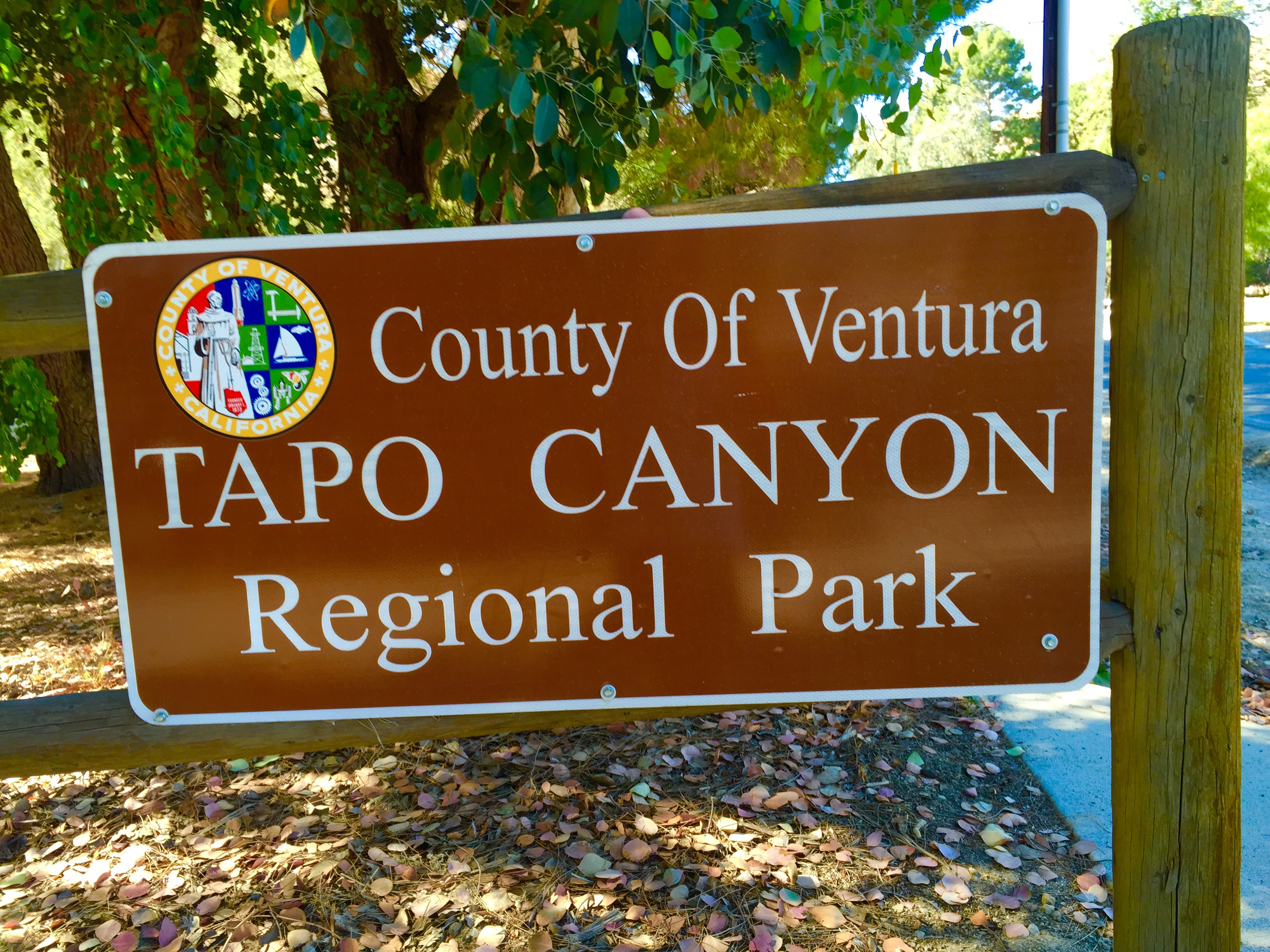
- Sign by entrance
- Interactive map of Tapo Canyon Regional Park
- Type: Open-space park
- Location: Simi Valley, CA
- Coordinates: 34°19′25″N 118°42′37″W
- Area: 210 acres (85 ha)
- Created: 1969
- Operator: Santa Monica Mountains Conservancy
- Status: Open daily 07:30 AM to 8 PM

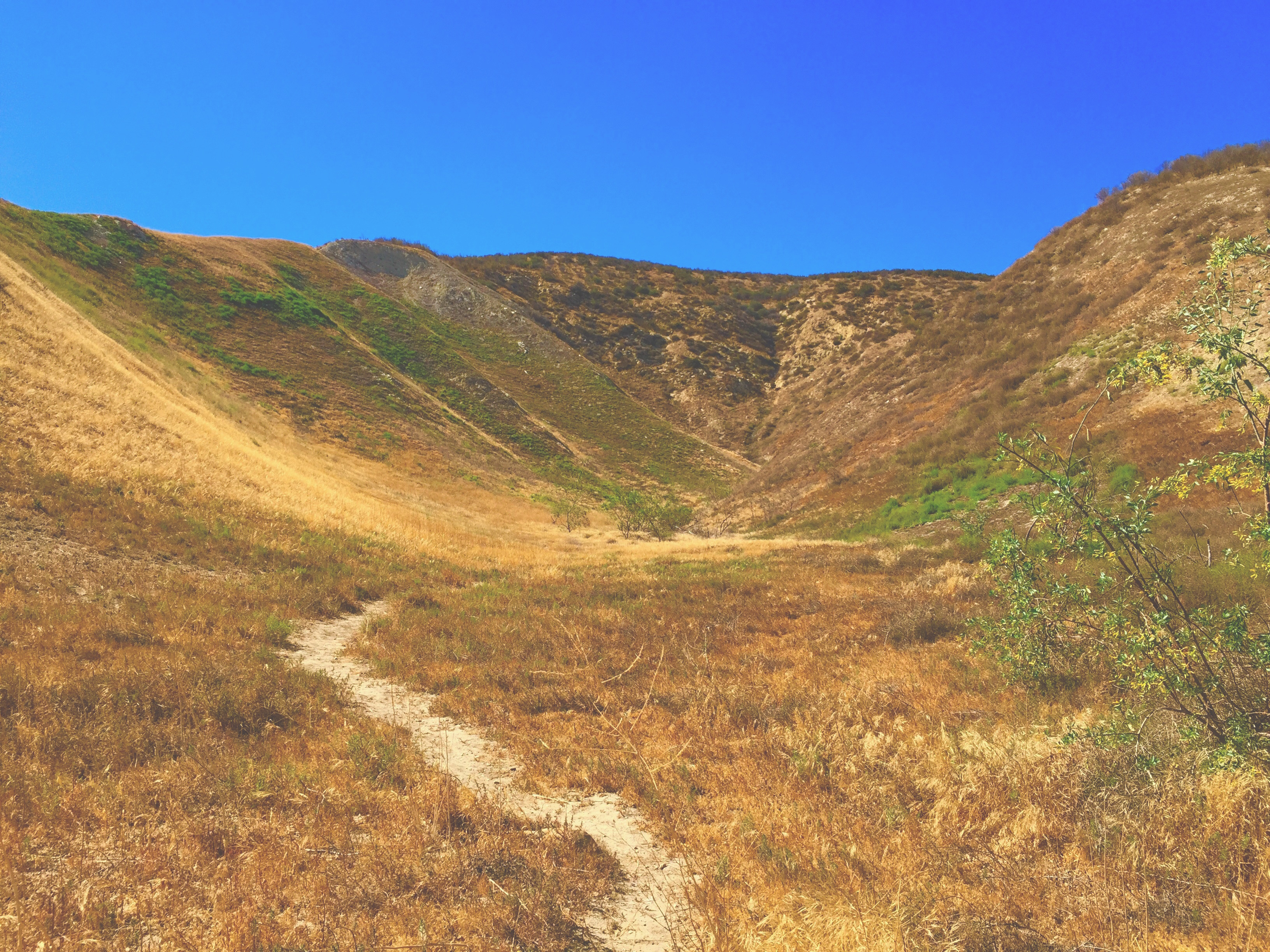
Canyon and trailhead by the park entrance.

Tapo Canyon (Ventureño: Ta’apu, pronounced \tap’ō\) is a series of canyons and a wildlife corridor in the western Santa Susana Mountains, north of Simi Valley in Ventura County, Southern California. It's the main filming location of the well-known TV show Little House on the Prairie in the 1970s.

Tapo Canyon Regional Park is an open-space park and camping ground administered by the Santa Monica Mountains Conservancy. It is situated in the midst of the many canyons and rolling hills found in this particular region of northern Simi Valley. Today, the park offers recreational activities as mountain biking, horseback-riding, hiking, as well as campgrounds, picnic areas, and sixteen RV camp hook ups. The elevation here goes up as far as 2300 feet, which offers great panoramic views along much of its hiking trails up on the hills. It is a 3.4 mile hike south of the Santa Clara River in Piru, CA, and about 4 miles west of Pico Canyon in Santa Clarita, Los Angeles County.

== History ==
Geologists believe that during the Miocene Epoch 7-5 million years ago, the Pacific Ocean extended far inland and covered much of the Simi Valley, leaving only tips of various mountains visible. Among the evidence for this has been the deposit of 1500–3000 feet of marine sediment in northern Simi Valley, in approximate alignment with what is now Tapo Canyon. Tapo Canyon, which name derives from the Chumashan-Ventureño Ta’apu, was the largest amongst the three Chumash villages in the Simi Valley, along with Kimishax and Shimiyi (which gave Simi Valley its name). The Chumash village of Ta’apu, which was situated next to Tapo Creek in Tapo Canyon, was a thriving village for thousands of years during the pre-colonial era. The name Ta’apu is believed by historians to perhaps be referring to a sulphur deposit. The last village chief of Ta’apu, Zalasuit, was later baptized as Salvador at the Mission San Fernando in 1804. Three Chumash-Indians from Ta’apu survived the mission period: Tiburcio Cayo (1793-1844), Maria del Pilar Siguisalmeulgel (1807-1860), and Leopoldo Cuticucagele (1799-1865). There have been numerous Chumash artifact findings in Tapo Canyon, including a Chumash Effigy Tablet, discovered by Philip W. Gillibrand in 1900. The tablet, measuring ten inches long and 6.25 inches wide, is believed by historians to be a Chumash calendar. Historians believe the Roman Catholic Father Vincent de Santa Maria of the San Buenaventura Mission described Tapo Canyon in his letter dated September 3, 1795: "After examining everything, we found the water to be not abundant, the valley very narrow and dismal, the soil salinous, and consequently unserviceable." During the 1850s, wine-maker Don José De La Guerra started wine-grape harvesting and made wine in his Tapo Canyon vineyards. By 1858 he had moved his base of the El Rancho Simi Operation from Simi Adobe to Tapo Canyon.

Even though the population of the Tapo Canyon area decreased during the end of the Mission times, the early 20th century brought new opportunities to the area, and Tapo Canyon was once again an organized settlement in 1911. The population especially grew when Scrab Oil Company began oil-production in Tapo Canyon in 1910. The first well opened with a production of as much as 300 barrels of oil per day, and a pipeline was shortly built down to the Southern Pacific depot where the storage tanks were situated. In 1916, Edward Doheny bought 7,500 acres of land in the area surrounding Tapo Canyon and paid $110,000 for the property and another $250,000 for the oil rights for the area. Tapo Canyon was acquired by Ventura County as Tapo Canyon Regional Park in 1969. The Tapo Canyon Fire in 1985 burned 16,000 acres of land surrounding Tapo Canyon. Because of several other wildfires in the area, the Tapo Canyon Regional Park was closed from 2003 to 2008.

== Geography ==
Tapo Canyon is located in the northernmost-area of Simi Valley, within the Santa Susana Mountains. It is administrated as a part of the Tapo Canyon Regional Park by the Santa Monica Mountains Conservancy.

It is located in the midst of the vast nature areas of the Santa Susana Mountains, a few miles south of Piru, CA and 4 miles west of the city limits of Santa Clarita, the third largest city of neighboring Los Angeles County. Its physical geography is dominated by rolling hills, lined with shrubs and bushes, numerous canyons, oak trees, and vegetated creek-beds and creeks. Tapo Canyon Regional Park is located at 4651 Tapo Canyon Road in Simi Valley, CA.

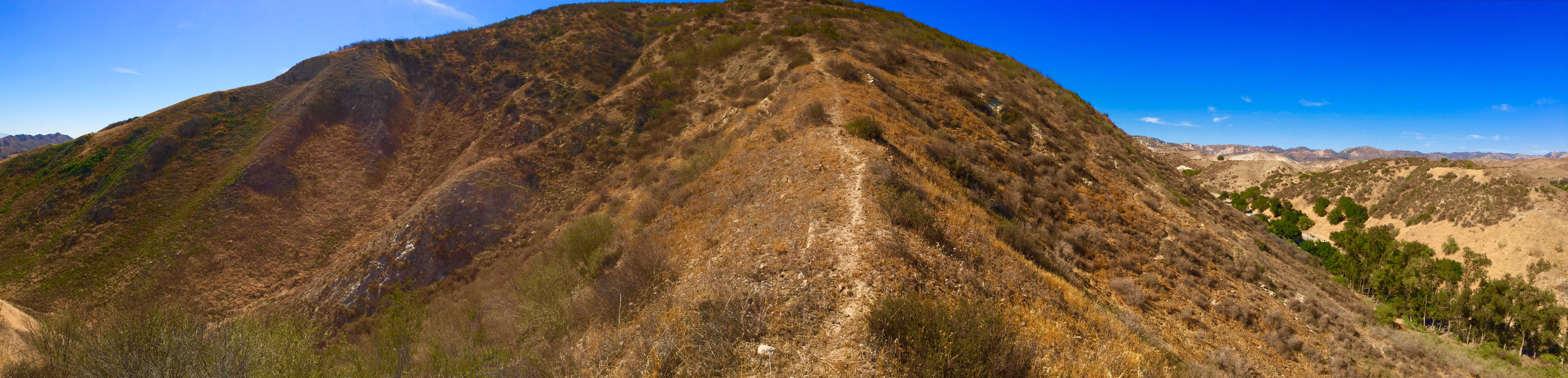
View from one of the uphill hiking trails in Tapo Canyon Regional Park.

== Fauna ==
The fauna is characterized by species adopted to the semi-arid climate, including various species of snakes and desert reptiles, but as it functions as a wildlife corridor, it is also home to mountain lions, coyotes, bobcats, grey foxes, raptors, opossums, and many other species of wildlife. Several fossils have been found in the area, including the Paleogene Leptoreodon and Eocene Boavus.
