= Tierra Rejada Park =

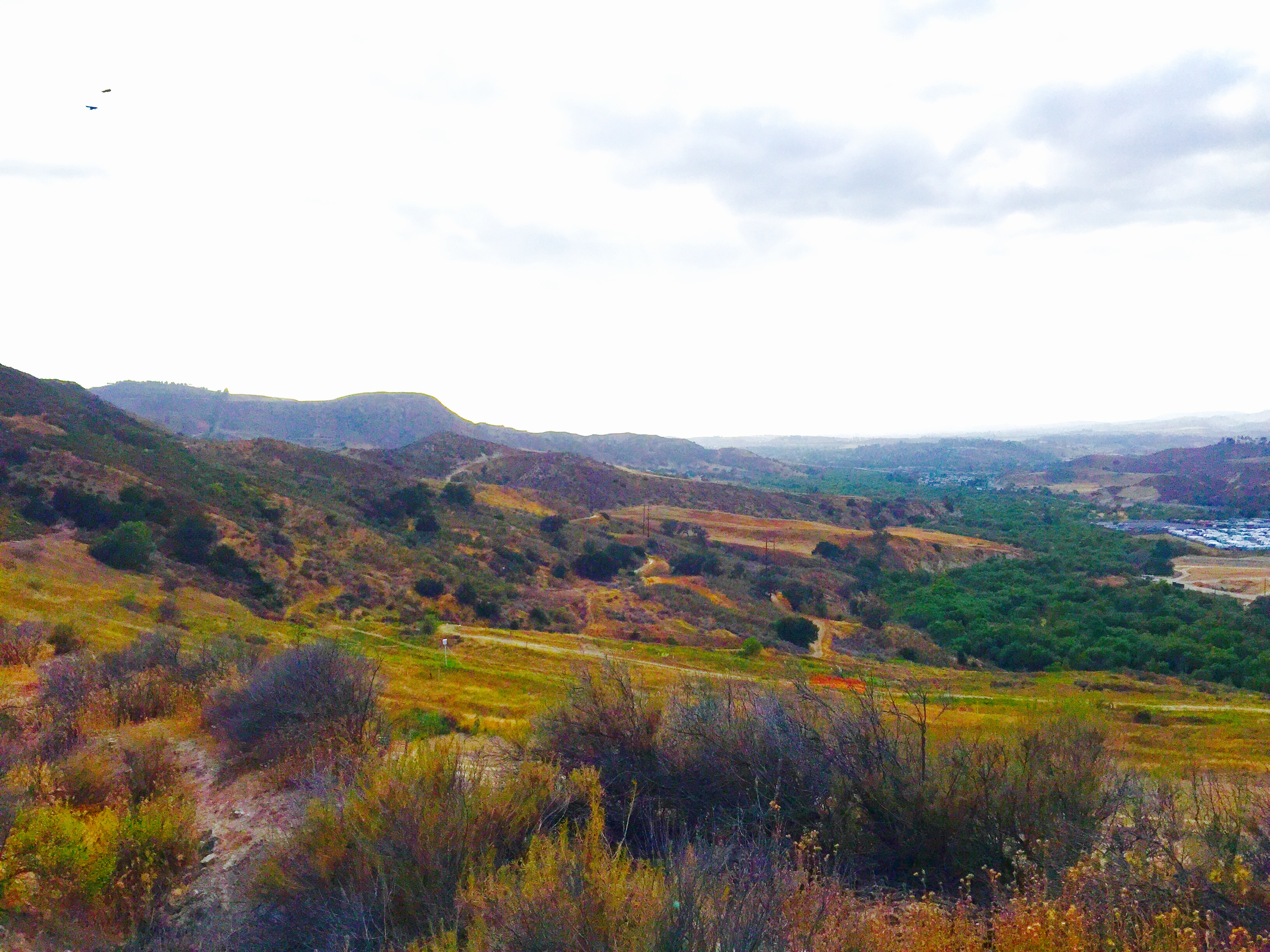
- Interactive map of Tierra Rejada Park
- Type: Open-space park
- Location: Simi Valley, CA
- Coordinates: 34°16′34″N 118°48′22″W
- Area: 150 acres (61 ha)
- Operator: Rancho Simi Recreation and Park District
- Status: Open

Tierra Rejada Park is a 150-acre (61 ha) park located in the northern Simi Hills foothills, in southwestern Simi Valley city near Moorpark, in Ventura County, California.

There are several trails leaving from the park to: Moorpark; Mount McCoy, Oak Canyon, Coyote Hills Park, Long Canyon, Wood Ranch Open Space, and other open-space nature areas in southwestern Simi Valley. Trails up into the Simi Hills, offer panoramic views of the Simi Valley, the Santa Rosa Valley, eastern Moorpark, and the western Santa Susana Mountains.

The main Tierra Rejada Trailhead is adjacent to the Arroyo Simi wash, and the city is planning trailheads from the park along the new Arroyo Simi Greenway along the creek.

== Access ==
Near Highway 118 (Simi Valley Freeway) or Highway 23 (Moorpark Freeway), the main entrance is at Tierra Rejada Road and Stargaze Place.

== See also ==
- Parks in Ventura County, California
- Simi Hills]\ topics
