= Sinaloa (disambiguation) =

Sinaloa is a state of Mexico.

Sinaloa may also refer to:

== Places ==
- Sinaloa de Leyva, a town in Sinaloa
- Sinaloa Lake, a reservoir in Simi Valley, California
- Sinaloa Municipality, a municipality in Sinaloa
- Sinaloa River, a river of Mexico

== Sports clubs ==
- Dorados de Sinaloa, a Mexican professional football club

== Birds ==
- Sinaloa crow, a species of bird in the family Corvidae
- Sinaloa martin, a species of bird in the family Hirundinidae
- Sinaloa wren, a species of bird in the family Troglodytidae

== Other uses ==
- Sinaloa Cartel, a drug-trafficking and organized crime group based in Sinaloa
- Operation Sinaloa, an anti-drug trafficking operation in Sinaloa

== See also ==
- El Chapo de Sinaloa, a Mexican musician
- El Potro de Sinaloa, a Mexican musician
- Los Cuates de Sinaloa, a Mexican band
