= Sinaloa Lake =

Man-made reservoir in California, United States

- Robertson Lake
- Location within California
- Location: Simi Valley, Ventura County, California
- Coordinates: 34.256°N 118.793°W
- Type: reservoir
- Surface area: 12-acre (4.9 ha)

Sinaloa Lake is a 12-acre (4.9 ha) reservoir in southwestern Simi Valley. The lake is adjacent to the Sinaloa Golf Course and neighborhood. It has a 35-foot (11 m) deep earth dam which was constructed between 1925 and 1929. It has been owned by the Sinaloa Lake Owners Association since the early 1960s. The lake was drained in 1983 after heavy rains, but was rebuilt in 2000. Originally known as Robertson Lake, it is now named for Sinaloa, Mexico. Fish species include crappie, largemouth bass and others.

The surrounding community of Sinaloa Lake is an unincorporated area of Ventura County, and voted not to be incorporated into the city of Simi Valley on September 27, 1966.

Nearby Bard Lake is situated above Sinaloa Lake in an adjacent part of the same watershed.
