= Bard Lake =

- Wood Ranch Reservoir
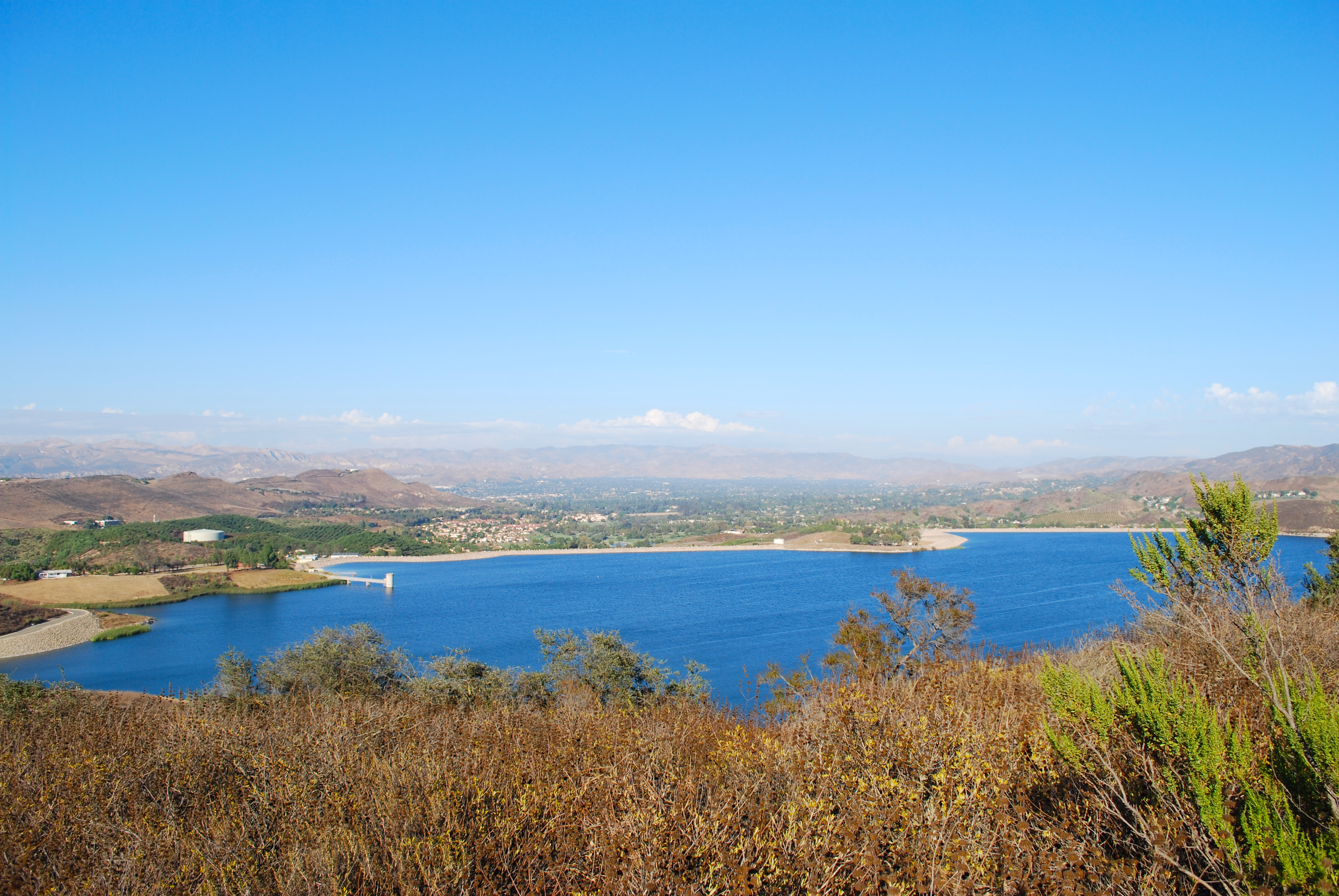
- View of Bard Lake from Sunset Hills Trail.

- Location within California
- Location: Simi Valley, California
- Coordinates: 34.238°N 118.826°W
- Type: reservoir
- Surface area: 231 acres (93 ha)
- Water volume: 11,000 acre-feet (14,000,000 m^{3})

Bard Lake, also known as Wood Ranch Reservoir, is a 231-acre (93 ha) reservoir which is the largest lake in Simi Valley, California. It is east of the intersection of Olsen Road and Moorpark Freeway, near the border between Simi Valley and Thousand Oaks. Built in 1965, Bard Lake is 416 feet (127 m) high with a capacity of 11,000 acre-feet (3.6×10^{9} US gal). It is an earthen dam which is owned by the Calleguas Water District.

Although the lake is fenced, there are numerous hiking trails in the area. Sunset Hills Open Space is a 410-acre (170 ha) adjacent preserve with hiking trails. Known for its rich avifauna, some of the bird species found here include White-tailed kites, Northern harriers, Anna's hummingbirds and Red-tailed hawks. Other fauna include rabbits, coyotes, cougars, bobcats, roadrunners, quail and turkey vultures.

Nearby Sinaloa Lake is situated below Bard Lake in an adjacent part of the same watershed.
