= Mount McCoy (Simi Valley) =

Mountain in California, United States

- Verde Hill
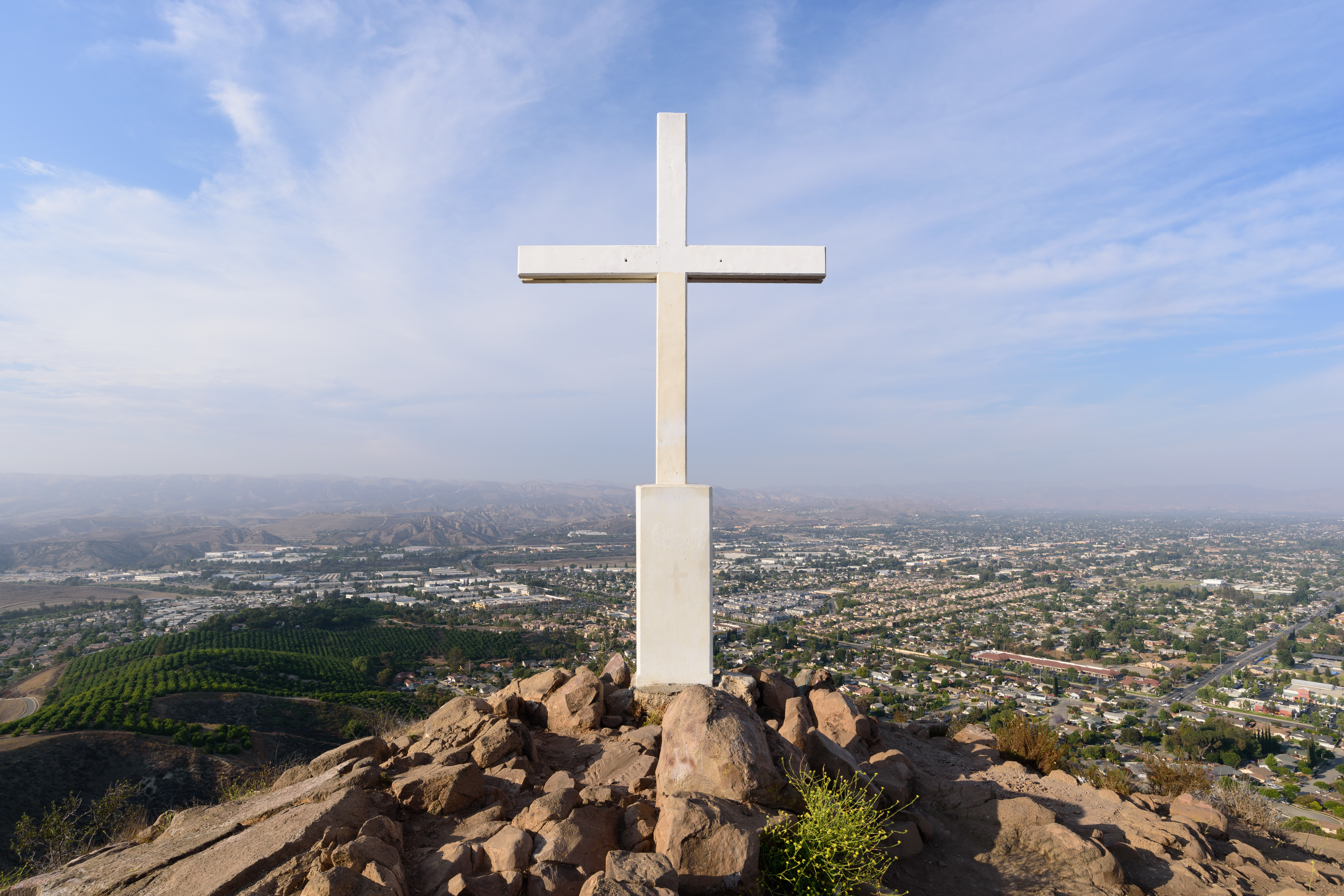
- Mount McCoy Cross with Simi Valley in the distance.

Highest point
- Elevation: 1,330 ft (405 m) NAVD 88
- Prominence: 35 ft (11 m)
- Coordinates: 34°15′45″N 118°48′16″W

Geography
- Location within California
- Location: Ventura County, California, U.S.
- Topo map: USGS Simi Valley West

Mount McCoy (previously known as Verde Hill) is a 1,325-foot-high peak in Simi Valley, California known for its characteristic 12 foot white cross on the top. There are numerous trails leading to Mount McCoy, which sits in a 200 acres (81 ha) nature area operated by the Rancho Simi Recreation and Park District (RSRPD), while the cross and its immediate surroundings are owned by the Simi Valley Historical Society. By 1813, the cross on Mt. McCoy was a landmark for the Friars and others in the Simi Valley.

An 1858 map of the Simi Valley does show a cross on Mt. McCoy, but a newer cross was erected by Robert E. Harrington in 1921, and a concrete one later in 1941. Mount McCoy has been a landmark for the area since before the town was founded. In 1986, Mount McCoy was designated Ventura County Landmark No. 106. The main trailhead is located at 2 Washburn Street at the western end of Simi Valley. A trailhead to a shorter hiking trail is located around 56-58 Presidential Drive on the way to the Ronald Reagan Presidential Library.

From the top of Mount McCoy there are views of the Simi Hills and Simi Valley, as well as Simi Peak, open-space areas and the Ronald Reagan Presidential Library. There are also views of the Santa Monica Mountains, Mount Baldy, the San Gabriel Mountains and the Topatopa Mountains, and on clear days, even the Ojai backcountry, the Channel Islands and the Pacific Ocean. It is one of two crosses overlooking the Simi Valley, the other one being situated by the Santa Susana Pass and Rocky Peak by the Santa Susana portion of eastern Simi Valley.

== See also ==
- Ventura County Historic Landmarks & Points of Interest
