= Simi Valley, California =

City in California, United States

- City
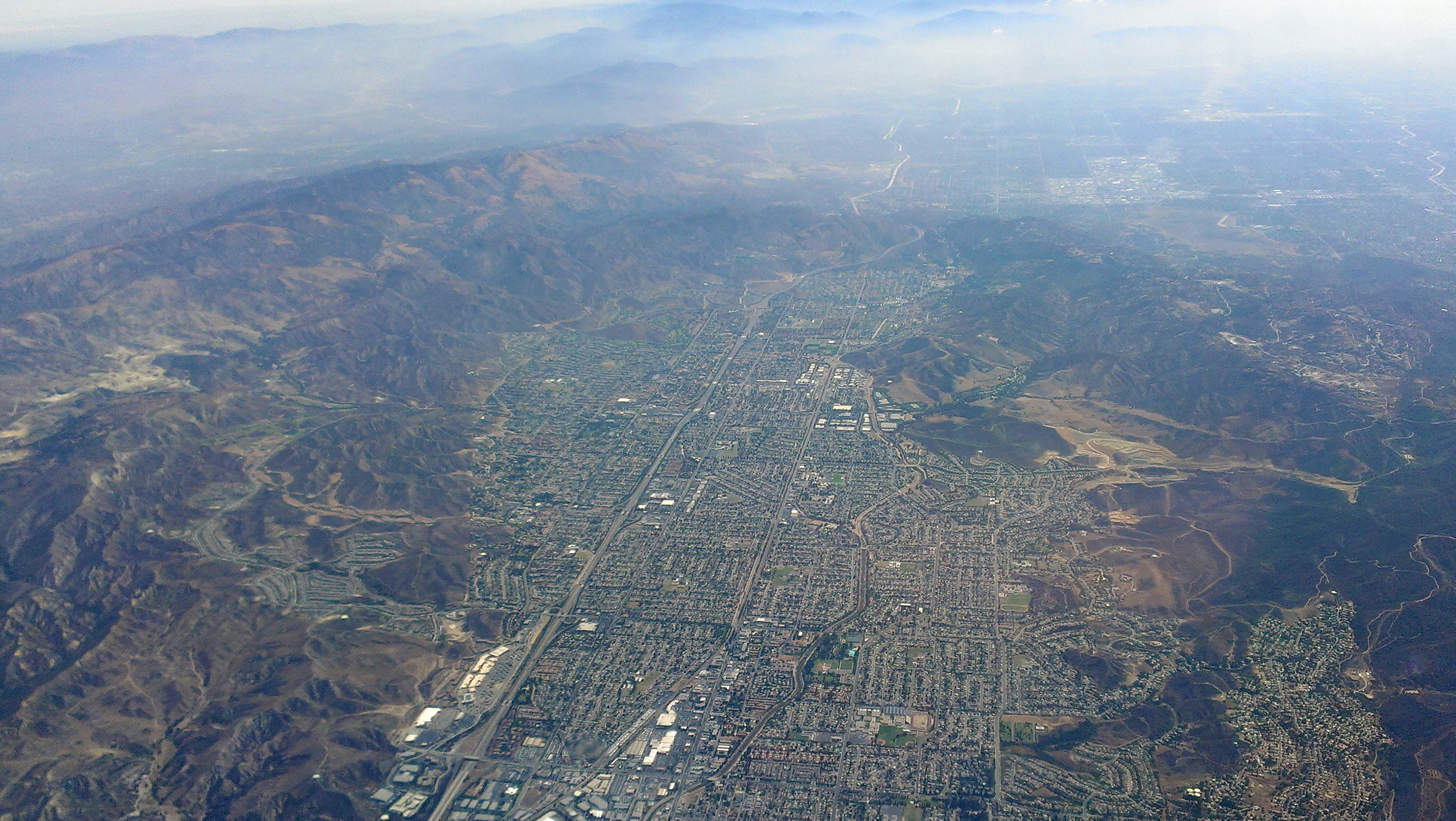
- Aerial view of Simi Valley in 2014

- Flag Seal
- Interactive map of Simi Valley, California
- Location in the United States Simi Valley (California) Simi Valley (the United States)
- Coordinates: 34°16′16″N 118°44′22″W
- Country: United States
- State: California
- County: Ventura
- Incorporated: October 10, 1969

Government
  - Type: Council-Manager
  - Body: City Council: Elaine P. Litster (N); Rocky Rhodes (N); Joseph Ayala (N)
  - Mayor: Dee Dee Cavanaugh (R)
  - Mayor Pro Tem: Mike Judge (R)
  - City manager: Samantha C. Argabrite (N)

Area
  - Total: 42.25 sq mi (109.43 km^{2})
  - Land: 41.54 sq mi (107.60 km^{2})
  - Water: 0.71 sq mi (1.83 km^{2}) 1.81%
- Elevation: 768 ft (234 m)

Population (2020)
  - Total: 126,356
  - Rank: 3rd in Ventura County; 48th in California; 232nd in the US
  - Density: 3,041.5/sq mi (1,174.3/km^{2})
- Time zone: UTC−8 (Pacific)
  - Summer (DST): UTC−7 (PDT)
- ZIP Codes: 93062, 93063, 93064, 93065, 93093, 93094, 93099
- Area code: 805/820
- FIPS code: 06-72016
- GNIS feature IDs: 1661450, 2411904
- Website: www.simivalley.org

Simi Valley (/ˈsiːmiː/; Chumash: Shimiyi) is a city in the valley of the same name in southeastern Ventura County, California, United States. It is 37 miles (60 km) northwest of Downtown Los Angeles, making it part of the Greater Los Angeles Area. Simi Valley borders Thousand Oaks, Moorpark, and the Chatsworth neighborhood of Los Angeles. As of the 2020 census, Simi Valley had a population of 126,356. The city of Simi Valley is surrounded by the Santa Susana Mountains and the Simi Hills, west of the San Fernando Valley, and northeast of the Conejo Valley. It grew as a bedroom community for the cities in the Los Angeles area and the San Fernando Valley when a freeway was built over the Santa Susana Pass.

The Ronald Reagan Presidential Library, where the former president was buried in 2004, is in Simi Valley.

== History ==
=== Chumash/pre-colonial period ===
Simi Valley's name is derived from the Chumash word Shimiyi, which refers to the stringy, thread-like clouds that typify the region. The name could have originated from the strands of mist from coastal fog that move into the Oxnard Plain and wind their way up the Calleguas Creek and the Arroyo Las Posas into Simi Valley. The origin of the name was preserved because of the work of the anthropologist John P. Harrington, whose brother, Robert E. Harrington lived in Simi Valley. Robert Harrington later explained the name: "The word Simiji in Indian meant the little white wind clouds so often seen when the wind blows up here and Indians living on the coast, would never venture up here when those wind clouds were in the sky. The word Simiji was constructed by whites to the word Simi. There are other explanations about the name Simi, but this one was given to me by my brother who worked over 40 years for the Smithsonian Institution and it seems most plausible to me".

Three Chumash settlements existed in Simi Valley during the Mission period in the late 18th and early 19th century: Shimiyi, Ta'apu (present-day Tapo Canyon), and Kimishax or Quimicas (Happy Camp Canyon west of Moorpark College). There are many Chumash cave paintings in the area containing pictographs, including the Burro Flats Painted Cave in the Burro Flats area of the Simi Hills, located between the Simi Valley, West Hills, and Bell Canyon. The cave is located on private land owned by NASA. Other areas containing Chumash Native American pictographs in the Simi Hills are by Lake Manor and Chatsworth.

=== The Rancho period ===
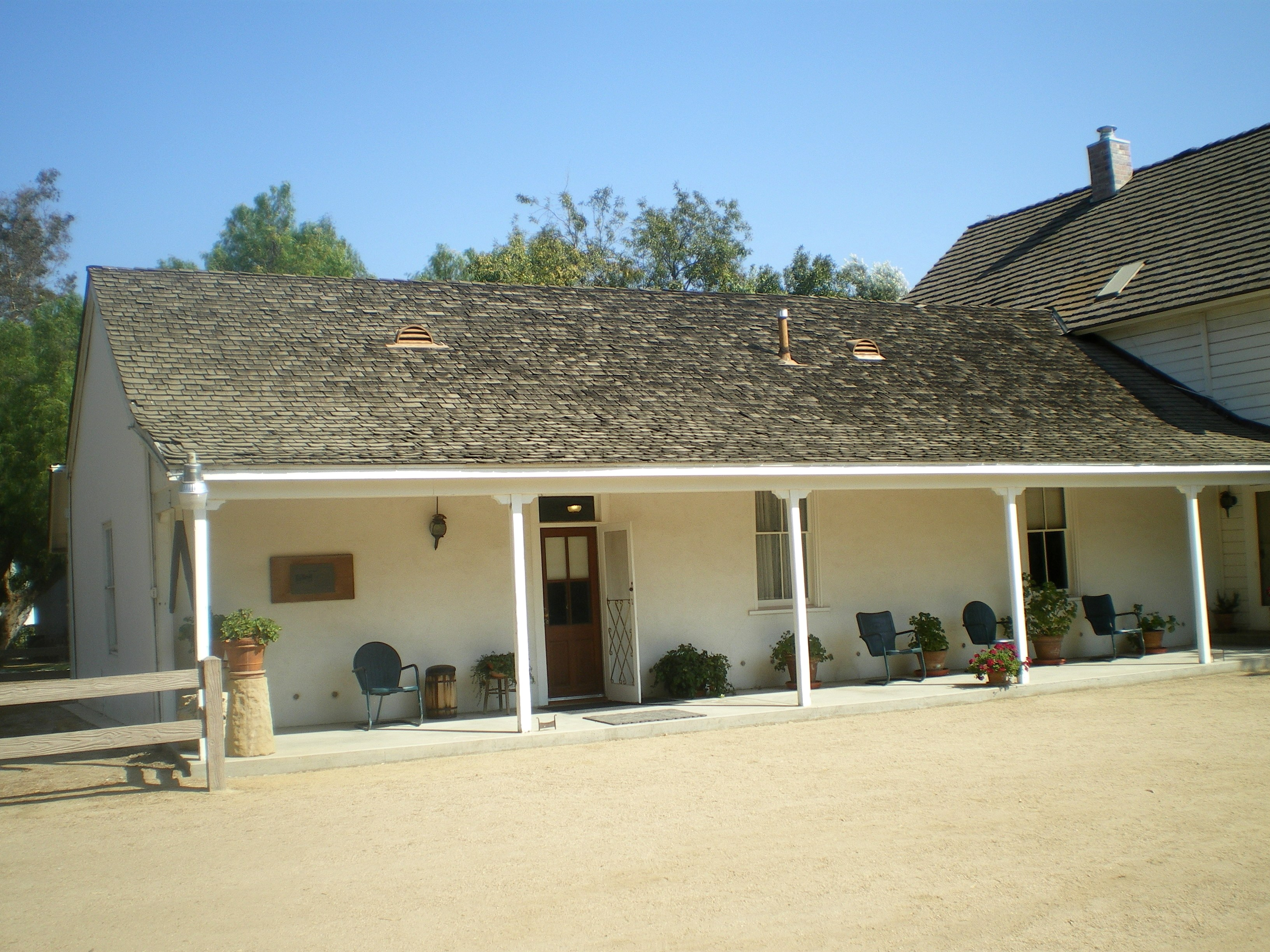
Rancho Simi was granted in 1795 to the Pico family of California. Pictured is the Simi Adobe.

The first Europeans to visit Simi Valley were members of the Spanish Portolá expedition (1769–1770), the first European land entry and exploration of the present-day state of California. The expedition traversed the valley on January 13–14, 1770, traveling from Conejo Valley to San Fernando Valley. They camped near a native village in the valley on the 14th.

Rancho Simí, also known as Rancho San José de Nuestra Señora de Altagracia y Simí, was a 113,009-acre (457 km^{2}) Spanish land grant in eastern Ventura and western Los Angeles counties granted in 1795 to Santiago Pico. After Santiago Pico's death in 1815, the Rancho was regranted to Santiago's sons Javier Pico and his two brothers, Patricio Pico and Miguel Pico, members of the prominent Pico family of California. Rancho Simí was the earliest Spanish colonial land grant within Ventura and Santa Barbara Counties. The name derives from Shimiji, the name of the Chumash Native American village here before the Spanish. It was the largest Spanish or Mexican land grant given in Ventura County, and one of the largest given in California. The Simi Adobe-Strathearn House, later the home of Robert P. Strathearn and family, served as the headquarters of the rancho.

José de la Guerra y Noriega, a Captain of the Santa Barbara Presidio, who had begun to acquire large amounts of land in California to raise cattle, purchased Rancho Simí from the Pico family in 1842. After Jose de la Guerra death in 1858, the sons of Jose de la Guerra continued to operate the ranchos. The end of their prosperity came when several years of drought in the 1860s caused heavy losses. In 1865, the De la Guerras lost the ownership of El Rancho Simí excluding the Rancho Tapo. El Rancho Tapo was part of the original 113,009-acre Rancho Simí grant, but sometime around 1820–1830, the Rancho Tapo came to be thought of as a separate place within Rancho Simí. The last of the De la Guerras to live in Simí Valley retreated to a 14,400-acre portion of the original rancho that was known as the Tapo Rancho. As late as February 1877, Juan De la Guerra was reported in county newspapers to be preparing to plant walnuts in the Tapo, which appears to be the final mention of their farming in relation to the original Simí grant.

The De la Guerra heirs tried every legal means, but by the 1880s, the Rancho Tapo also slipped from their ownership, as had the rest of the Rancho.

=== The Pioneer period ===
The Pioneer, or 'American,' period in Simi Valley began with the 96,000-acre purchase of El Rancho Simí by an eastern speculator named Thomas A. Scott (1814–1882), who had made his money as an investor in the Pennsylvania Railroad during the Civil War. He was president of the Pennsylvania Railroad, and a partner in Philadelphia and California Petroleum Company. Scouts came to California to purchase lands, and thus Scott acquired El Rancho Simí (1865). His goal was to locate sites for oil, since the first oil well had been developed in Titusville, Pennsylvania just a few years earlier (1859). Within a short time, a 27-year-old man named Thomas Bard was sent west by Scott to manage the California properties. In the late 1880s, Simí Land and Water Company was formed to see to the selling of the huge rancho in ranch-size properties. Some American farmers had begun to lease land in the greater Rancho Simí for farming.

The earliest Anglo American ranchers showed up in Simí Valley in the late 1860s into the 1870s. Charles Emerson Hoar was given the title of "first American farmer" by early Simí historian Janet Scott Cameron. He had purchased the Hummingbird's Nest Ranch in the northeast corner of the Valley, and he leased land from the new owners of the Simí Rancho for raising sheep, already a proven way of making a living.

Much of the Simí Rancho land continued, as in Spanish days, to be used for raising sheep, cattle and grain. Wheat was more likely to prosper here than in the rest of the county, being free of wheat leaf rust, a fungal disease. Barley soon became the predominant grain crop.

Agriculture and ranching dominated the landscape through the 1950s. Citrus, walnuts and apricots were all grown in Simi Valley. In the early 1960s modern residential development began to take place.

=== Modern residential development ===
Prior to modern residential development, Simí was an agricultural community, with ranch houses dotting the valley. 1957 and 1958 brought the first 'tract' housing developments when the Dennis and Ayhens, Wright Ranch and Valley Vista tracts were built, a rapid increase in residential development took place beginning in 1960. The population which was 4,073 in 1950 doubled to 8,110 in 1960. By 1970 the population in Simi is reported by the census as 59,832.

=== Four communities prior to modern residential development ===
The pioneers arrived in the late 1860s – 1870s and ever since, this has been 'The Valley of Simi.' But, not all the communities in the valley were known as 'Simi.' There was the township of Simi (known as 'Simiopolis' for about a six-month period in 1888). In the valley there were also the communities of Santa Susana, Community Center and the Susana Knolls (known first as Mortimer Park) at different points in time.

Simi – In late 1887–1888, the incorporation of Simi Land and Water Company came about. El Rancho Simí was divided into ranches and farms by that corporation, and advertised for sale to midwestern and New England states. An investor group, the California Mutual Benefit Colony of Chicago, purchased land and laid out a townsite (located between First and Fifth Streets and from Los Angeles south to Ventura Ave), named it 'Simiopolis' and shipped twelve pre-cut, partially assembled houses from a lumberyard in Chicago via rail to Saticoy, then brought by wagon to Simi. These are known as 'colony houses.' This was the first 'neighborhood' in Simi. Stores sprung up on Los Angeles Ave, and the first Simi School was built in 1890 on Third and California Streets, and was used until Simi Elementary was built in the mid-1920s.

Santa Susana – In 1903 the Santa Susana Train Depot was built, and the railroad was complete through Simi Valley, except for the tunnel, which was completed in 1904. A small business community grew up near the Santa Susana Train Depot, which was located on the north side of Los Angeles Ave, just east of Tapo Street. Over time residential developments followed and the town of Santa Susana was born. The Depot was moved in 1975 by Rancho Simi Recreation and Park District to its current location off of Kuehner.

Community Center – In 1922 L.F. Roussey laid out the small development which became known as Community Center. The driving force behind this development was the need for a High School in Simi Valley, as well as an elementary school in a more central location in the valley. The first graduating class from Simi High School was 1924, Simi Elementary was completed in 1926, The Methodist Church (which is now the Cultural Arts Center) was built in 1924. Numerous houses were built in Community Center in the 1920s and 1930s. The Simi Valley Woman's Club was located there as well (the building which served as the clubhouse for the Woman's Club was moved from the town of Simi). The Woman's Club club house was used by many individuals and organizations as a community meeting place.

Mortimer Park (the Susana knolls) – The area that is now the Knolls was a nearly 1,800-acre parcel of land (730 ha) that was purchased by Mr. and Mrs. Lewis T. Mortimer in the early 1920s. They planned on selling the lots for cabins, or vacation homes. The lots were very small (30 x 50 feet), and the Mortimers did not take the mountainous nature of the land into account, so quite often the lots were not buildable. Oftentimes several lots were needed to build structures. In 1944 the Garden Club, an active community organization in the area petitioned the county supervisors to change the name of Mortimer Park to the Susana Knolls.

The first attempt to incorporate the towns of Simi, the area known as Community Center (93065) and Santa Susana (93063) in 1966 was unsuccessful. The second attempt in 1969 was successful, with residents voting 6,454 to 3,685 in favor of incorporation. 59% of eligible voters turned out for this vote. Susana Knolls is an unincorporated area of the Valley. Voters also voted whether to call this newly incorporated city 'Santa Susana' or 'Simi Valley.' The name Simi Valley garnered 2,000 more votes than Santa Susana.

=== Other items of historical interest ===
==== Santa Susana Field Laboratory ====
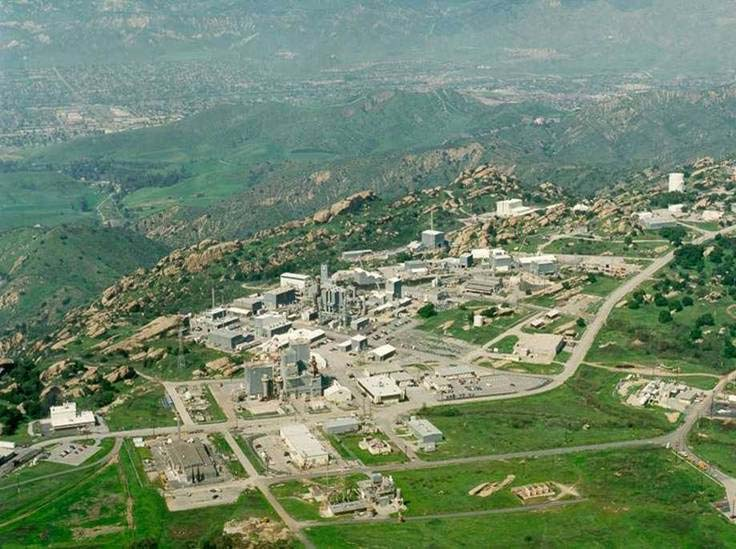
1990 aerial view of the Energy Technology Engineering Center at the Santa Susana Field Laboratory, Simi Hills, Simi Valley

The 2,848 acres (1,153 ha) Santa Susana Field Laboratory located in the Simi Hills, was used for the development of pioneering nuclear reactors and rocket engines beginning in 1948. The site was operated by Atomics International and Rocketdyne (originally both divisions of the North American Aviation company). The Rocketdyne division developed a variety of liquid rocket engines. Rocket engine tests were frequently heard in Simi Valley. The Atomics International division of North American Aviation designed, built and operated the Sodium Reactor Experiment, which in 1957 became the first United States commercial nuclear reactor to supply electricity to a public power system, when it powered the city of Moorpark (the government owned BORAX-III reactor had previously powered Arco, Idaho for around an hour in 1955). The last nuclear reactor operated at SSFL in 1980 and the last rocket engine was produced in 2006. The SSFL has been closed to development and testing. The site is undergoing investigation and removal of the nuclear facilities and cleanup of the soil and groundwater. The Boeing Company, the US DOE, and NASA are responsible for the cleanup.

In July 1959, the Sodium Reactor Experiment suffered a serious incident when 13 of the reactor's 43 fuel elements partially melted resulting in the controlled release of radioactive gas to the atmosphere. The reactor was repaired and returned to operation in September 1960. The incident at the Sodium Reactor Experiment has been a source of controversy in the community. Technical analysis of the incident intended to support a lawsuit against the current landowner (The Boeing Company) asserts the incident caused the much greater release of radioactivity than the accident at Three Mile Island. Boeing's technical response concludes the monitoring conducted at the time of the incident, shows only the allowable amount of radioactive gasses were released, and a Three Mile Island-scale release was not possible. The case was settled, it is reported, with a large payment by Boeing. In September 2009, The U.S. Department of Energy sponsored a public workshop where three nuclear reactor experts shared their independent analysis of the July 1959 incident.

The Santa Susana Field Laboratory also hosted the Energy Technology Engineering Center. The center performed the design, development and testing of liquid metal reactor components for the United States Department of Energy from 1965 until 1998.

The Santa Susana Field Laboratory includes sites identified as historic by the American Institute of Aeronautics and Astronautics and by the American Nuclear Society. The National Register of Historic Places listed Burro Flats Painted Cave is located within the Santa Susana Field Laboratory, on a portion of the site owned by the U.S. Government. The drawings within the cave have been termed "the best preserved Indian pictograph in Southern California".

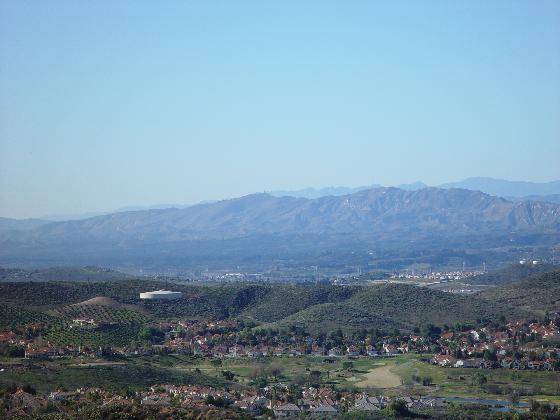
Simi Valley Scenic, 2007, with the Topatopa Mountains in background

== Geography ==
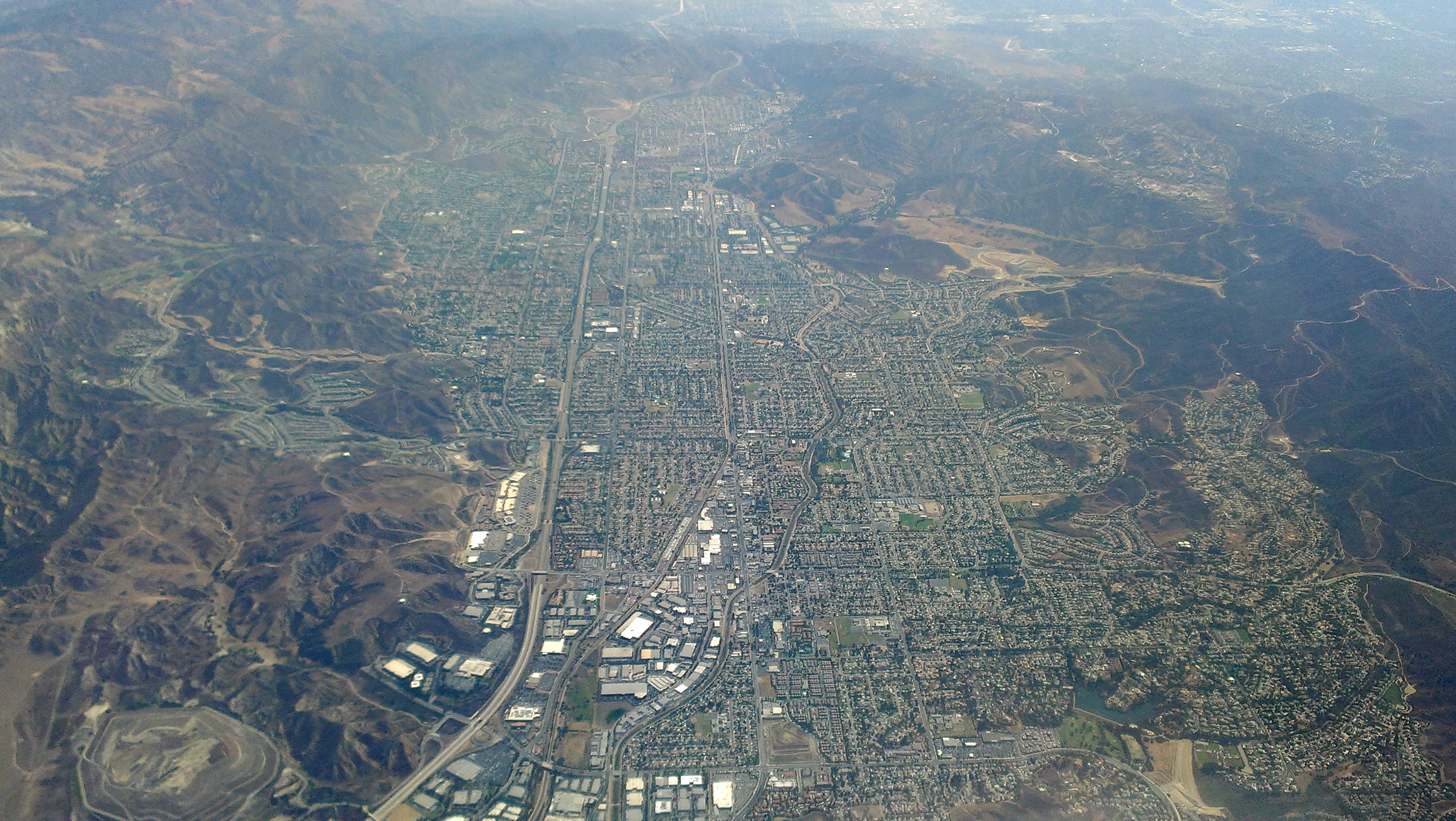
Simi Valley aerial from west

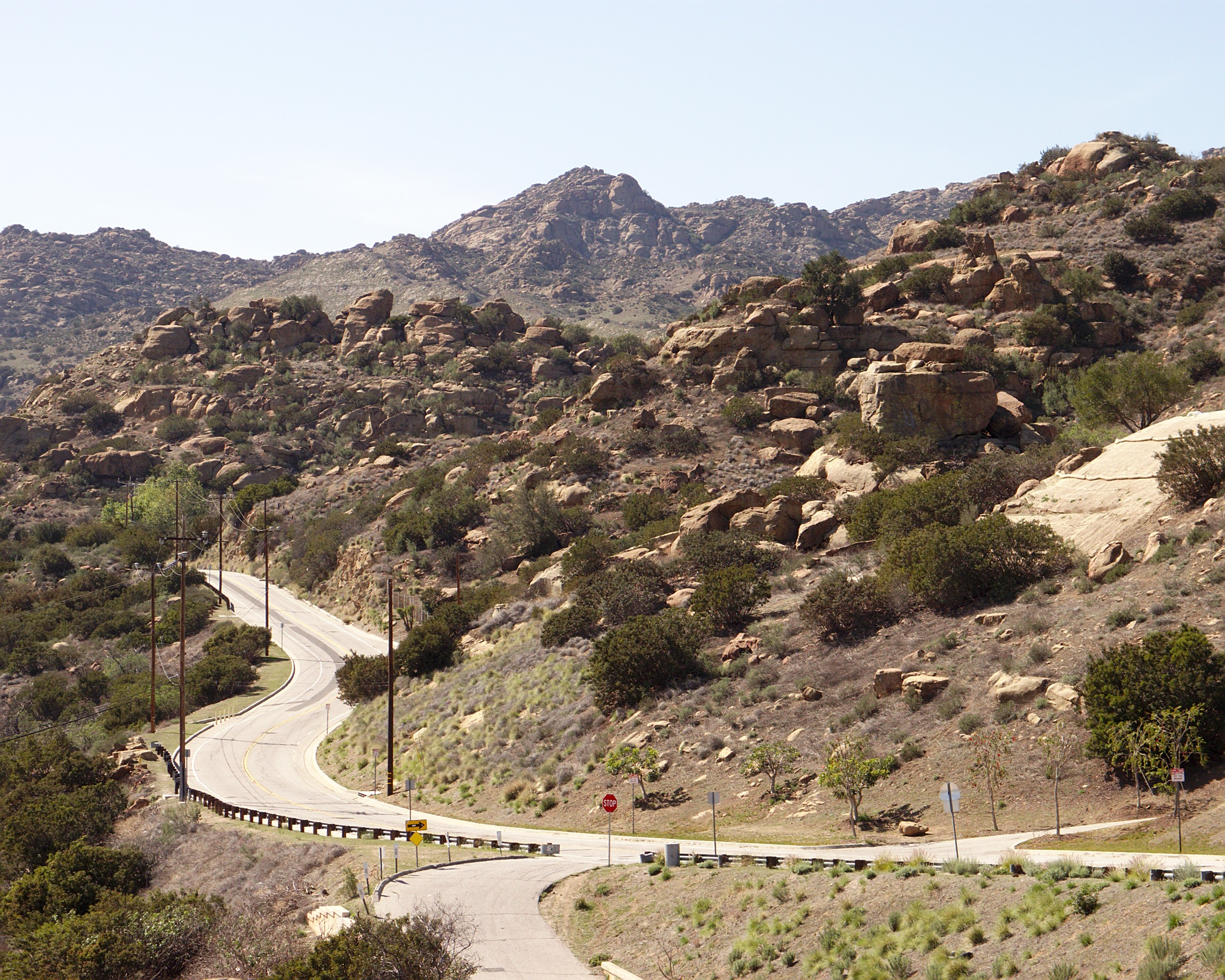
Santa Susana Pass is a mountain pass in the Simi Hills connecting the San Fernando Valley and the Simi Valley.

Simi Valley is a city located in the very southeast corner of Ventura County, bordering the San Fernando Valley in Los Angeles County, and is a part of the Greater Los Angeles Area. The city of Simi Valley primarily consists of the eponymous valley itself. The city of Simi Valley borders the Santa Susana Mountains to the north, the Simi Hills to the east and south, and is adjacent to Thousand Oaks to the southwest and Moorpark to the west. Simi Valley is connected to the nearby San Fernando Valley by the Santa Susana Pass in the extreme east of Simi Valley. The syncline Simi Valley is located in the western part of the region called the Transverse Ranges. While the Santa Susana Mountains separate the valley from the Los Padres National Forest in the north, the Simi Hills separate it from Conejo Valley in the south. In the extreme east is Rocky Peak, one of Santa Susana Mountains' highest peaks, which is a dividing line between Ventura County to the west and Los Angeles County to the east. On the other side of the valley, in the extreme west side of Simi Valley is Mount McCoy, which may be most known for its 12 ft. concrete cross that sits at its peak. The physiographical valley is a structural as well as a topographic depression. The Simi Valley, just as neighboring San Fernando Valley, owes its existence and shape to the faulting and folding of the rocks. It is essentially a structural valley and not wholly the work of erosion. It is drained by the Calleguas Creek and also its principal tributary, Conejo Creek. Both of these originate in the Santa Susana Mountains.

According to the United States Census Bureau, the city has a total area of 42.2 sq mi (109.4 km^{2}), comprising 41.5 sq mi (107.4 km^{2}) of land and 0.77 sq mi (2.0 km^{2}), or 1.81%, of it is water. Simi Valley is located northwest of the Los Angeles neighborhood of Chatsworth and approximately 30 mi (50 km) from Downtown Los Angeles, 380 mi (610 km) south of San Francisco, 160 mi (260 km) north of San Diego, and 350 mi (560 km) south of Sacramento. Commutes to Los Angeles are usually via the State Route 118 (Ronald Reagan Freeway) or the Southern California Metrolink commuter train, which makes several daily trips from Simi Valley. Simi Valley has a mediterranean climate. Temperate variations between day and night tend to be relatively big. The mean annual temperature is 64.1 degrees (17.8 °C), while the annual precipitation is 18.39 inches (467 mm). The precipitation remains less than one inch for seven months – April until October, – while the precipitation exceeds four inches in the two wettest months – January and February. While the mean temperature is at its lowest at 53.6 degrees (12.0 °C) in December, the mean temperature in July and August exceeds 76 degrees (24 °C).

Simi Valley has been the victim of several natural disasters, including the flood of 1967, the storm of 1983, the 1988 lightning strike, as well as the 1994 Northridge earthquake and numerous wildfires.

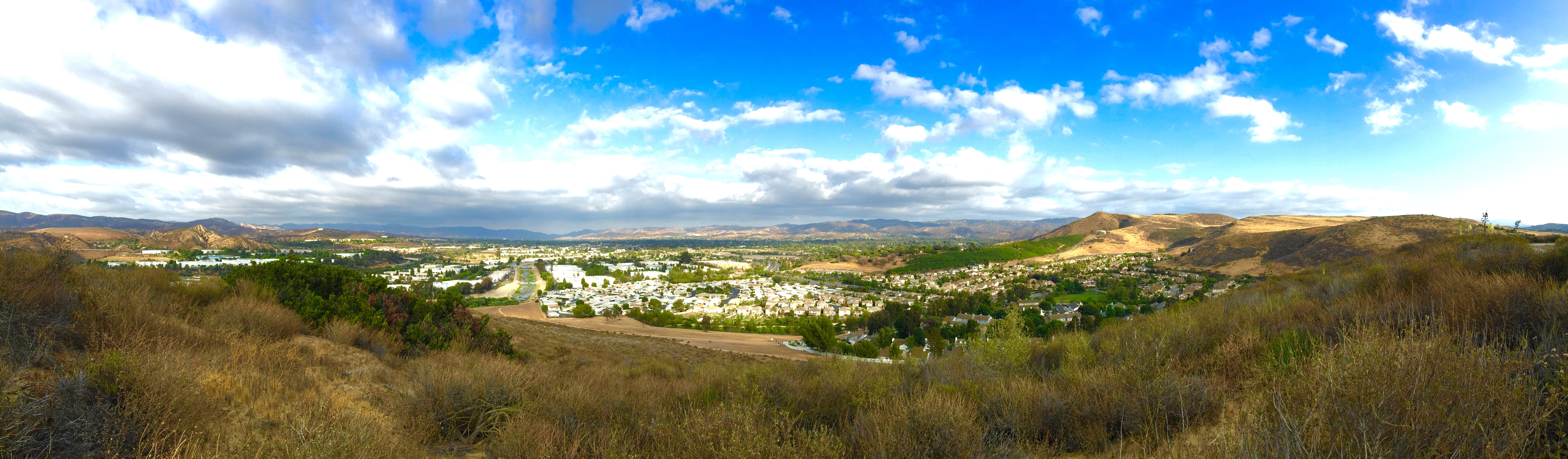
Panoramic skyline of Simi Valley from its western end, Tierra Rejada Park, with bordering Simi Hills in the far-background to the north, south, and east

=== Climate ===
Simi Valley has a warm and dry climate during summer when mean temperatures tend to be in the 70s °F (low 20s °C). The city's climate cools during winter when mean temperatures tend to be in the 50s °F (low 10s °C). Because of its relatively low elevation, the Simi Hills typically experience rainy, mild winters. Snow is rare in the Simi Hills, even in the highest areas. The warmest month of the year is August with an average maximum temperature of 96 °F (36 °C), while the coldest month of the year is December with an average minimum temperature of 38 °F (3 °C). Temperature variations between night and day tend to be relatively large during summer, with a difference that can reach 38 °F (21 °C), and moderate during winter with an average difference of 29 °F (16 °C).

The annual average precipitation in Simi Valley is 17.9 inches (450 mm). Winter months tend to be wetter than summer months. The wettest month of the year is February with an average rainfall of 4.8 inches (120 mm). Simi Valley gets 18 inches (460 mm) of rain per year, while the United States average is 37. Snowfall is 0 inches (0 mm), while the U.S. average is 25 inches (640 mm) of snow per year. The number of days with measurable precipitation is 25. On average, there are 277 sunny days in Simi Valley per year. The July high is approximately 96 °F (36 °C). The January low is 39 °F (4 °C). The record low is 18 degrees Fahrenheit (−8 °C) (recorded in February 1989) and the record high is 116 degrees Fahrenheit (47 °C) (recorded in August 1985).

Climate data for Simi Valley, California
Month	Jan	Feb	Mar	Apr	May	Jun	Jul	Aug	Sep	Oct	Nov	Dec	Year
Record high °F (°C)	93 (34)	94 (34)	101 (38)	105 (41)	113 (45)	113 (45)	115 (46)	116 (47)	115 (46)	110 (43)	99 (37)	96 (36)	116 (47)
Mean daily maximum °F (°C)	69 (21)	70 (21)	73 (23)	78 (26)	83 (28)	88 (31)	95 (35)	97 (36)	93 (34)	84 (29)	75 (24)	68 (20)	81 (27)
Mean daily minimum °F (°C)	39 (4)	41 (5)	42 (6)	45 (7)	49 (9)	53 (12)	57 (14)	57 (14)	55 (13)	49 (9)	43 (6)	38 (3)	47 (9)
Record low °F (°C)	19 (−7)	18 (−8)	26 (−3)	30 (−1)	33 (1)	36 (2)	42 (6)	42 (6)	38 (3)	27 (−3)	23 (−5)	20 (−7)	18 (−8)
Average precipitation inches (mm)	3.62 (92)	4.81 (122)	2.86 (73)	1.02 (26)	0.31 (7.9)	0.07 (1.8)	0.02 (0.51)	0.05 (1.3)	0.14 (3.6)	0.93 (24)	1.34 (34)	2.76 (70)	17.93 (456.11)
Source: The Weather Channel.

=== Natural hazards ===
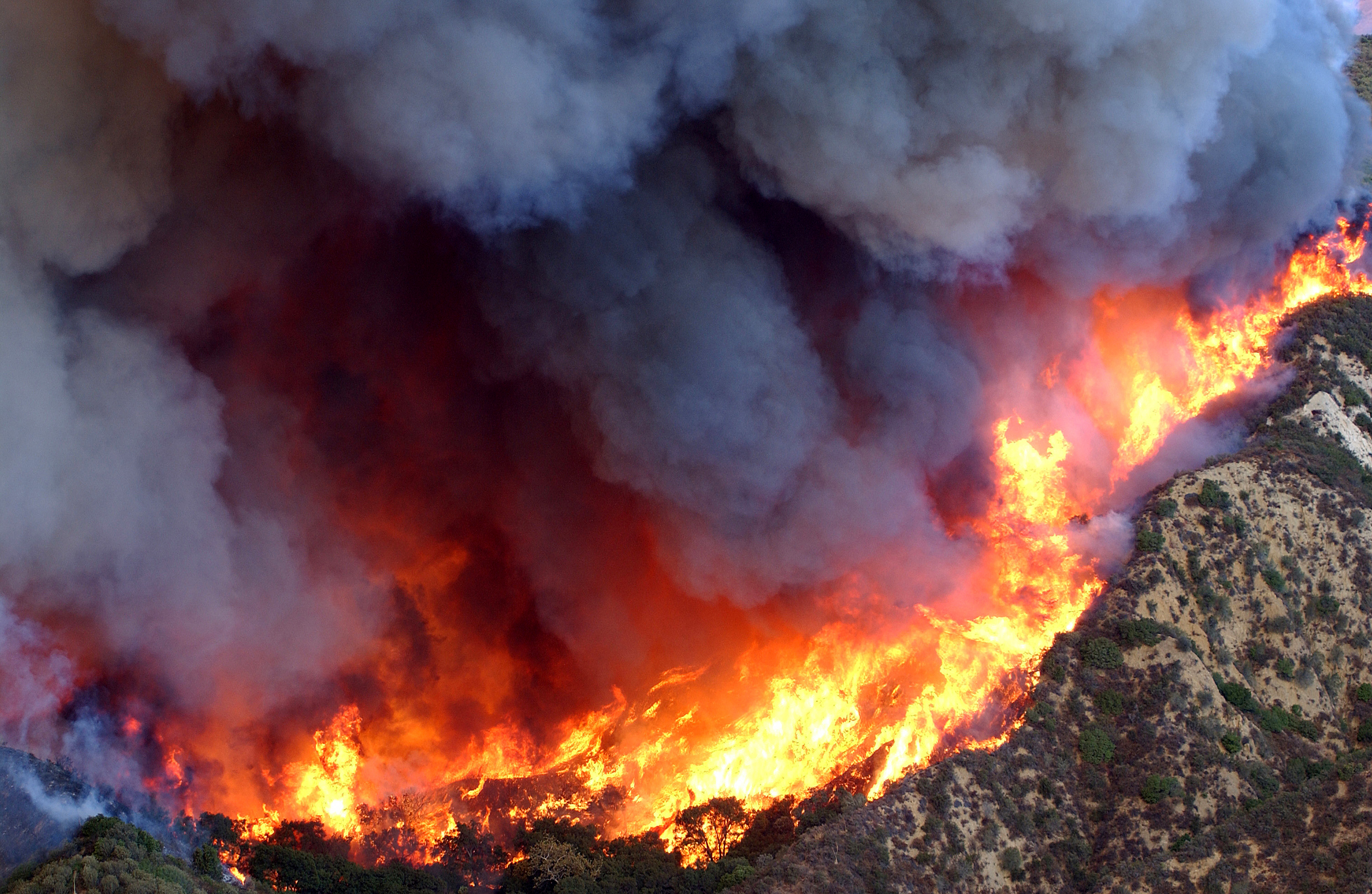
Wildfire in the Simi Hills, 2003. U.S. Air Force C-130 Hercules pilots flew eight C-130 cargo airplanes and dropped 129,600 gallons of retardant on the fire.

An aspect of Simi Valley's location, situated beside the Simi Hills, is that it lies in a high-risk area for the wildfires that sweep through Southern California's mountain ranges every few years. Simi Valley is also at risk for earthquakes. The valley is surrounded by faults; the closest ones being the Santa Rosa Fault to the Northwest, the Northridge Hills Fault to the Northeast, and the Chatsworth Fault to the South. In 1994, portions of Simi Valley received significant damage from the Northridge earthquake.

==== Wildfires ====
In autumn 2003, the Simi Fire burned about 108,000 acres (440 km^{2}). A 2005 fire started on September 28 and burned an estimated 7,000 acres (30 km^{2}). On September 29, the fire was estimated to be 17,000 acres (70 km^{2}). More than 1,000 firefighters worked against the tricky combination of dry brush, low humidity and temperatures in the high 90s °F (high 30s °C) along the line that divides Los Angeles and Ventura counties. The fire was later brought under control and extinguished, without serious injury. Three homes were lost in outlying areas, but none within the city limits.

=== Neighborhoods ===
Neighborhoods include:

- The Greek Tract
- The Texas Tract
- Wood Ranch - As of 2025, it is the newest major housing development in the city, and is named for the ranch that used to be in its place.
- The Bridle Path
- Sinaloa Lake
- The Presidential Tract
- Big Sky
- Downtown/Los Angeles Avenue Corridor - The Envision Simi Valley Specific Plan was created to provide a framework for mixed-use development to turn this portion of the city into a walkable area where people work and live.
- Santa Susana - A portion of this neighborhood was included in the Envision Simi Valley Specific Plan, to create a framework for redevelopment into a secondary, smaller downtown.
- Santa Susana Knolls
- Old Town
- Corriganville
- Community Center
- Patricia
- The Italian Tract

=== Wildlife ===
The Simi Hills are a wildlife corridor linkage from the Santa Monica Mountains to the Topatopa Mountains, San Gabriel Mountains, and other Transverse Ranges further east. Simi Hills' undeveloped native habitat provides routes that protect larger land wildlife of the Santa Monica Mountains from genetic isolation. Large sections of the Simi Hills are protected by parks and open space preserves.

== Demographics ==
Historical population
Census	Pop.	Note	%±
1970	59,832		—
1980	77,500		29.5%
1990	100,217		29.3%
2000	111,351		11.1%
2010	124,237		11.6%
2020	126,356		1.7%
U.S. Decennial Census

Historical racial profile	2020	2010	2000	1990	1980
White	60.0%	75.3%	81.3%	88.2%	92.5%
—Non-Hispanic (NH)	54.0%	62.8%	72.7%	79.9%	86.2%
Black or African American (NH)	1.5%	1.3%	1.2%	1.5%	1.1%
Hispanic or Latino (of any race)	28.4%	23.3%	16.8%	12.7%	9.3%
Asian (NH)	10.5%	9.1%	6.2%	5.3%	-
American Indian (NH)	0.2%	0.3%	0.4%	0.5%	-
Other (NH)	5.4%	3.2%	2.7%	0.1%	3.4%

=== 2020 ===
Simi Valley, California – Racial and Ethnic Composition Note: the US Census treats Hispanic/Latino as an ethnic category. This table excludes Latinos from the racial categories and assigns them to a separate category. Hispanics/Latinos may be of any race.
Race / ethnicity (NH = Non-Hispanic)	Pop. 2000	Pop. 2010	Pop. 2020	% 2000	% 2010	% 2020
White alone (NH)	80,908	78,009	68,251	72.66%	62.79%	54.01%
Black or African American alone (NH)	1,348	1,602	1,861	1.21%	1.29%	1.47%
Native American or Alaska Native alone (NH)	457	356	302	0.41%	0.29%	0.24%
Asian alone (NH)	6,932	11,328	13,264	6.23%	9.12%	10.50%
Pacific Islander alone (NH)	143	148	177	0.13%	0.12%	0.14%
Some other race alone (NH)	191	278	708	0.17%	0.22%	0.56%
Mixed race or multi-racial (NH)	2,643	3,578	5,872	2.37%	2.88%	4.65%
Hispanic or Latino (any race)	18,729	28,938	35,921	16.82%	23.29%	28.43%
Total	111,351	124,237	126,356	100.00%	100.00%	100.00%

Before the 1960s, Simi Valley once boasted a strong community of Latino families, many of whom worked for white ranchers. However, the housing boom in the 1960s and 1970s attracted many white Americans leaving urban areas in Los Angeles and the San Fernando Valley. This turned Simi Valley into a predominately white city, but the percentage of those who identified as non-Hispanic white began to decrease from 86.2% in 1980 to 54% in 2020.

=== 2010 ===
Ancestry in Simi Valley
Origin	percent
German American	16.7%
Mexican American	16.2%
English American	11.3%
Italian American	8.5%
Multiracial American	4.6%
French American	3.4%
Polish American	3.1%
Indian American	2.7%
Norwegian American	2.3%
Swedish American	2.3%
Filipino American	2.2%
Scottish American	2.1%
Dutch American	2.0%
Other	22.6%

The 2010 United States census reported that Simi Valley had a population of 124,237. The population density was 2,940.8 inhabitants per square mile (1,135.4/km^{2}). The racial makeup of Simi Valley was 93,597 (75.3%) White, 1,739 (1.4%) African American, 761 (0.6%) Native American, 11,555 (9.3%) Asian, 178 (0.1%) Pacific Islander, 10,685 (8.6%) from other races, and 5,722 (4.6%) from two or more races. Hispanic or Latino of any race were 10,938 persons (23.3%); 16.2% of Simi Valley's population were Mexican-American, 1.2% Salvadoran, 0.9% Guatemalan, 0.6% Puerto Rican, 0.6% Peruvian, 0.3% Cuban, 0.3% Argentine, 0.2% Honduran, 0.2% Nicaraguan, and 0.2% Ecuadorian. Among Asian-Americans, 2.7% of Simi Valley's population were Indian-Americans, 2.2% Filipino, 1.2% Chinese, 1.0% Vietnamese, 0.7% Korean, 0.5% Japanese, 0.2% Thai, 0.1% Pakistani. The majority of Simi Valley's population was made up of Caucasian-Americans; the largest groups of whites were 16.7% German-American, 11.3% English, 8.5% Italian, 3.4% French, 3.1% Polish, 2.3% Norwegian, 2.3% Swedish, 2.1% Scottish and 2% Dutch.

The Census reported that 123,577 people (99.5% of the population) lived in households, 482 (0.4%) lived in non-institutionalized group quarters, and 178 (0.1%) were institutionalized. There were 41,237 households, out of which 16,765 (40.7%) had children under the age of 18 living in them, 24,824 (60.2%) were opposite-sex married couples living together, 4,659 (11.3%) had a female householder with no husband present, 2,214 (5.4%) had a male householder with no wife present. There were 1,975 (4.8%) unmarried opposite-sex partnerships, and 291 (0.7%) same-sex married couples or partnerships. A total of 7,087 households (17.2%) were made up of individuals, and 3,013 (7.3%) had someone living alone who was 65 years of age or older. The average household size was 3.00. There were 31,697 families (76.9% of all households); the average family size was 3.33.

The population was spread out, with 31,036 people (25.0%) under the age of 18, 11,088 people (8.9%) aged 18 to 24, 33,890 people (27.3%) aged 25 to 44, 35,046 people (28.2%) aged 45 to 64, and 13,177 people (10.6%) who were 65 years of age or older. The median age was 37.8 years. For every 100 females, there were 96.6 males. For every 100 females age 18 and over, there were 94.4 males. There were 42,506 housing units at an average density of 1,006.1 per square mile (388.5/km^{2}), of which 30,560 (74.1%) were owner-occupied, and 10,677 (25.9%) were occupied by renters. The homeowner vacancy rate was 1.2%; the rental vacancy rate was 4.6%. 93,181 people (75.0% of the population) lived in owner-occupied housing units and 30,396 people (24.5%) lived in rental housing units.

=== 2000 ===
As of the 2000 United States census, there were 111,351 people, 36,421 households, and 28,954 families residing in the city. The population density was 1,097.3/km² (2,841.9/mi²). There were 37,272 housing units at an average density of 367.3/km² (951.3/mi²). The racial makeup of the city was 81.33% White, 1.26% Black or African American, 0.70% Native American, 6.33% Asian, 0.14% Pacific Islander, 6.50% from other races, and 3.74% from two or more races. 16.82% of the population were Hispanic or Latino of any race.

There were 36,421 households, out of which 42.5% had children under the age of 18 living with them, 63.9% were married couples living together, 10.7% had a female householder with no husband present, and 20.5% were non-families. 14.7% of all households were made up of individuals, and 4.9% had someone living alone who was 65 years of age or older. The average household size was 3.04 and the average family size was 3.33.

In the city, the population was spread out, with 28.4% under the age of 18, 7.9% from 18 to 24, 32.9% from 25 to 44, 23.1% from 45 to 64, and 7.6% who were 65 years of age or older. The median age was 35 years. For every 100 females, there were 97.9 males. For every 100 females age 18 and over, there were 95.6 males.

=== Income ===
According to a 2022 estimate, the median income for a household in the city was $112,144. 7.02% of the population and 7.4% of families were below the poverty line. In 2022, the median income for a household in Simi Valley has increased to $112,114 according to the U.S. Census Bureau. The median per capita income for the past 12 months (2021) was $51,324. Sales tax was at 7.25% and income taxes were at 8.00%. The current unemployment rate was at 4.10% with a 0..46% recent job growth compared to the National Unemployment Rate of 5.20% and a 1.59% job growth. The median cost of homes in Simi Valley was $704,200 with mortgages at a median of $3,047.

== Economy ==
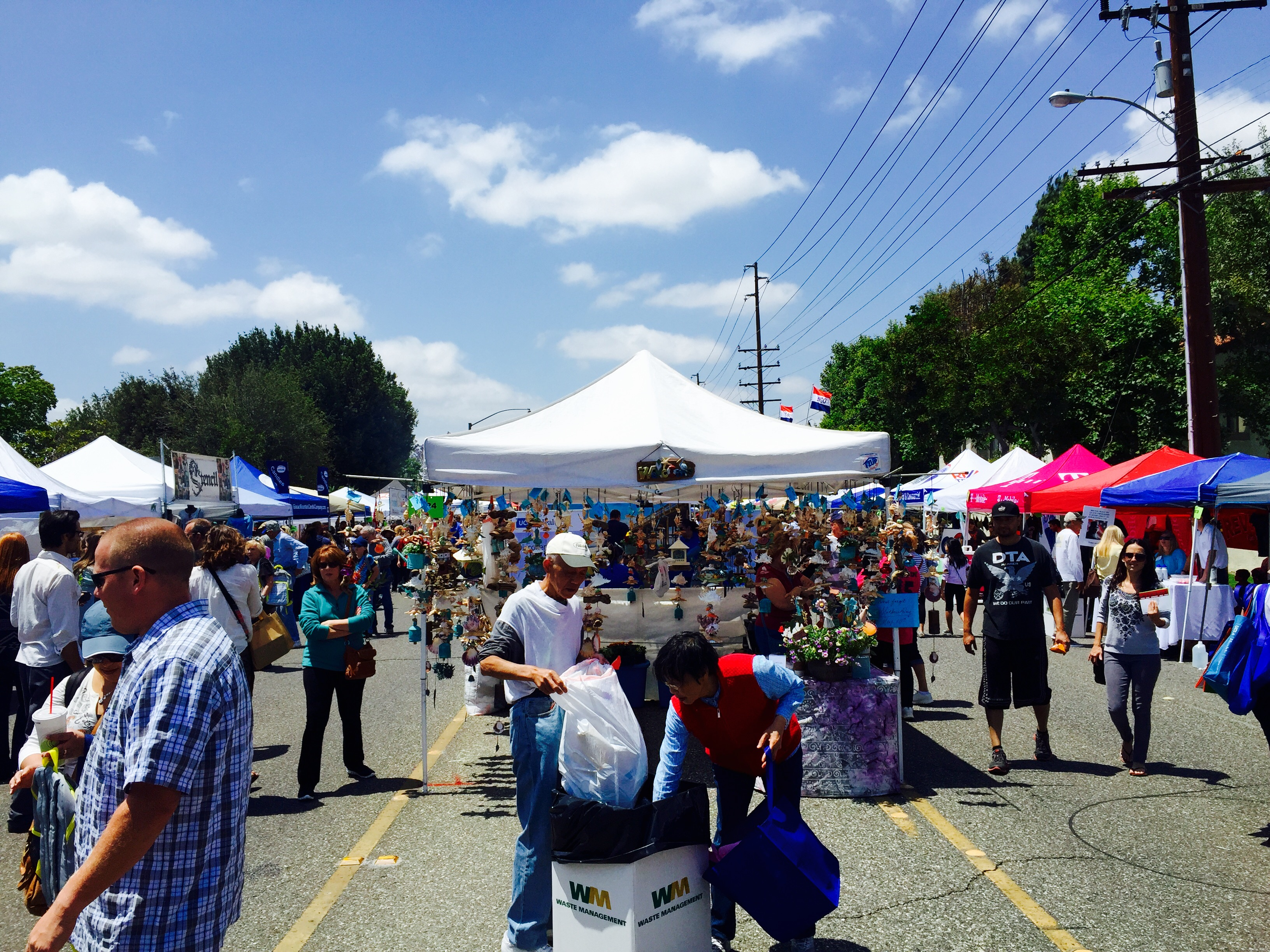
Simi Valley Street Fair, in 2015

Commuting to Los Angeles for work is done by 27% of Simi Valley residents, with 20% working within Simi Valley.

The primary industry is machinery and tools with 69 firms, and the secondary is the metal industry with 51 firms. Other industries include lumber/wood products, food, plastic products, apparel/textiles and minerals.

A division of Countrywide Financial had been partially headquartered in the city from the mid-1990s into 2008. In 2008 Countrywide Financial was bought out by Bank of America.

=== Top employers ===
According to the city's 2023-2024 Annual Comprehensive Financial Report, the top employers in the city are:

#	Employer	# of employees
1	Simi Valley Unified School District	2,051
2	Adventist Health, Simi Valley	971
3	Aerovironment, Inc.	870
4	Meggitt Safety Systems, Inc.	683
5	City of Simi Valley	509
6	Milgard Windows & Doors	456
7	Rancho Simi Parks & Recreation District	426
8	Entertainment Earth	164
9	Polytainer, Inc.	156
10	Coast to Coast Computer Products	151

== Arts and culture ==
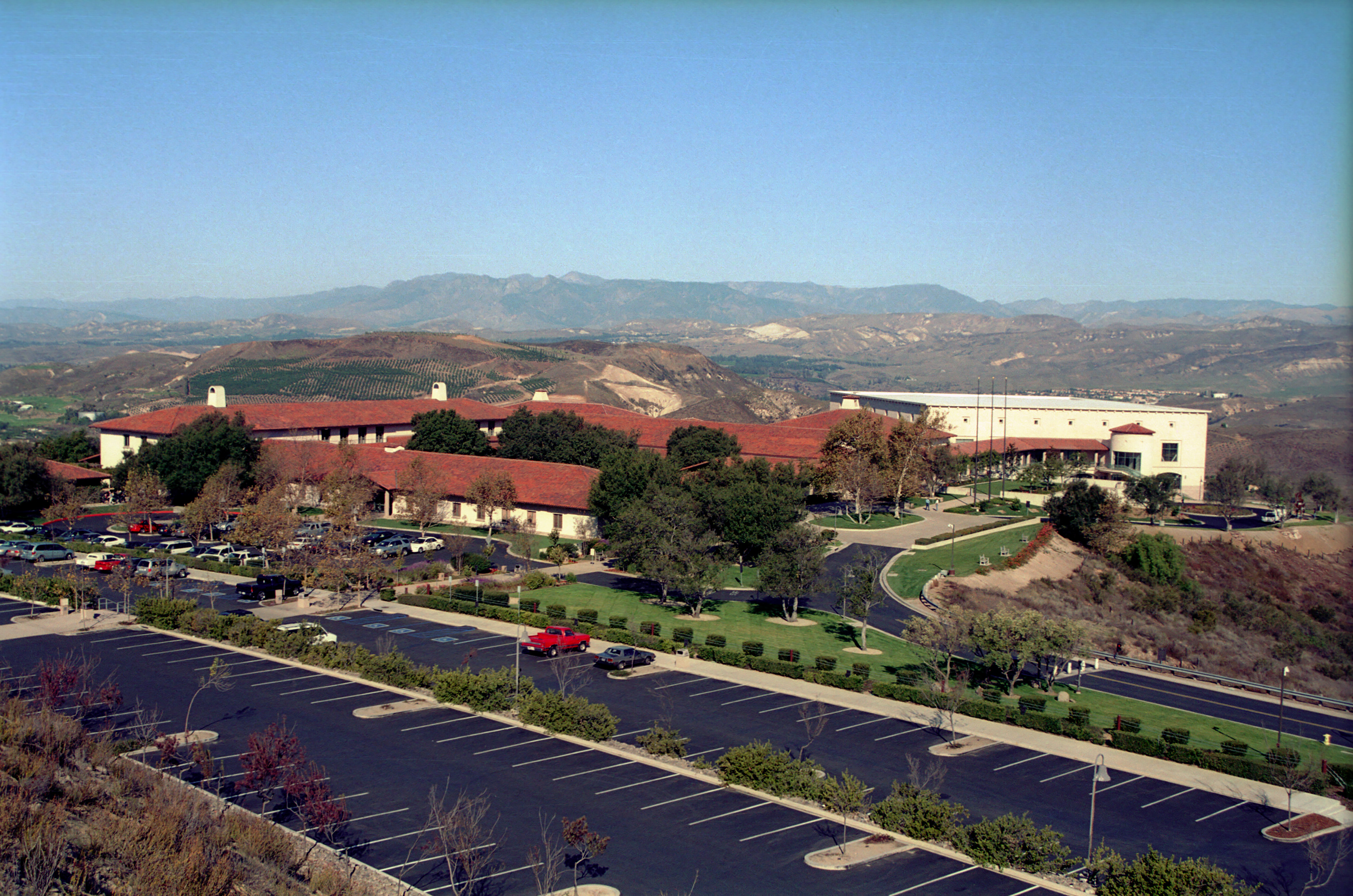
The Ronald Reagan Presidential Library in Simi Valley

The Simi Valley Cultural Arts Center opened in November, 1995 residing in a former neoclassical-style Methodist Church building that was built in 1924.

The Ronald Reagan Presidential Library, located in Simi Valley, was visited by almost 400,000 people in 2014. After the death and state funeral of Ronald Reagan, the former US president was buried at the library in June 2004. The library adjoins a hangar in which the Boeing 707 SAM 27000 (Air Force One), which served presidents Nixon through G.W. Bush, is housed and available for tours. In the pavilion are various automobiles used to transport the president, as well as Marine One, the presidential helicopter.

The Simi Valley Public Library opened in 1916, and moved to its current building on February 24, 1980.

== Parks and recreation ==
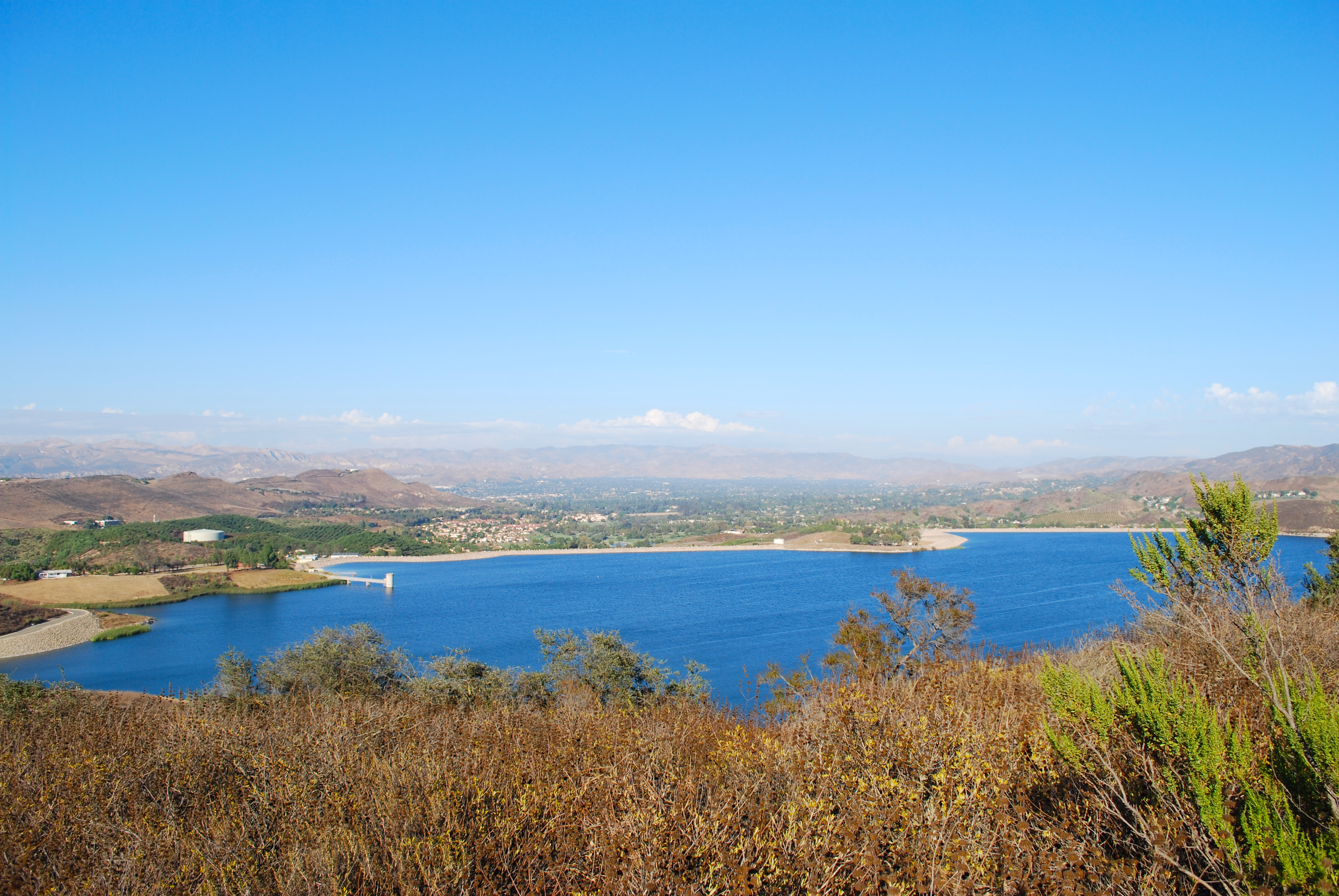
View of Bard Lake from the Sunset Hills Trail

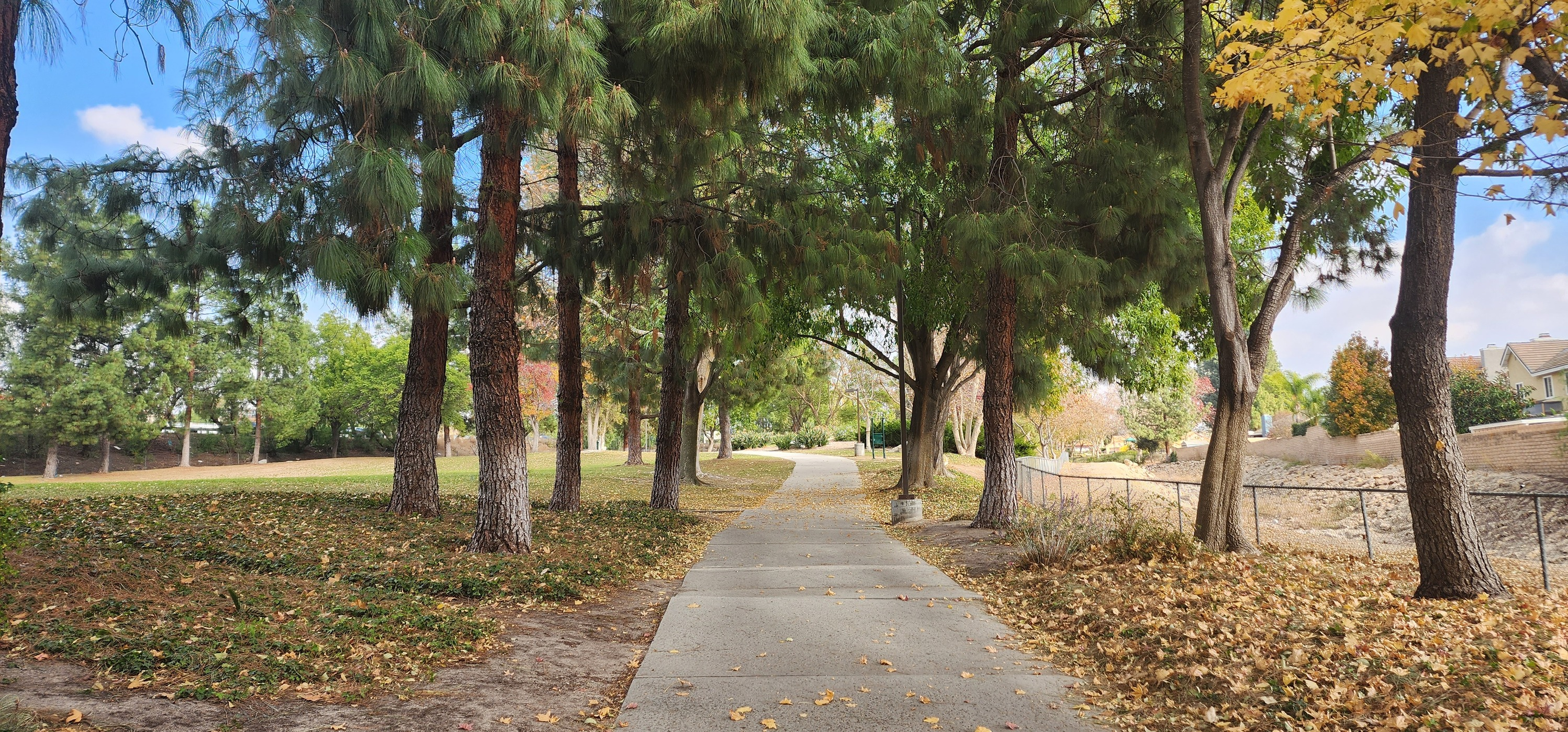
Mayfair Park in Simi Valley in November, 2022

Simi Valley has 5,600 acres (2,300 ha) of public owned land, including hundreds of acres of land in the Simi Hills. Simi Valley has forty-two community parks and one community pool that are open to the public and maintained by the Rancho Simi Recreation and Parks District.

Iceoplex is an ice skating facility and home location of the Cal State Northridge Matadors hockey program.

Notable publicly-owned parks and recreational facilities in Simi Valley include:

- Arroyo Simi Trail
- Challenger Park
- Corriganville Movie Ranch
- Las Llajas Canyon
- Mount McCoy
- Oak Park
- Rocky Peak
- Sage Ranch Park
- Santa Susana Depot
- Simi Peak
- Strathearn Historical Park and Museum
- Tapo Canyon Regional Park
- Tierra Rejada Park

== Government ==
=== Local government ===
Simi Valley's government uses the "council-manager" form of government. This means that the city council is composed of one mayor, elected every two years, and four council members elected for four-year terms. The city council appoints both the city attorney and city manager, who heads the executive branch of the city government. The city manager appoints the various department heads for the city, and acts as the city clerk and city treasurer.

According to the 2008–2009 Comprehensive Annual Financial Report Fund Financial Statements, the city's various funds had $89.3 million in Revenues, $86.3 million in expenditures, $139.9 million in total assets, $26.1 million in total liabilities, and $158.5 million in investments.

=== Politics ===
Simi Valley vote by party in presidential elections
Year	Democratic	Republican	Third parties
2024	46.53% 30,687	50.68% 33,425	2.79% 1,844
2020	49.34% 35,225	48.45% 34,590	2.22% 1,584
2016	43.86% 25,670	47.88% 28,022	8.26% 4,834
2012	42.78% 23,122	54.90% 29,673	2.31% 1,250
2008	46.64% 26,332	51.55% 29,102	1.81% 1,020
2004	38.09% 19,407	60.73% 30,942	1.18% 602
2000	40.59% 18,207	55.57% 24,925	3.85% 1,725
1996	38.32% 14,871	47.11% 18,279	14.57% 5,654
1992	32.21% 13,538	36.95% 15,531	30.85% 12,967
1988	29.97% 10,998	68.62% 25,177	1.41% 517
1984	22.38% 6,998	76.62% 23,957	0.99% 311
1980	22.25% 5,923	68.27% 18,173	9.48% 2,524
1976	42.53% 9,003	55.39% 11,725	2.08% 440
1972	28.08% 6,137	67.15% 14,674	4.76% 1,041

Simi Valley was at one time considered a conservative stronghold politically, along with the neighboring city of Thousand Oaks. Democratic nominee Joe Biden won Simi Valley in the 2020 United States presidential election.

In the state legislature, Simi Valley is in the 27th senatorial district, represented by Democrat Henry Stern, and in the 42nd Assembly district, represented by Democrat Jacqui Irwin.

In the United States House of Representatives, Simi Valley is in California's 26th congressional district, represented by Democrat Julia Brownley. In the United States Senate, California is represented by Alex Padilla and Adam Schiff.

As of the 2024 General Election results, all of Simi Valley's elected representatives are from the Democratic Party.

In November 2018, Katie Hill unseated Republican Steve Knight and became the first Democratic woman to represent the district in the House of Representatives. Additionally, in 2022, Alex Padilla became the first Latino elected to the Senate from California.

== Education ==
Simi Valley is served by the Simi Valley Unified School District.

There are five high schools located in Simi Valley: Royal High School, Grace Brethren High School, Santa Susana High School, Simi Valley High School, and Apollo High School (a continuation school).

There are three middle schools located in Simi Valley: Hillside Middle School, Valley View Middle School, and Sinaloa Middle School.

Schools of higher education in Simi Valley include Eternity Bible College and American Jewish University.

== Infrastructure ==
=== Transportation ===
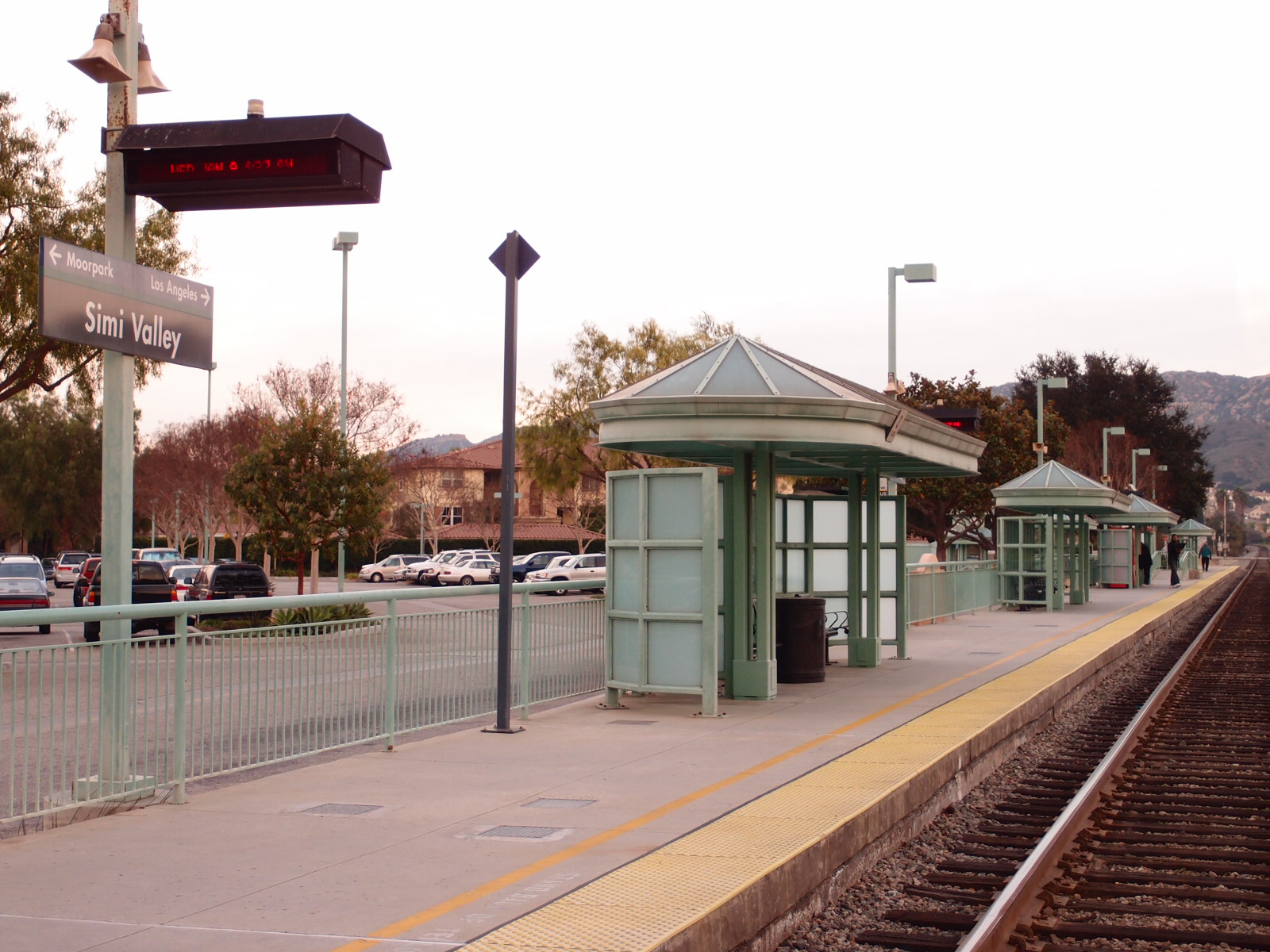
Simi Valley station

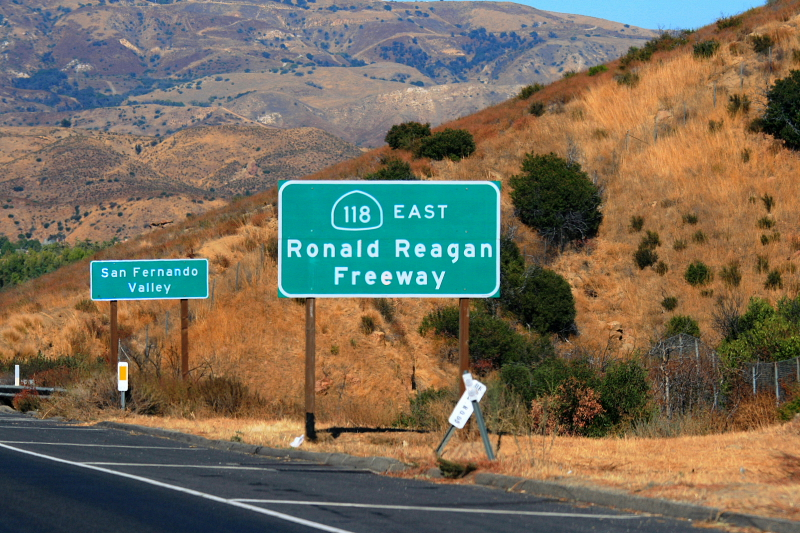
Ronald Reagan Freeway

The Montalvo Cutoff, a railroad line opened by the Southern Pacific Railroad on March 20, 1904, to improve the alignment of its Coast Line, runs east–west through the valley. In 1905, the longest train tunnel in the United States at that time was completed at the east end of Simi Valley. Tunnel #26 is still being used linking Simi Valley and the San Fernando Valley through the Santa Susana Mountains. The area was originally served by the Santa Susana Depot which was also opened in 1904 as a combination passenger and freight depot built by the Southern Pacific and located on Los Angeles Avenue near Tapo Street. The station remained in use for the 60 years.

Simi Valley station is used by Amtrak and Metrolink on the railroad's Ventura County Line, and by Simi Valley Transit.

=== Public safety ===
Law enforcement is provided by the Simi Valley Police Department, and the Ventura County Fire Department provides fire protection. American Medical Response, in conjunction with Ventura County Fire Department, provide emergency medical services at the Advanced Life Support level.

== Notable people ==
- Dallas Braden, Major League Baseball player
- Mike Mo Capaldi, professional skateboarder, entrepreneur
- Francis Chan, pastor, author, speaker
- Jim Cherry, musician, singer, songwriter
- Jason Dolley, actor
- Aron Eisenberg, actor and filmmaker
- Jenna Leigh Green (born Jennifer Greenberg), actress
- Heather Halley, actress
- Hunter King, actress
- Joey King, actress
- Don MacLean, UCLA and National Basketball Association player
- Matt Magill, Major League Baseball player
- Merrell Twins, YouTubers, actresses and musicians
- Ray Navarro (1964–1990), artist, filmmaker, and HIV/AIDS activist
- Ben Orloff, Major League Baseball player
- Torey Pudwill, professional skateboarder, entrepreneur
- Scott Radinsky, Major League Baseball player, coach, and singer
- Scott Rice, Major League Baseball player
- Danielle Savre, actress and singer
- Robert Smith, professional bowler
- Jeff Weaver, Major League Baseball player
- Jered Weaver, Major League Baseball player
- Matthew Wolff, professional golfer
- Shailene Woodley, actress

== In popular culture ==
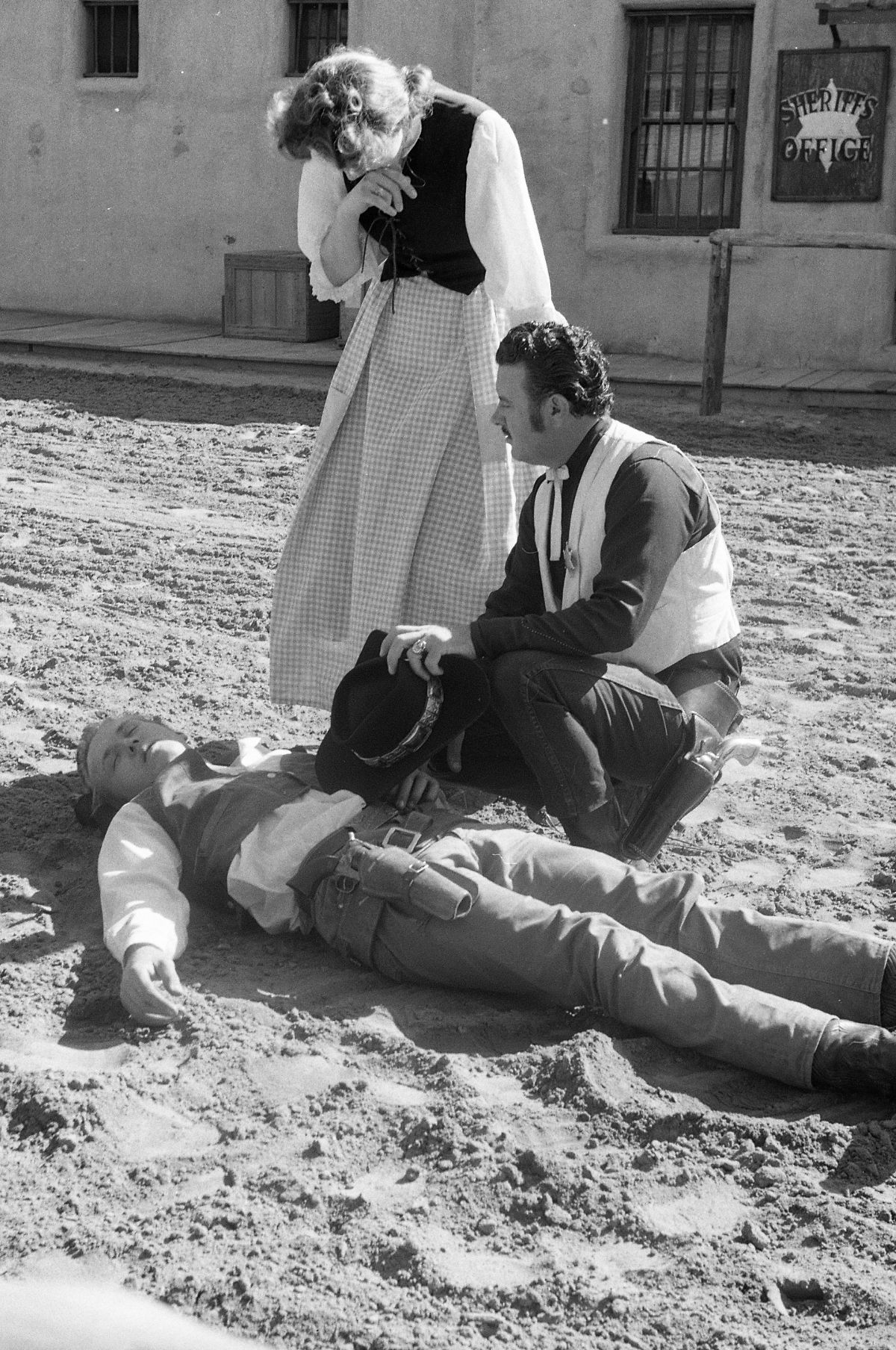
Actors in a death scene at Corriganville Movie Ranch in 1963

Due to lying within the 30-mile zone, Simi Valley has long been a popular entertainment industry location.

- Simi Valley and the surrounding hills have been the site of several television shows, including the long-running series Gunsmoke and M*A*S*H.
- Established in 1937 and opened to the public in 1949, the Corriganville Movie Ranch, established by Ray "Crash" Corrigan, is located at the extreme Eastern end of Simi Valley and was the production site for many movies and television shows. Today the site is open to the public as Corriganville Park, just off the Santa Susana Pass Road.
- The popular 1970s television show Little House on the Prairie utilized an expansive collection of sets constructed throughout the hilly landscapes of Big Sky Ranch in the Tapo Canyon hills north of Simi Valley and Santa Clarita, California. In addition to the Little House itself, the entire set for the town of Walnut Grove was built atop the hills. After finishing his work on the series, Michael Landon blew up the town (which became part of the final movie) but the Little House itself was left intact. In July 2004, the house was destroyed by a devastating California wildfire.
- The 1973 film The Doberman Gang was filmed entirely in Simi Valley, with the actual Bank of A. Levy as the backdrop for the robbery scenes.
- In 1983, Colleen McCullough's TV mini-series The Thorn Birds was brought to life in a remote corner of the Simi Valley. Australia presented too many hurdles for producers, the least of which was the restriction that only two American actors star in any movie filmed there; the rest had to be Australian. Location scouts went scouring, and Simi Valley, some of which strongly resembles parts of the Australian countryside, was chosen for the famous Cleary ranch and sheep station, Drogheda.
- In the 1984 film Bachelor Party starring Tom Hanks, the MANN 6 Movie Theater, formerly located within the Sycamore Shopping Center, was used for the movie theater scene.
- The 1986 western comedy film Three Amigos was partially filmed here.
- The Brandeis-Bardin Institute's House of the Book is the location of the original Power Ranger Power Chamber.
- The 1982 hit horror film Poltergeist was filmed on Roxbury Street in Simi Valley. At the time, the homes were new and the land behind the street was free, allowing plenty of access for studio trucks. 4267 Roxbury Street (the Freeling house in the film) suffered substantial earthquake damage in the 1994 Northridge earthquake.
- For the 1992 movie Sneakers with Robert Redford, the Gibraltar Savings building (later Countrywide at 400 Countrywide Way) was transformed to The Playtronics Toy company. The entire front lobby and hallways were redone for the movie and then returned to their original design. Some of the filmings were done from hills across from the building. Many scenes were shot at night with the permission of the residents, due to the lighting required.
- The delivery of the ransom money in The Big Lebowski shows a highway sign naming Simi Valley.
- The video for "Bullet with Butterfly Wings" by The Smashing Pumpkins was filmed in Simi Valley.
- In the 1995 film Species, the character, Dr. Laura Baker, is said to be from Simi Valley.
- In the 2001 comedy Joe Dirt, the character found his long-lost parents in a trailer home park in Simi Valley (On another version of the movie, it was changed to Yucca Valley, California).
- The 1992 children's comedy Honey, I Blew Up the Kid was filmed in and around 676 Coldbrook Pl.
- In the 1992 film Forever Young starring Mel Gibson the test airstrip scenes and the highway chase scene were filmed on the west end of Simi Valley bordering Moorpark.
- Most of the 2003 film adaptation of The Cat in the Hat, starring Mike Myers and Dakota Fanning, was filmed in Simi Valley. The elaborate faux suburb where most of the film takes place was built on vacant land in a hilly area in West Simi Valley.
- Parts of Viva Rock Vegas, the sequel to the original Flintstones movie, was filmed at Rocky Peak.
- The video for "Hexagram," by Deftones, was filmed with fans watching the band play the song in an indoor skatepark in Simi Valley.
- The 2003 video game Black & Bruised has a character, Jumping Janet, whose hometown is Simi Valley.
- The skatepark in the 2005 movie Bad News Bears is in Simi Valley.
- In 2005, the PBS children's television series Postcards from Buster featured skateboard culture; interviewing local children and visiting the indoor skateboard park, Skatelab.
- The "Retail Rodeo" scenes from the Jennifer Aniston movie The Good Girl were filmed in the Ralph's shopping center on L.A. Ave. The set was constructed inside a vacant retail space.
- Nu-metal band Limp Bizkit filmed the music video for the single "Break Stuff" at Skatelab, a skate park in Simi Valley.
- The 2006 comedy The Benchwarmers was filmed on location in Knolls Park and Santa Susana Park, both located in Simi Valley.
- In March 2008, G.I. Joe: The Rise of Cobra started filming in the northern hills above Simi Valley, near the Little House on the Prairie site.
- The Patrick Swayze movie Three Wishes used a baseball field in Simi Valley, near the Santa Susana Pass.
- In 2009, the rock band AFI filmed their music video for "Beautiful Thieves", the second single from their album Crash Love, in a mansion in Simi Valley.
- The 2009 Hallmark Channel movie Always and Forever was filmed in various locations throughout Simi Valley and Moorpark, California.
- In 2009 Gavin Rossdale filmed part of his music video "Forever May You Run" in an office building on 555 E. Easy Street in Simi Valley.
- The fictional "Atmospheric Research Institute" from the 2009 NBC TV miniseries The Storm was filmed in an office building on 555 E. Easy Street in Simi Valley.
- 1000 Ways to Die uses the fictional "Simi Valley U" for most college-related clips like "Washed and Fried", "Beer Bashed", and "Who Fart-Dead"
- G4's American Ninja Warrior competitions hold their "boot camp" in the mountains of Simi Valley.
- In 2011, WWE Tough Enough chose Hummingbird Ranch, located at the north-end of Kuehner Drive in Simi Valley.
- In 2013, Bunim/Murray Productions used one of the two Simi Valley mansions to film a spin-off for The Bad Girls Club.
- Scenes in Criminal Minds were filmed in various places in Simi Valley, Including an intersection on Cochran St.
- The 2016 film Miss Stevens, starring actors such as Timotheé Chalamet and Lily Rabe, was filmed throughout the city, with specific locations such as The Grand Vista Hotel, Beeps Diner and the Mobil Gas Station off of Kuehner Drive.
- In an October 2018 episode of podcast Comedy Bang Bang, Thomas Middleditch plays character Brody Broderson, who hails from the city.
- Jimmy Tatro's popular YouTube and Facebook television series The Real Bros of Simi Valley takes place in and around the city.
- In 2019, scenes from Once Upon a Time in Hollywood was filmed in Corriganville Movie Ranch.
- In June 2020, the Judge Cuts phase of America's Got Talent Season 15 were filmed at a currently-undisclosed outdoor venue in the city to comply with the COVID-2019 social restrictions; notably social distancing.
- In March 2021, Justin Bieber - Holy (Official Live Performance) was filmed at Corriganville Movie Ranch.
- In May 2021, The Weeknd - Save Your Tears (Live at The BRIT Awards 2021) was filmed at Corriganville Movie Ranch.
- The main village featured in the series Father Murphy was located at Big Sky Movie Ranch.
- The 2022 film Everything Everywhere All at Once is set in Simi Valley, with multiple scenes filmed in the city.

== See also ==
- Santa Susana, CA
- History of California before 1900
- List of Registered Historic Places in Ventura County, California
- Rodney King - a trial of officers accused of beating King was held here
