= Simi Adobe–Strathearn House =

Historic house in California, United States

- U.S. National Register of Historic Places
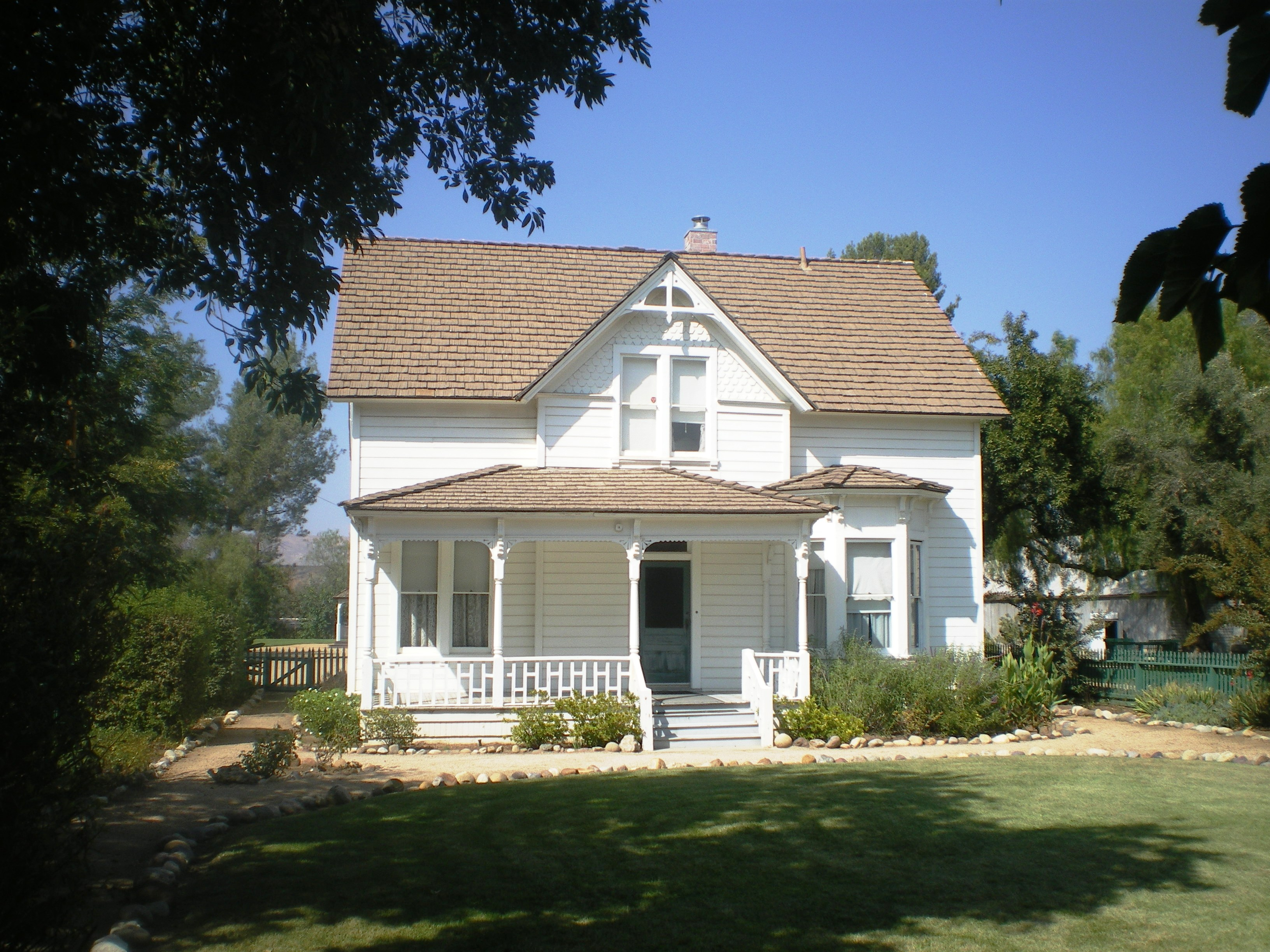
- Strathearn House, September 2008
- Location: Simi Valley, California
- Coordinates: 34°16′28.03″N 118°48′3.61″W
- Built: 1893
- Architectural style: Late Victorian
- NRHP reference No.: 78000825
- Added to NRHP: May 19, 1978

The historic Simi Adobe–Strathearn House served as the headquarters of Rancho Simi, also known as Rancho San José de Nuestra Senora de Altagracia y Simi, one of the land grants in Alta California by the Spanish government. The name derives from Shimiji, the name of the Chumash village here before the Spanish. Rancho Simi was the earliest Spanish colonial land grant within Ventura and Santa Barbara Counties. At 113,000 acres, Rancho Simi was one of the state's largest land grants.

The headquarters of the rancho served as the home of Robert P. Strathearn (and is thus known as the Strathearn House), built in 1892–93. The home remained in the Strathearn family until 1969, when the dwelling and 5.85 acres (2.37 ha) of surrounding land were donated to the Simi Valley Recreation and Park District. Two rooms of the original adobe remain as part of the Strathearn House, now located in Robert P. Strathearn Historical Park in Simi Valley, California. Rancho Simi has been designated a California Historical Landmark (#979) and is listed on the National Register of Historic Places.

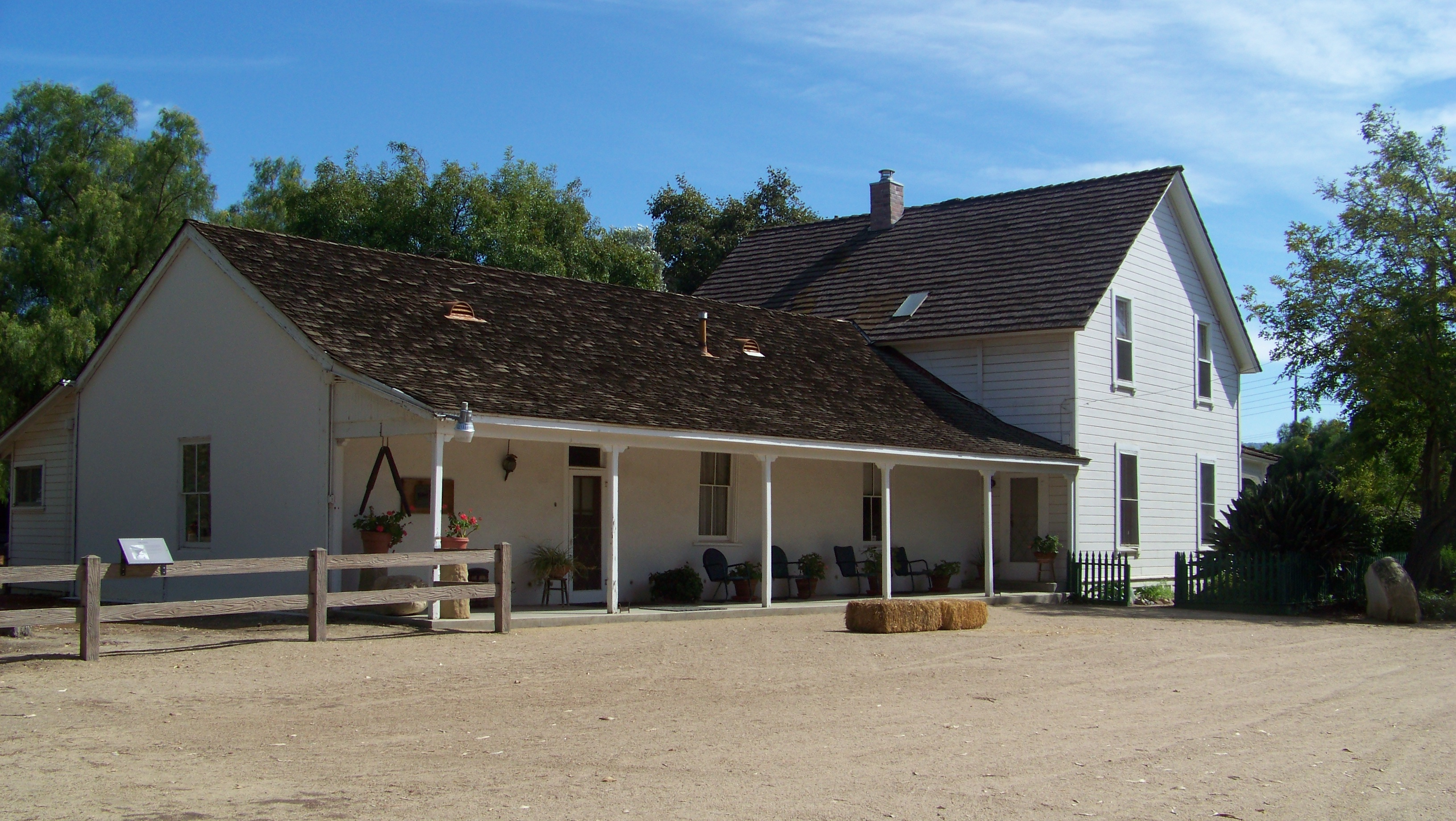
The Simi adobe house

== Strathearn Historical Park and Museum ==
The Simi Adobe–Strathearn House is part of the Strathearn Historical Park and Museum, an open air park that is owned and maintained by the Rancho Simi Recreation and Park District, and is operated jointly with the Simi Valley Historical Society. The house is maintained as a historic house museum with typical period furniture and household displays.

The park's Visitor Center features changing exhibits about Simi Valley, and is the start for docent-led park tours. The interior of buildings can only be viewed during the docent-led tours. In addition to the Simi Adobe–Strathearn House, there are various historic buildings and structures that have been moved from their original site to the park, including the 1924 Montgomery children's playhouse, the 1902 St. Rose of Lima Catholic Church, the original Simi Valley Library, a Colony House built in 1888, the Banaga Barber Shop, the Currier pitting shed, and two barns with farm tools and equipment.

The site is home to the Simi Valley Historical Society which seeks to acquire, preserve, maintain, identify and mark historical buildings, sites and landmarks; to collect artifacts of historical significance; to provide and maintain a sanctuary for such artifacts; to provide for the public a reservoir of historical information; to encourage and continue research in the history of the area.

== See also ==
- List of Registered Historic Places in Ventura County, California
- Ventura County Historic Landmarks & Points of Interest
