= Rancho Simi =

Spanish land grant in Los Angeles and Ventura Counties, California

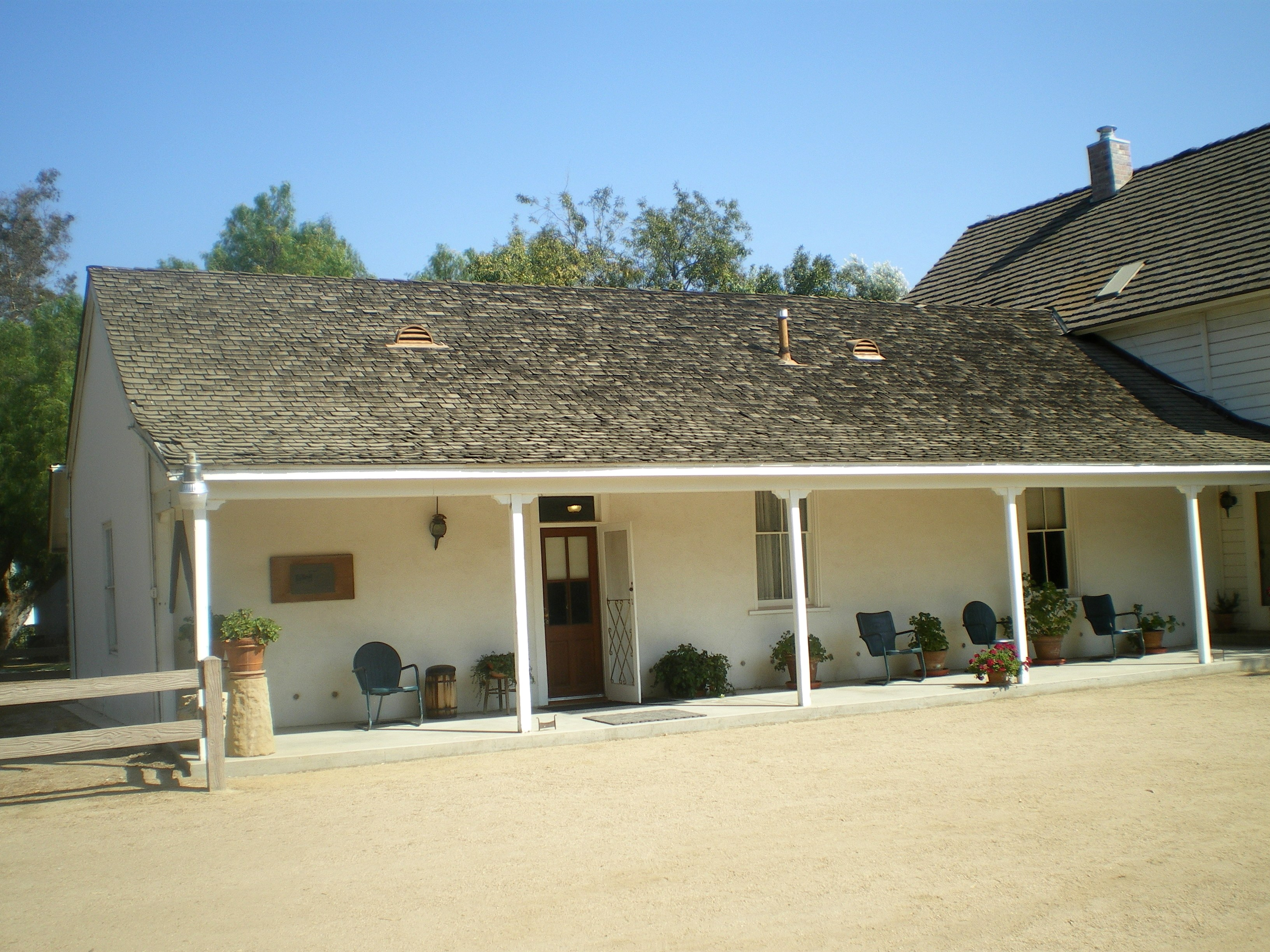
- Interactive map of Rancho Simi
- 34°16′48″N 118°52′12″W
- Location: 137 Strathearn Place, Simi Valley, California

California Historical Landmark
- Official name: Rancho Simi
- Reference no.: 979

Rancho Simi, also known as Rancho San José de Nuestra Señora de Altagracia y Simí, was a 113,009-acre (457 km^{2}) Spanish land grant in what is now eastern Ventura and western Los Angeles counties granted in 1795 to Santiago Pico, founder of the Pico family of California. After Santiago Pico's death in 1815, the Rancho was regranted to Santiago's sons Javier Pico and his two brothers, Patricio Pico and Miguel Pico by Diego de Borica. The name derives from Shimiji, the name of a Chumash village in the Simi Valley for thousands of years before the Spanish arrival.

== History ==
Rancho Simi was a Spanish land concession in Alta California given in 1795 to Santiago Pico. After Santiago Pico's death in 1815, the Rancho was regranted to Santiago's sons Javier Pico and his two brothers, Patricio Pico and Miguel Pico by the Spanish government.

José de la Guerra y Noriega, a Captain of the Santa Barbara Presidio, who had begun to acquire large amounts of land in California to raise cattle, purchased Rancho Simi from the Pico family in 1842. The grant was confirmed in 1842 by Mexican Governor Juan Alvarado. With the cession of California to the United States following the Mexican–American War, the 1848 Treaty of Guadalupe Hidalgo provided that the land grants would be honored. As required by the Land Act of 1851, a claim for Rancho Simi was filed with the Public Land Commission in 1852, and the grant was patented to José de la Guerra y Noriega in 1865 (patent No. 400).

José de la Guerra y Noriega's death in 1858, his sons continued to operate the ranchos. The end of their prosperity came when several years of drought in the 1860s caused heavy losses.

In 1865, the De la Guerras lost the ownership of El Rancho Simí excluding the portion that came to be known as Rancho Tapo*. Rancho SImi (excluding Rancho Tapo) was sold to the Philadelphia and California Petroleum Company headed by Pennsylvania Railroad president, Thomas A. Scott. When no great amount of oil was discovered, Scott began to sell the rancho. In 1887, that portion of the rancho was bought by a newly formed company, the Simi Land and Water Company.

The city of Simi Valley, California incorporated in 1969.

*El Rancho Tapo was part of the original 113,009 acre Rancho Simí grant, but sometime around 1820-1830, the Rancho Tapo came to be thought of as a separate place within Rancho Simí. The last of the De la Guerras to live in Simí Valley retreated to a 14,400-acre portion of the original rancho that was known as the Tapo Rancho. As late as February 1877, Juan De la Guerra was reported in county newspapers to be preparing to plant walnuts in the Tapo, which appears to be the final mention of their farming in relation to the original Simí grant. The De la Guerra heirs tried every legal means, but by the 1880s, the Rancho Tapo also slipped from their ownership, as had the rest of the Rancho.

== Historic sites of the Rancho ==
- Simi Adobe–Strathearn House – home of Robert P. Strathearn served as the rancho headquarters. It is now part of the Strathearn Historical Park and Museum.

== See also ==
- Ranchos of California
- List of Ranchos of California
- Simi Valley, CA
