= Mission Point (California) =

Mountain in United States of America

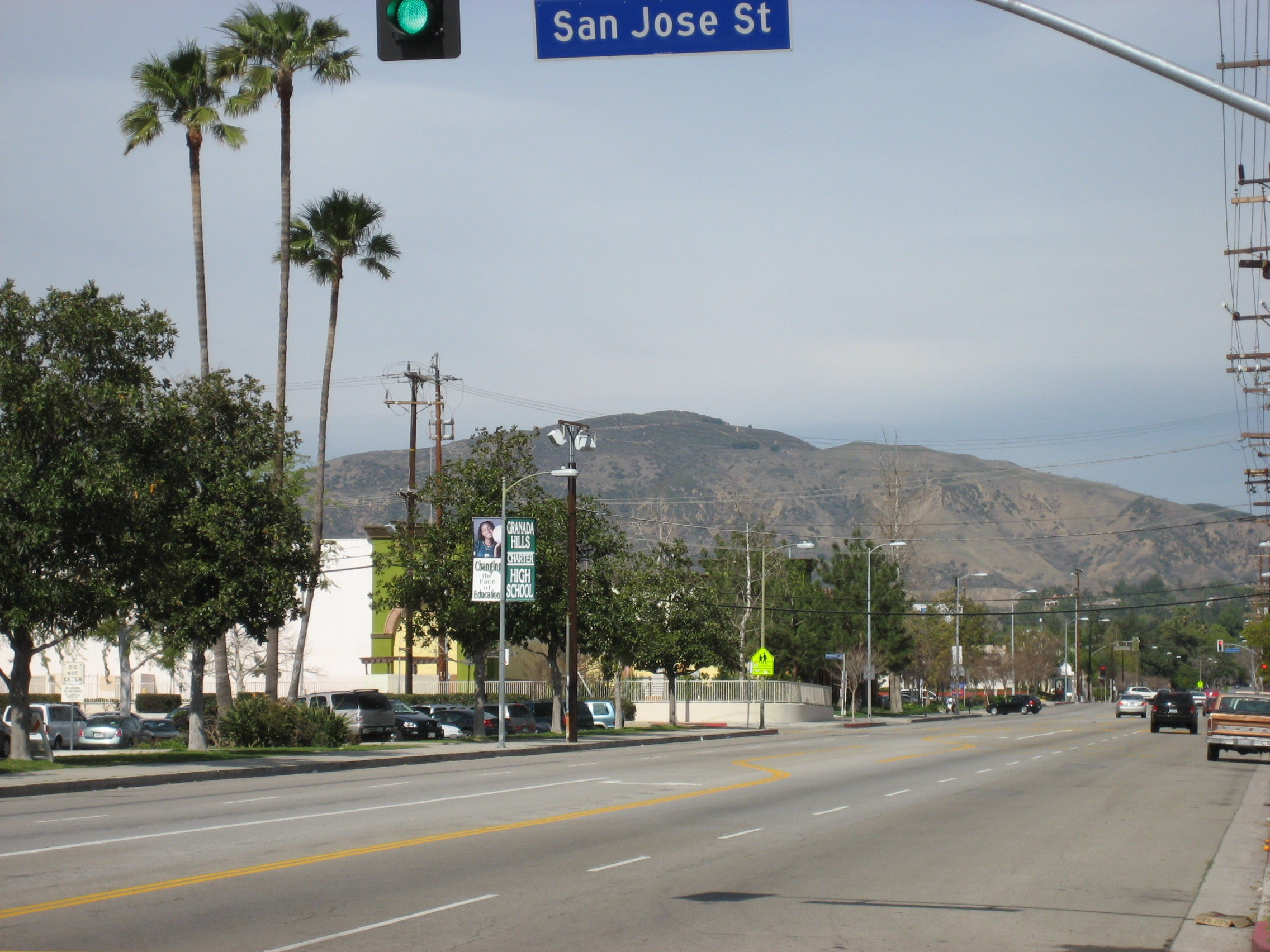
- Mission Point, from Zelzah Ave. and San Jose St.

Highest point
- Elevation: 2,771 ft (845 m) NAVD 88
- Prominence: 184 ft (56 m)
- Coordinates: 34°18′42″N 118°32′02″W

Geography
- Location within California Location within the United States
- Location: Los Angeles County, California, U.S.
- Parent range: Santa Susana Mountains
- Topo map: USGS Oat Mountain

Climbing
- Easiest route: Trail

Mission Point, better known as "Mission Peak" to locals, is a spur of Oat Mountain in Los Angeles County, Southern California. At 2,771 feet (845 m) high, it is the second highest peak of the Santa Susana Mountains after Oat Mountain.

== Geography ==
Mission Point is located in the eastern edge of the Santa Susana Mountains. Newhall Pass lies to the east, separating the Santa Susana and San Gabriel mountain ranges. Mission Point is located above Aliso Canyon, north of California State Route 118 (Ronald Reagan freeway) between Porter Ranch and Granada Hills in the San Fernando Valley.

== Recreation ==
Mountain hiking and mountain biking are popular in this area. The view from the top of Mission Point is striking, taking in most of the San Fernando Valley. In clear weather, one can see the Pacific Ocean and Downtown Los Angeles. Once at the top, there is a monument dedicated to Mario A. DeCampos M.D. (5/26/1924–2/17/1984) with the inscription:

"Share this peaceful retreat and enjoy the beauty.—Mario's Friends 5/26/1984"

There are at least two trails up to Mission Point. One begins at the end (the farthest from the entrance) of O'Melveny Park. Continue until you reach a split and take the trail going up. The other trailhead is at the end of Neon Way, a residential street. Watch for a pond (with live goldfish) to the east of the trail near the beginning (bottom). From that trailhead, you will see a gas line that also goes up to Mission Point. For those eager for a challenge, it is possible to go directly up in parallel with the gas line.

=== Trail closure ===
As of October 2007, the Southern California Gas Company has gated off areas near the top of Mission Point, although it is still accessible via a newly cut trail. The area northeast of Mission Point is part of the 500-acre Michael D. Antonovich Open Space Preserve which was dedicated August 12, 2002.

== See also ==
- Sand Rock Peak
- Rocky Peak
- Mount Wilson
- Chatsworth Peak
