= Rocky Peak =

Mountain in southern California, United States

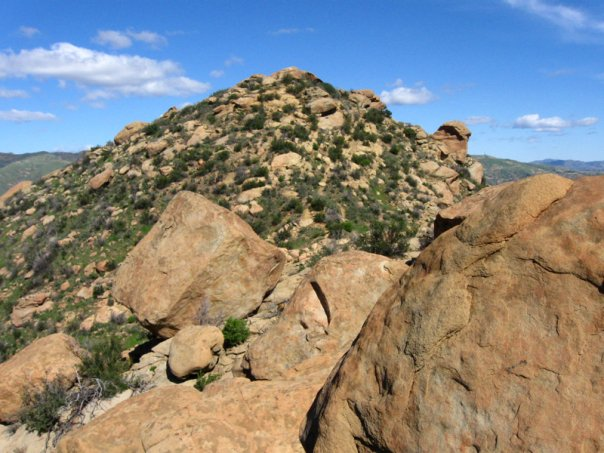

Highest point
- Elevation: 2,715 ft (828 m) NAVD 88
- Listing: Lower Peaks Committee List
- Coordinates: 34°17′31″N 118°38′12″W

Geography
- Location within California Location within the United States
- Location: Los Angeles County / Ventura County, California, U.S.
- Parent range: Santa Susana Mountains
- Topo map: USGS Simi Valley East

Climbing
- Easiest route: Road hike

Rocky Peak, located in Rocky Peak Park, is the fourth-highest point in the Santa Susana Mountains, and overlooks the San Fernando Valley and Chatsworth, the Simi Hills, and the Simi Valley in Southern California. The peak, which is 2,715 feet (828 m) in elevation, sits on the Los Angeles County–Ventura County line.

== Geography ==
Rocky Peak also marks the point where the county line changes direction from true north to a more northwesterly direction. A large railroad spike driven into the rocks mark this exact spot on the county line. Rocky Peak, which gets its name from the many large craggy boulders that dot its surface, can be viewed from several locations along Topanga Canyon Blvd., and from California State Route 118, also known as the Ronald Reagan Freeway.

The nearest neighbor is Oat Mountain, the highest mountain in the Santa Susana Mountains range, which lies east of Rocky Peak.

== History ==
The area was part of the homeland and trading crossroads of the Tataviam, Tongva, and Chumash people for eight thousand years. The Chumash Burro Flats Painted Cave is just to the west in the Simi Hills on the Santa Susana Field Laboratory property.

Historic Santa Susana Pass is at the foot of the mountain, with the Old Santa Susana Stage Road located in the Santa Susana Pass State Historic Park nearby. Rocky Peak has been prominently featured in many classic Hollywood films, being next to three major Movie ranches; the Iverson, Spahn, and Corriganville Ranches; and its evocative 'Old-West Frontier' landscape scenery.

== Rocky Peak Park ==
Rocky Peak Park is located about 0.7 miles (1.1 km) northwest of the peak includes the Runkle Ranch, formerly owned by entertainer Bob Hope. The park reaches five miles (8 km) northward from Simi Freeway to Las Llajas Canyon. a 4,800 acres (19 km^{2}) regional open space preserve, includes the 4,400-acre (18 km^{2}) Rocky Peak Park forms the most critical wildlife habitat linkage between the Santa Susana Mountains and the Simi Hills and on to the Santa Susana Mountains. The highest elevation in the park is 2' higher than Rocky Peak, at 2717'.

There are miles of trails, including the Rim of the Valley Trail Corridor, in Rocky Peak Park with panoramic views that are popular for hiking, mountain biking, and equestrian rides. They connect with other preserves to the northeast in the Santa Susanas. Sage Ranch Park is to the west with trails and camping. The Santa Susana Pass State Historic Park and trail system is just to the south across the highway.

== See also ==
- Sand Rock Peak
- Chatsworth Peak
- Simi Peak
- Oat Mountain
- Santa Susana Mountains topics index
