= Bill Schultz (American football) =

American football player (born 1967)

No. 74, 71, 67
- Position: Guard

Personal information
- Born: May 1, 1967 (age 59); Granada Hills, California, U.S.
- Listed height: 6 ft 5 in (1.96 m)
- Listed weight: 305 lb (138 kg)

Career information
- High school: John F. Kennedy (Los Angeles, California)
- College: Glendale CC (1985–1986); USC (1987–1989)
- NFL draft: 1990: 4th round, 94th overall pick

Career history
- Indianapolis Colts (1990–1993); Los Angeles Rams (1994)*; Houston Oilers (1994); Denver Broncos (1995); Scottish Claymores (1997); Chicago Bears (1997)
- * Offseason or practice squad member only

Career NFL statistics
- Games played: 56
- Games started: 28
- Fumble recoveries: 2
- Receptions: 1
- Receiving yards: 3
- Touchdowns: 1
- Stats at Pro Football Reference

William N. Schultz (born May 1, 1967) is an American former professional football player who was an offensive lineman in the National Football League (NFL). He played college football for the USC Trojans.

== Early life ==
Schultz prepped at Kennedy High School in Granada Hills.

== College career ==
Schultz played his first two years for Glendale Community College (California). Schultz was a fourth-round draft choice from the University of Southern California in the 1990 NFL draft.

== Professional career ==
Schultz played for the Indianapolis Colts (1990–1993), the Houston Oilers (1994) for the Denver Broncos (1995) and for the Chicago Bears (1997).
