= Granada Hills, Los Angeles =

Granada Hills
- Neighborhood of Los Angeles
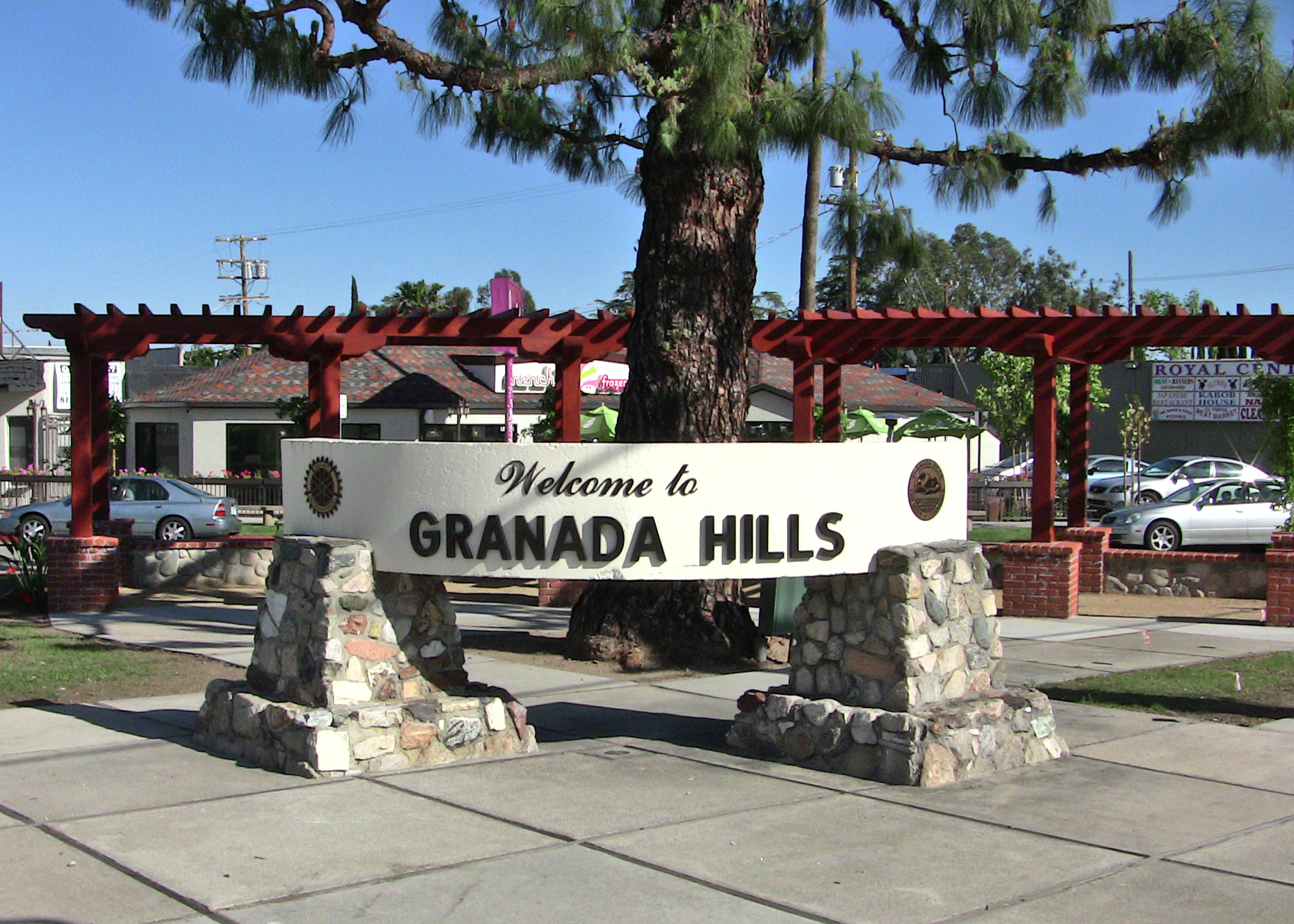
- A welcome sign at Chatsworth Street and Zelzah Avenue
- Motto: "The Valley's Most Neighborly Town"
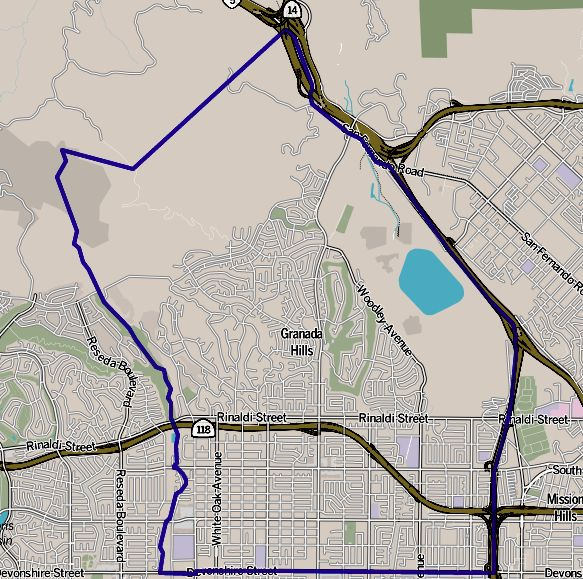
- Boundaries of Granada Hills as drawn by the Los Angeles Times

- Location within Los Angeles/San Fernando Valley Granada Hills (the Los Angeles metropolitan area)
- Coordinates: 34°17′N 118°30′W
- Named for: Spanish for "pomegranate"

Area
  - Total: 15.11 sq mi (39.1 km^{2})
- Elevation: 958 ft (292 m)

Population (2008)
  - Total: 53,998
  - Density: 3,574/sq mi (1,380/km^{2})
- Time zone: UTC−8 (PST)
  - Summer (DST): UTC−7 (PDT)
- Area code: 818

Granada Hills is a neighborhood in the San Fernando Valley region of Los Angeles. The community has a sports program and a range of city recreation centers. The neighborhood has fourteen public and ten private schools.

== History ==
The Granada Hills area is situated on the traditional homelands of the Tongva and Chumash. The Tongva village of Ceegenga may have been the closest village located to the Granada Hills area.

The community began as a dairy farm and orchard known as the Sunshine Ranch which grew apricots, oranges, walnuts and beans. Vestiges of former citrus groves can still be seen in orange, lemon or grapefruit trees in many residential yards. In 1876, the San Fernando Valley's first oil well was drilled in what at northern tip of what is now Zelzah Avenue. Granada Hills was founded in 1926 as "Granada"; the "Hills" portion of the name was added 15 years later.

== Geography and climate ==
Granada Hills is located at the foothills of the Santa Susana Mountains, north of North Hills, Northridge, west of Mission Hills and Sylmar, and east of the Porter Ranch neighborhoods of Los Angeles. The Ronald Reagan Freeway (California State Route 118) runs through its southern area. Van Norman Reservoir, the southern terminus of the Los Angeles Aqueduct, is located in Granada Hills.

Climate data for Granada Hills, Los Angeles
Month	Jan	Feb	Mar	Apr	May	Jun	Jul	Aug	Sep	Oct	Nov	Dec	Year
Mean daily maximum °F (°C)	66 (19)	68 (20)	70 (21)	75 (24)	78 (26)	85 (29)	92 (33)	93 (34)	88 (31)	81 (27)	72 (22)	66 (19)	78 (26)
Mean daily minimum °F (°C)	43 (6)	44 (7)	45 (7)	47 (8)	51 (11)	55 (13)	58 (14)	60 (16)	57 (14)	52 (11)	46 (8)	43 (6)	50 (10)
Average precipitation inches (mm)	4.14 (105)	4.39 (112)	3.81 (97)	0.90 (23)	0.22 (5.6)	0.06 (1.5)	0.02 (0.51)	0.15 (3.8)	0.35 (8.9)	0.51 (13)	1.52 (39)	2.24 (57)	18.31 (465)

== Demographics ==
The 2000 U.S. census counted 50,535 residents in the 15.11-square-mile neighborhood—or 3,344 people per square mile. In 2008, the city estimated that the population had increased to 53,998, a density of 3,574 people per square mile. In 2000 the median age for residents was 37.

The neighborhood is ethnically diverse and includes whites, 55.5%; Latinos, 20.6%; Asians, 16.3%; blacks, 3.4%; and others, 4.2%. Korea (16.0%) and Mexico (13.8%) were the most common places of birth for 29.2% of the residents who were born abroad.

The median yearly household income in 2008 was $83,911. Renters occupied 26.4% of the housing stock. The average household size of 2.9 people was considered average for Los Angeles. The percentages of married men (60.4%) and women (58.5%) were among the county's highest. There were 4,032 veterans, or 10.5% of the population, a high proportion compared to the rest of the city.

== Arts and culture ==
=== Architecture ===
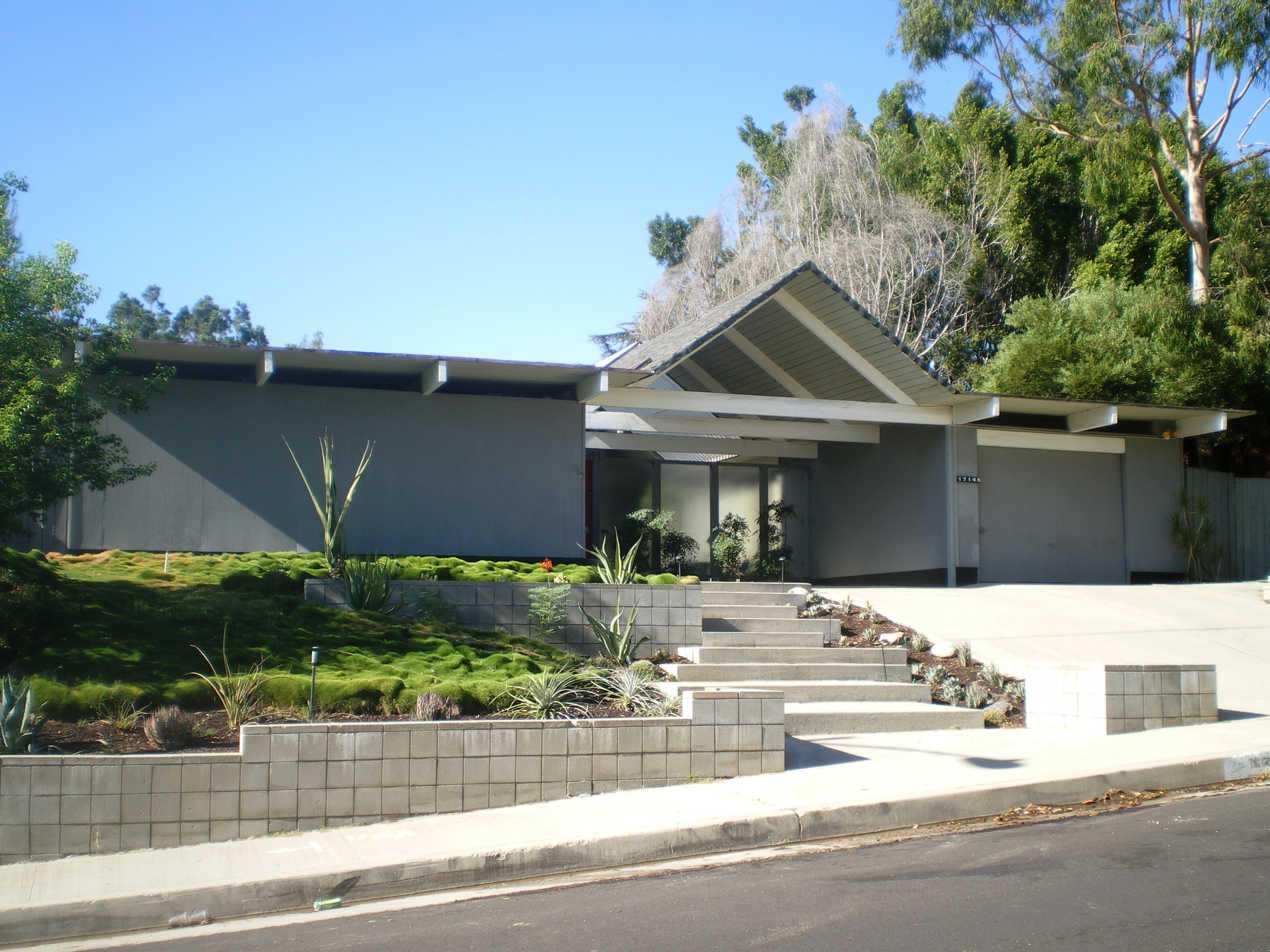
One of the Eichler Homes

Granada Hills is composed mostly of Mid-century modern architecture. Of note is the "Balboa Highlands" tract built by iconic developer Joseph Eichler as well as the Knollwood Country Club area and Knollwood Grove tract. Many of these homes, which are North of Rinaldi/West of Balboa, have been featured in movies, commercials, magazine pictorials and appear in books about Eichler or mid-century architecture.

=== Historical landmarks ===
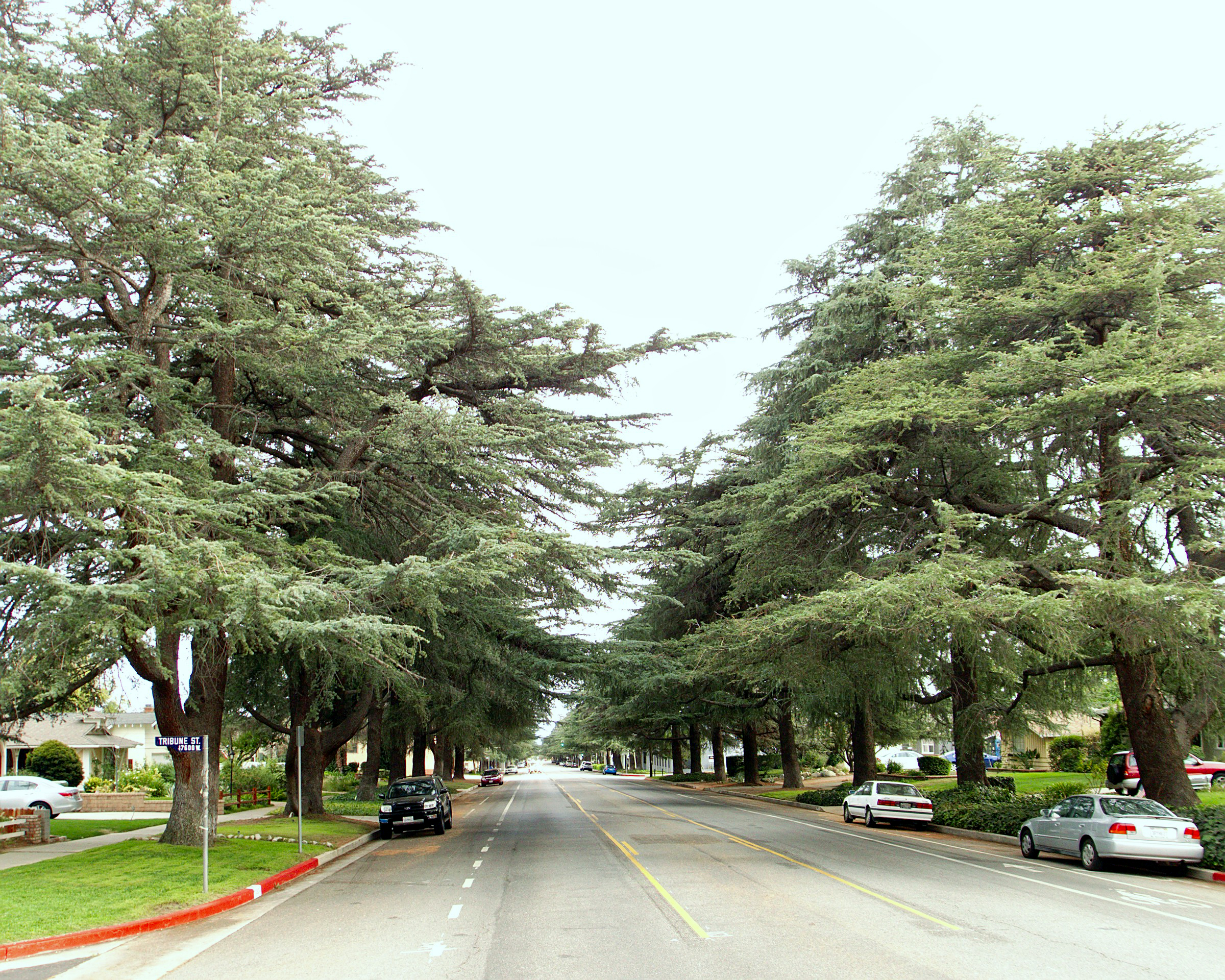
Deodar trees on White Oak Ave.

White Oak Avenue, between San Fernando Mission and San Jose Street, was declared a Los Angeles Historic-Cultural Monument on August 3, 1966, for the 101 Deodar Cedar trees that line the street. The trees are native to the Himalayas and appreciated for their size, beauty and timber. White Oak Avenue trees were used as the back-drop in the flying bicycle scenes in the 1982 film E.T. the Extra-Terrestrial.

== Sports ==
Granada Hills Charter High School's stadium, the John Elway Stadium (named after the quarterback, an alumnus), is home to the Los Angeles Rampage women's soccer team and formerly home to the San Fernando Valley Quakes.

In 1963, the Granada Hills Little League won the Little League World Championship in baseball.

== Parks and recreation ==
O'Melveny Park, the second largest park in Los Angeles, consists of a large undeveloped area and a much smaller developed section with several dozen citrus trees, a small intermittent stream, and grass and picnic areas. This 672-acre (2.72 km^{2}) park includes hiking trails and fire roads, including a grassy promontory from which a view of the northeastern portion of the San Fernando Valley may be seen. Mission Point and its environs are popular mountain biking and hiking areas. The view from the top of Mission Point (called "Mission Peak" by many residents), the highest point in Granada Hills, is striking, taking in most of the San Fernando Valley. In clear weather, one can see the Pacific Ocean and Downtown Los Angeles. The area around the peak is home to deer, golden eagle, bobcats, mountain lions, raccoons, and coyotes.

The Granada Hills Recreation Center (also known as Petit Park) features an auditorium, baseball diamonds, basketball courts, children's play areas, a gym, picnic tables, tennis courts, classrooms, a dance room and a library. Programs are offered in sports, and arts and crafts.

Zelzah Park, an unstaffed park, has a bridle path, a children's play area, and picnic tables.

== Government ==
=== Local ===
City Council

Los Angeles City Council District 12 encompasses Granada Hills, with councilmember John Lee serving.

Neighborhood Councils

Granada Hills is served by two Neighborhood Councils:

- Granada Hills North Neighborhood Council — Representing the area bounded by Los Angeles County line to the north, Aliso Canyon to the west (west of Zelzah), Interstate 5 and Interstate 405 to the east and California 118 to the south. Formed in fall, 2002.
- Granada Hills South Neighborhood Council — Representing the area bounded by California 118 to the north, Lindsey and Aliso Canyon to the west, Interstate 405 to the east, and Devonshire Street west of Balboa Bl and Lassen St east of Balboa Bl to the south.

=== County, state and federal ===
Granada Hills is in California's 27th congressional district as of 2023 and represented by Republican Mike Garcia. It was in the 38th State Assembly district, and the 20th State Senate district until the 2014 redistricting.

== Education ==
Thirty-two percent of Granada Hills residents aged 25 and older have earned a four-year degree by 2000, an average percentage for the city.

=== Schools ===
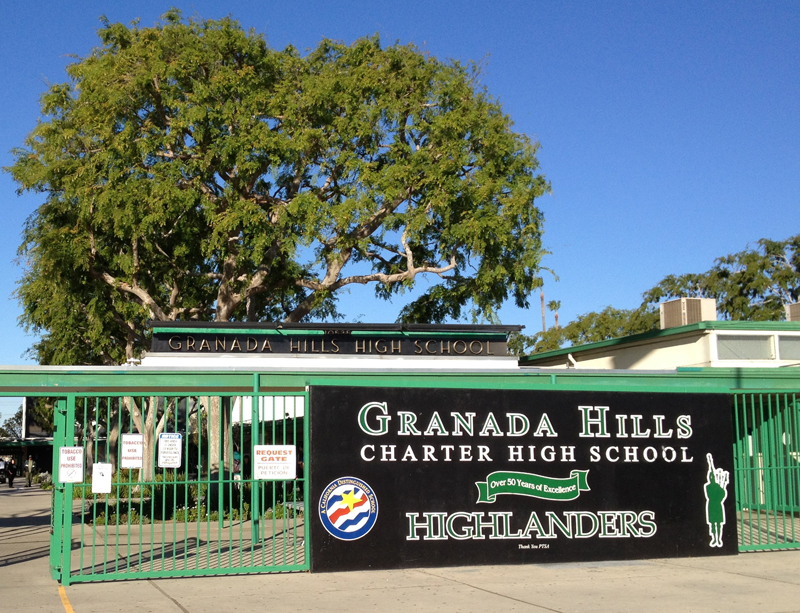
Granada Hills Charter High School

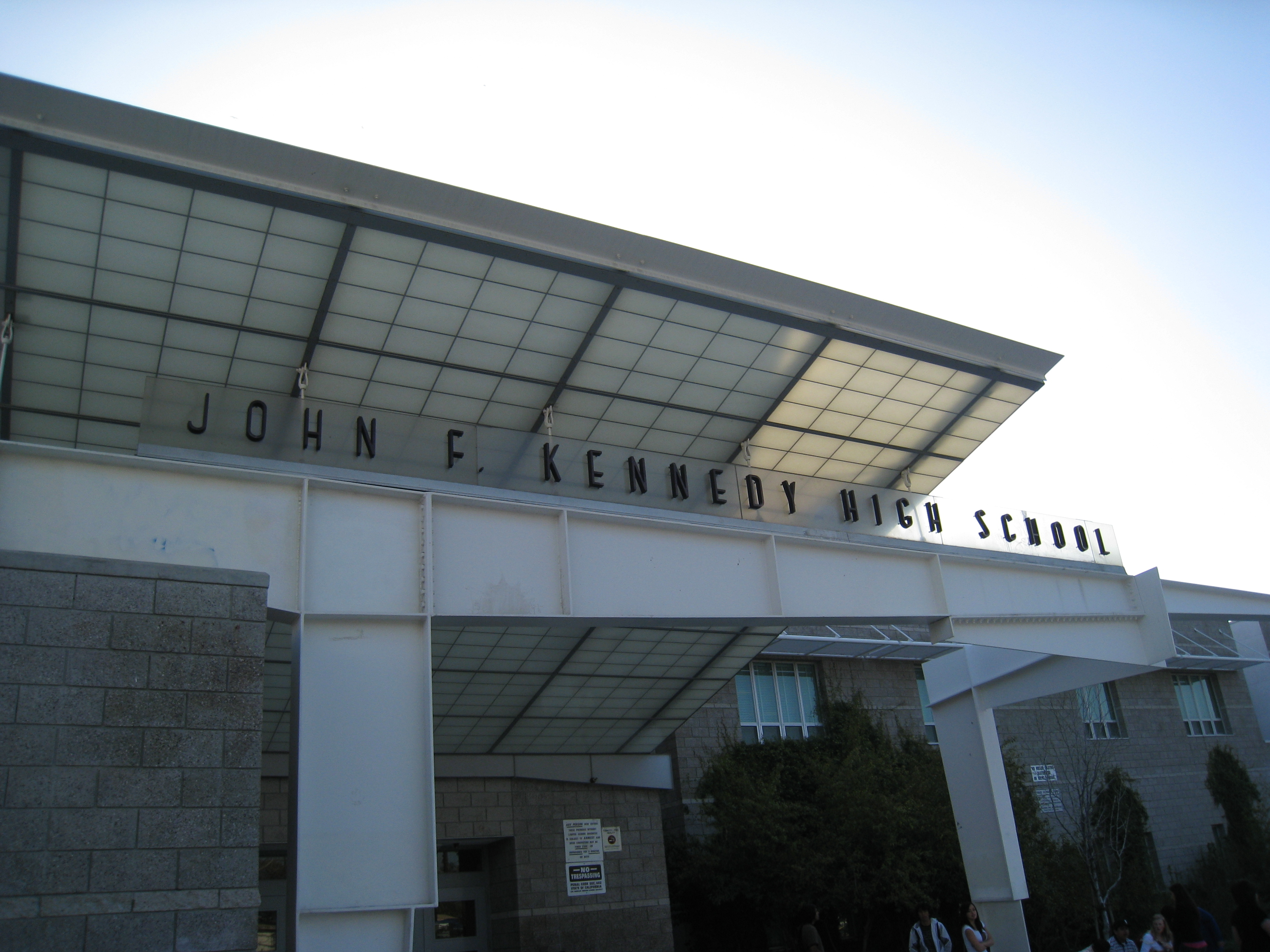
John F. Kennedy High School

Schools within the Granada Hills boundaries are:

==== Public ====
- John F. Kennedy High School, 11254 Gothic Avenue
- Granada Hills Charter High School (formerly Granada Hills High School), 10535 Zelzah Avenue
- Granada Hills Charter TK-8, 17081 Devonshire Street
- Jane Addams High School (continuation high school), 16341 Donmetz Street
- North Valley Charter Academy, 16651-A Rinaldi Street
- Valley Academy of Arts and Sciences, 10445 Balboa Boulevard
- George K. Porter Middle School, 15960 Kingsbury Street
- Robert Frost Middle School, 12314 Bradford Place
- Patrick Henry Middle School, 17340 San Jose Street
- El Oro Way Elementary Charter School, 12230 El Oro Way
- Knollwood Elementary School, 11822 Gerald Avenue
- Danube Avenue Elementary School, 11220 Danube Avenue
- Tulsa Street Elementary School, 10900 Hayvenhurst Avenue
- Haskell Elementary School, 15850 Tulsa Street
- Van Gogh Street Elementary School, 17160 Van Gogh Street
- Granada Elementary Community Charter School, 17170 Tribune Street
- Rinaldi Adult Center (Adult School), 17540 Rinaldi Street #6

==== Private ====
- St. Euphrasia School, Elementary, 17637 Mayerling Street
- Jewish Educational Trade School, 16601 Rinaldi Street
- Concordia Schools, preschool–8th grade, 16603 San Fernando Mission Boulevard
- Granada Hills Baptist Elementary School, 10949 Zelzah Avenue
- De La Salle Elementary School, 16535 Chatsworth Street
- Abraham Joshua Heschel Day School (elementary), 17701 Devonshire Street
- Heritage Christian School (formerly Hillcrest Christian School), 17531 Rinaldi Street (K–8), 10949 Zelzah Street (Preschool)
- Heritage Christian School (formerly Los Angeles Baptist High School), 9825 Woodley Ave.
- Iqra Elementary School, 11439 Encino Ave, Granada Hills, CA 91344 (preschool–7th)

== Infrastructure ==
=== Public services ===
Los Angeles Fire Department Stations 18 (Knollwood/Granada Hills) and 87 (Granada Hills) are in the area.

Granada Hills is served by the Los Angeles Police Department Devonshire Community Police Station.

=== Health care ===
The Los Angeles County Department of Health Services operates the Pacoima Health Center in Pacoima, serving Granada Hills.

=== Postal service ===
The United States Postal Service Granada Hills Post Office is located at 18039 Chatsworth Street.

=== Libraries ===
The Los Angeles Public Library operates the Granada Hills Branch and is located at 10640 Petit Avenue.

== Notable people ==
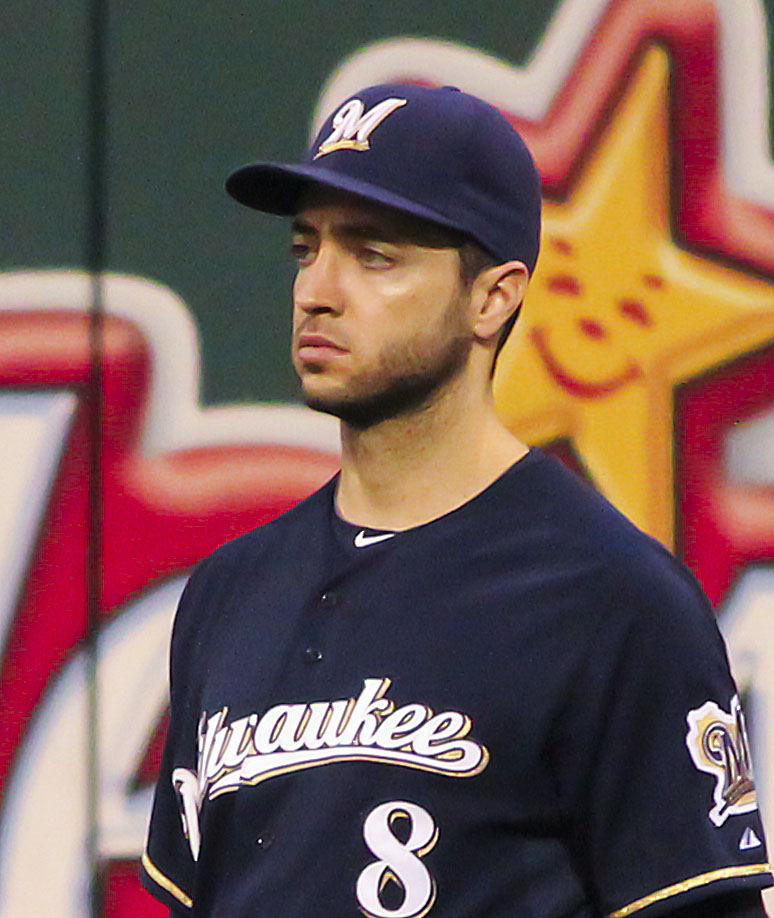
Ryan Braun

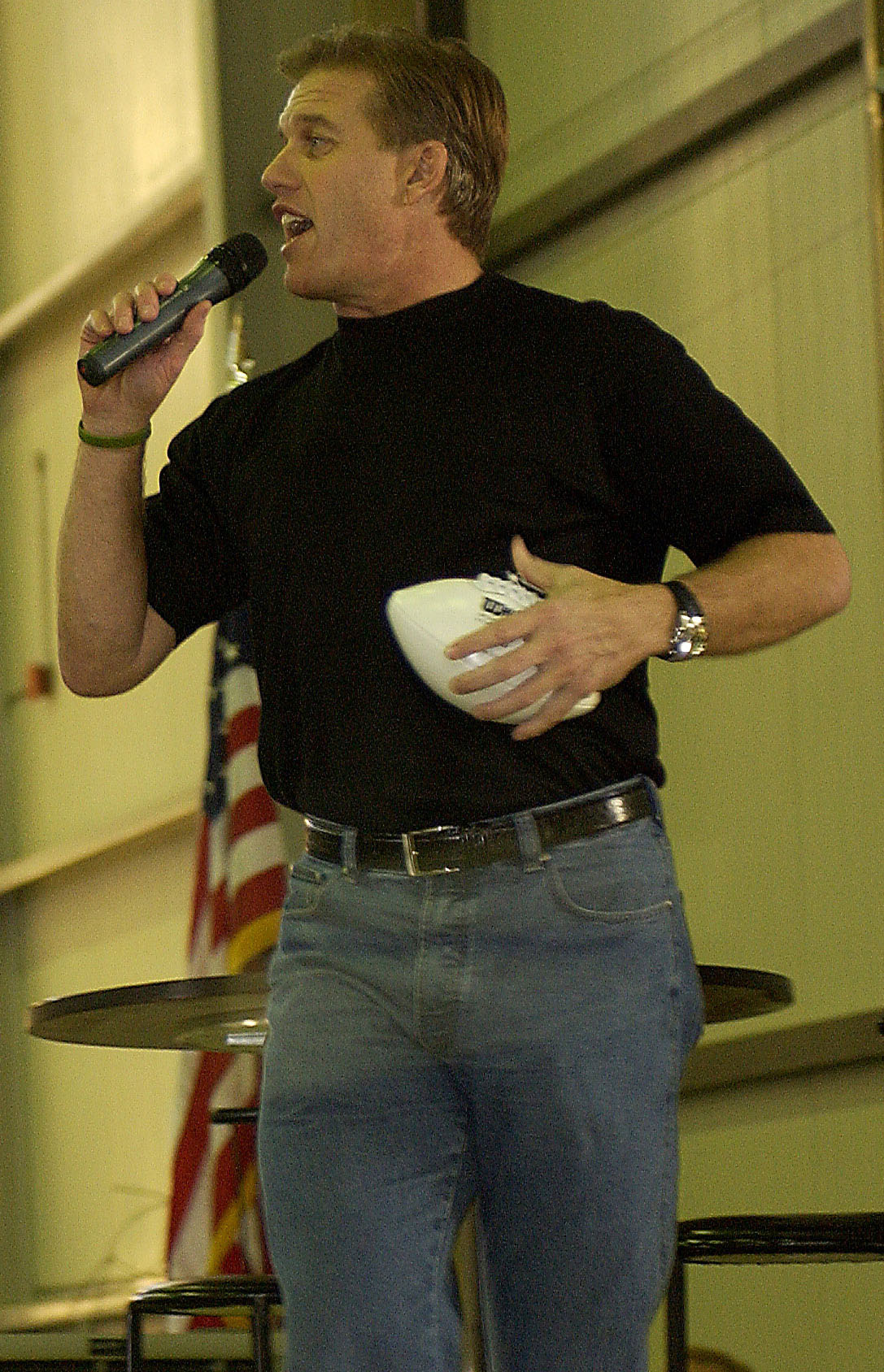
John Elway

- Hal Bernson, Los Angeles City Council member who fought the Sunshine Canyon project in the 1980s and 1990s
- Ryan Braun, professional baseball player, Granada Hills High School alumnus
- Jeff Bregel, professional football player, John F. Kennedy High School alumnus
- Corey Burton, voice actor, was born in Granada Hills
- James Cagney, actor, owned a large ranch in Granada Hills
- Chao-Li Chi, actor
- Leonard Eilers (1898–1996), American storyteller, actor
- John Elway, Denver Broncos quarterback
- Cuba Gooding Jr., actor, John F. Kennedy High School alumnus
- Stuart Gray, professional basketball player, John F. Kennedy High School alumnus
- Maurice Greene, track athlete
- Ashley Judd, actress, was born in Granada Hills
- Michaele Pride-Wells (born 1956), architect and educator; born and raised in Granada Hills
- Jim Rodnunsky, technician, inventor of the Cablecam system
- C. J. Sanders, football player at the University of Notre Dame
- Frank Wilcox, actor and "honorary mayor" of Granada Hills in the 1960s
- Steve Yeager (born 1948), Major League Baseball catcher

== See also ==
- List of districts and neighborhoods in Los Angeles
