= Mission Point =

Mission Point may refer to:

- Mission Point (California)
- Mission Point Light, Michigan
- Mission Point (Mackinac Island), Michigan
