= Leonard Eilers =

American storyteller (1898–1996)

- Born: Leonard John Eilers; June 23, 1898; Dodge, Nebraska, U.S.
- Died: March 19, 1996 (aged 97); Granada Hills, Los Angeles, California, U.S.
- Other names: Reverend Leonard Eilers; Preachin' Cowboy; Christian Cowboy
- Occupations: Storyteller, preacher, actor

Leonard John Eilers (June 23, 1898 – March 19, 1996), the "Preachin' Cowboy" or the "Christian Cowboy," was an American traveling storyteller, preacher, and short-lived actor and Hollywood cameraman who established the North Rim Ranch, also known as Eilers Ranch, in the San Fernando enclave of the San Fernando Valley in 1942. His camerawork included Victor Fleming's Abie's Irish Rose (1928) and Cecil B. DeMille's version of The Ten Commandments (1923).

== Early life ==
Eilers was born in Dodge, Nebraska and was nine months old when his father died. He was then raised by his grandmother in South Dakota until his mother remarried, from which point he went to live with his mother and stepfather on a Nebraskan farm; they later moved to the Rosebud Indian Reservation in South Dakota. He was inspired from a young age by a Wild West show in which there were rope tricks performed; this informed his interest in becoming a bonafide cowboy, an interest he began pursuing as a 17-year-old on the Laramie plains; at Frontier Park, Wyoming; and Diamond Ranch in Rock River, Wyoming, followed by time spent in Denver, Colorado and Nevada.

== Career ==
Bringing his skills as a cowboy to Hollywood, Eilers began appearing in films, primarily Westerns, not long after his move to California in 1922. However, Eilers found that Hollywood was full of "1,000 other cowboys like me," so he took to waiting tables and eventually transitioned to work as a cameraman, working under contract with Paramount on films such as Victor Fleming's Abie's Irish Rose and Cecil B. DeMille's 1923 version of The Ten Commandments. A piece of his writing on the technical aspects of photography equipment survives in a June 1927 Popular Mechanics issue.

Eilers eventually soured on the lifestyle demanded of movie business participants, turning to a synthesis of his passion for his skills as a cowboy and his devotion to Christianity to make his living. He attended the Bible Institute of Los Angeles (BIOLA) for two years, graduated, and helped build Hollywood's First Presbyterian Church, marrying the church secretary, Frances Keables, in 1926. They had two biological children, Leonard Eilers, Jr., and Joy Eilers (b. Feb. 13, 1934), and foster children. He began evangelizing, disseminating publications under the umbrella of Round-Up For God, with leaflets like "Go West, Young Man," "Breaking Into the Movies," and "Sing As You Ride." He also began touring the United States and Europe with his rope tricks, stories, music, and slide shows which "emphasized a Western context with titles such as 'God and the Rancher,' 'Trouble on the Range,' and 'Brand Inspection.'" His "happy, helpful, wholesome" and "absolutely unique" tour was dubbed a "Round-Up For God," with what he saw as "riding the range for God," or getting "into the saddle for God." Stops across California included King City's Community Baptist Church, Fullerton's First Baptist Church, Los Angeles's Atwater Park Baptist Church, Montebello's First Baptist Church, Ojai's Oak View Homes Baptist Church, Hermosa Beach Baptist Church, Oxnard's Presbyterian Church, Ventura's First Baptist Church, the First Baptist Church of Anaheim and Newhall's Presbyterian Church. Venturing beyond California, Eilers's stops ranged from the South Congregational Church in Centerville, Massachusetts; Bingen, Washington's Youth For Christ, Condon Baptist Church in Heppner, Oregon, and venues in Scottsdale, Arizona, Colorado Springs, Colorado, and Nampa, Idaho.

In 1941, Eilers traveled 25,000 miles bringing his evangelistic services to a variety of venues. In the first weeks of March 1942, he conducted 15+ series of speaking engagements alone, and had completed short engagements ministering over the radio and in elementary and high schools in ten Western states.

Between 1941 and 1942, "developed from barren patch beside Aliso Creek," Eilers and his wife established the 10-to-11-acre Eilers Ranch in San Fernando, Los Angeles, California, a ministry they would go on to operate for approximately fifty years as a refuge for troubled or otherwise-in-need teenagers as well as foster children and foreign students; during World War II, it was also home to children "from homes where the father was fighting overseas and the mother went to work to help provide for the family." For two years, the Granada Hills Community Church met at the ranch; it was also a meeting place for Girl Scouts troops, including Granada Hills's first Girl Scouts troop. In total, the couple estimated that they had provided temporary housing to some 500 youth over the decades.

While running his ministry, Eilers authored parables for publications such as The King's Business. In 1946, Eilers began hosting a worship group at his Granada Hills home which led to the establishment of the First Presbyterian Church of Granada Hills. In 1948, he attended an international conference about ministry to youth, and in the 1950s became involved with an organization of Christians in the film industry called the Hollywood Group whose focus was utilizing their film work to spread gospel.

In 1960, a "playmate" of Errol Flynn's, Beverly Aadland, came into Eilers's custody at his ranch; juvenile court granted Eilers and his wife custody over Aadland after her mother was charged with "contributing to her daughter's delinquency".

Into his 80s, Eilers continued his rope tricks, storytelling, and evangelizing.

== Death and legacy ==
Eilers died of pneumonia at age 97, on March 19, 1996 in Granada Hills. He is buried at Oakwood Cemetery in Chatsworth, California.

Author Barbara Dan wrote Eilers's biography.

== Bibliography ==
•Ropin' the Days: Thoughts By the Keeper of the Home Corral And Design (1979)

•Breaking Into the Movies (1938)
