= Oat Mountain (California) =

Mountain in California, United States of America

- Location within California Location within the United States

Highest point
- Elevation: 3,747 feet (1,142 m) NAVD 88
- Prominence: 1,947 ft (593 m)
- Coordinates: 34°19′47″N 118°36′02″W

Geography
- Location: Los Angeles County, California, U.S.
- Parent range: Santa Susana Mountains
- Topo map: Oat Mountain

Climbing
- Easiest route: Road hike

Oat Mountain is a mountain of the Santa Susana Mountains overlooking the San Fernando Valley (near Los Angeles, California) to the south and southeast. Oat Mountain is the highest peak in the Santa Susana Mountains of California. The Los Angeles district of Chatsworth is to the south of the mountain. There are many microwave relay antennas as well as Doppler weather equipment at Oat Mountain. SoCal Gas has several wells in the area as well.

== Climate ==
The weather on Oat Mountain varies seasonally. In January, occasional rain showers and thunderstorms may pass over the mountain. Colder storms produce light snow on its peaks when the area snow level drops below 4,000 feet. Spring is variable, some years very dry, others bringing heavy storms with upwards of 4" of rain and some snow. The summer is dry, with occasional thunderstorms (brought in by sub-tropical moisture in the Pacific Ocean) from the floors of the San Fernando Valley and Santa Clarita Valley; flash flooding may occur, triggering debris flows from burn scars in the area. Fall is typically dry and sunny, and Santa Ana Winds can cause small wildfires to spread on the mountain.

Climate data for Oat Mountain, California (elevation 3,747 ft)
Month	Jan	Feb	Mar	Apr	May	Jun	Jul	Aug	Sep	Oct	Nov	Dec	Year
Mean daily maximum °F (°C)	55 (13)	56 (13)	62 (17)	65 (18)	73 (23)	78 (26)	86 (30)	87 (31)	83 (28)	72 (22)	62 (17)	54 (12)	87 (31)
Daily mean °F (°C)	47 (8)	47 (8)	51 (11)	53 (12)	60 (16)	64 (18)	71 (22)	72 (22)	69 (21)	60 (16)	52 (11)	46 (8)	58 (14)
Mean daily minimum °F (°C)	39 (4)	37 (3)	40 (4)	41 (5)	47 (8)	50 (10)	56 (13)	56 (13)	55 (13)	48 (9)	42 (6)	38 (3)	37 (3)
Average precipitation inches (mm)	4.7 (120)	3.9 (99)	3.7 (94)	1.1 (28)	0.3 (7.6)	0.1 (2.5)	0 (0)	0.3 (7.6)	0.5 (13)	0.7 (18)	2.6 (66)	3.1 (79)	21 (530)
Average precipitation days (≥ 0.01 in)	5	4	5	2	0	0	0	0	1	1	3	4	25
Source: NOAA (via Google)

== Flora and fauna ==
Wildlife in the area is very sparse in summer months (though occasionally a bear can be spotted). Oat Mountain has typically the same type of flora and fauna found elsewhere in the mountain range. Mountain lions are particularly common in the region and can be seen almost year round, along with birds like the turkey vulture and the Canada goose.

Vegetation is not very diverse on the mountain. The mountain is usually covered in brown grass and oats in the summer, but during heavy periods of rain it is usually green and contains more wildlife.

== Human impact ==
Two Cold War-era SAM-A-7 (Surface-to-Air Missile, Army, design 7, later changed to MIM-3 (Mobile Interceptor Missile, design 3) Nike Ajax and SAM-A-25/MIM-14 Nike Hercules) anti-aircraft missile sites were constructed on Oat Mountain to guard important military and industrial facilities like the Santa Susana Field Lab, from Soviet attack. Known as Nike Missile Site LA-88, they were in operation from 1956-1974. Since their abandonment, debris and abandoned buildings are found in that area, located on Browns Canyon Road below Oat Mountain.

In 2015, a gas leak was reported at one of the seven oil fields on the mountain of the Aliso Canyon Oil Field The oil field was shut down and taken to court. As of August 2017, the oil field was scheduled to reopen but may be taken to the city regional court in Los Angeles or to the federal court in Sacramento.

== Hiking trails ==
One of the main hiking trails on Oat Mountain ascends its San Fernando Valley side, with four connecting trails. One leads to the Nike Missile Site LA-88 and its abandoned buildings, vehicles, and rubble. A challenging 16-mile hike follows the forrested backbone of the mountain in Santa Clarita to Rocky Peak.

== See also ==
- Aliso Canyon Oil Field
- Chatsworth Peak
- Mission Point
- Rocky Peak
- Sand Rock Peak
- Porter Ranch, California
