= Michaele Pride-Wells =

American architect (born 1956)

- Born: Michaele Pride; 1956 (age 69–70); Granada Hills, Los Angeles, California, U.S.
- Education: Arizona State University; Harvard University Graduate School of Design
- Occupations: Architect, educator
- Years active: 1981–present
- Spouse: Reginald Wells
- Children: 1

Michaele Pride-Wells (born 1956) is an American architect and educator. She is a professor of architecture at the University of New Mexico. She was the first woman-owned and operated architecture firm in the state of California. Pride-Wells was the founder of the firm RE: Architecture (1989–1996) in California. She was also the first African American woman to head an architecture program in a majority institution when she joined the University of Kentucky in 1996.

== Biography ==
Michaele Pride-Wells was born in 1956 in the Granada Hills neighborhood in Los Angeles, California to parents Leatrice and Wallace Pride. She attended John F. Kennedy High School in Granada Hills, class of 1974. Pride-Wells graduated with a B.Arch 1981 from Arizona State University. She is married to Reginald Wells and they have one child.

In 1989, she opened her own firm RE: Architecture (also known as "Regarding Architecture" in Los Angeles and later in Marina del Rey. She was the first woman-owned and operated architecture firm in the state of California. She helped found the Design Professionals’ Coalition, a nonprofit which brought together architects, engineers and other builders after the 1992 Los Angeles riots, in order to help the local community rebuild. In 1995, she served as an architectural consultant for the Leimert Park neighborhood developments, funded by the Los Angeles Neighborhood Initiative.

By 1996, she closed her firm in California to moved to Lexington, Kentucky. She served as the director of the University of Kentucky's downtown community design center starting in 1996; and "became the first African American woman to head an architecture program in a majority institution". She was one of the fifteen judges for the creation of the Oklahoma Bombing Memorial (now known as the Oklahoma City National Memorial). In 2001, she graduated with a M.AUD in Urban Design from Harvard University Graduate School of Design.

Prior to joining the University of New Mexico, she additionally has taught at the University of Cincinnati (2003–2009); the University of California, Los Angeles; Woodbury University; and the University of Southern California.

== Publications ==
- Bailey, K; Grossardt, T.; Pride-Wells, M. (2017). "Community Design of a Light Rail Transit-Oriented District using CAVE (Casewise Visual Evaluation)". Socio-Economic Planning Sciences. 41 (3): 235–254. doi:10.1016/j.seps.2006.04.002.

== See also ==
- African-American architects
