= Simi Valley (valley) =

Valley in Southern California

Coordinates: 34°16′42″N 118°42′39″W

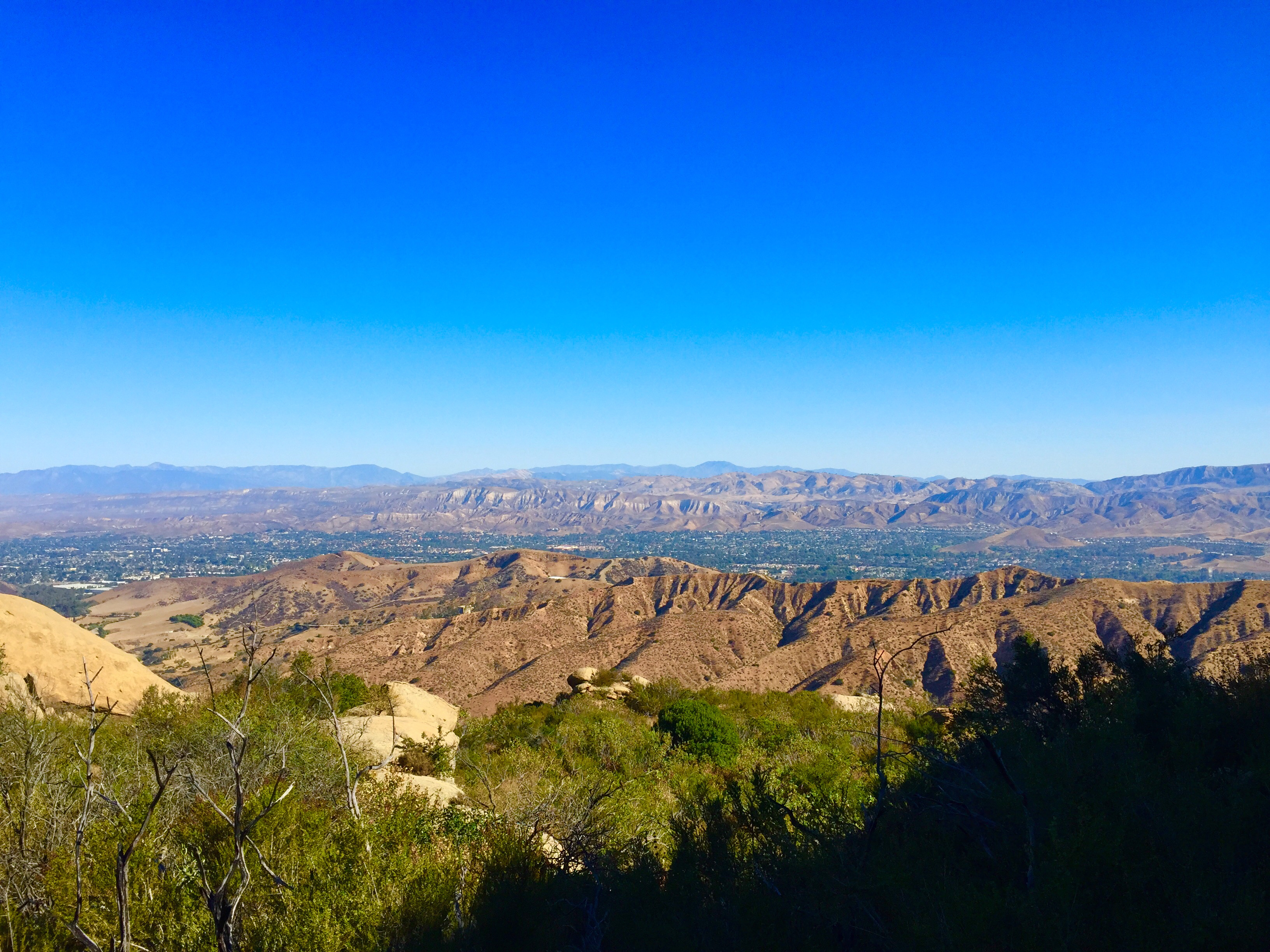
The Simi Valley as seen from Sage Ranch Park

Simi Valley (Chumash: Shimiyi) is a synclinal valley in Southern California in the United States. It is an enclosed or hidden valley surrounded by mountains and hills. It is connected to the San Fernando Valley to the east by the Santa Susana Pass, with the Coast Railway Line and the 118 (Ronald Reagan) freeway providing the infrastructure to do so, with the same infrastructure doing so in the west narrows of the Arroyo Simi to Moorpark. The relatively flat bottom of the valley contains soils formed from shales, sandstones, and conglomerates eroded from the surrounding hills of the Santa Susana Mountains to the north, which separate Simi Valley from the Santa Clara River Valley, and the Simi Hills.

== Geology ==
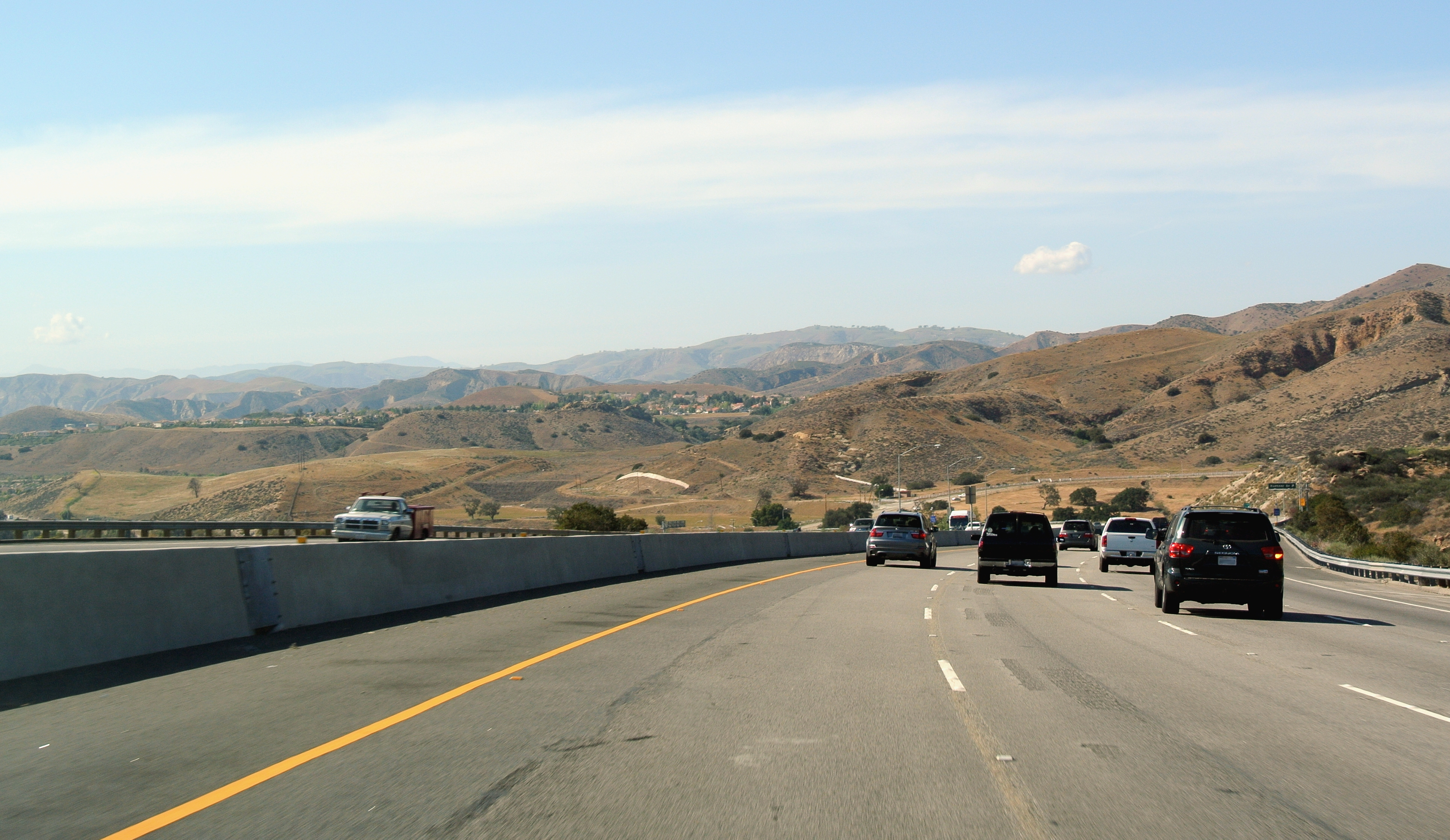
California State Route 118 east of Simi Valley, seen westwards

Simi Valley borders the Santa Susana Mountains to the north and Simi Hills to the east and south. The valley covers an area of about 62 square miles (160 km^{2}) in southern Ventura County, bordering the San Fernando Valley in Los Angeles County. The Santa Clara River Valley occupies the northwestern corner of the valley. Mountainous terrain of South Mountain and Oak Ridge characterizes the northern and central area. Elevation within the quadrangle ranges from about 250 feet (76 m) along the arroyo bottoms to over 2,200 feet (670 m). Steep, highly dissected slopes form much of the boundary of the area. In the southeast, Little Simi Valley, drained by Arroyo Simi/Arroyo Las Posas, separates the southern flank of Oak Ridge from the Las Posas Hills. The Las Posas upland area, a broad elevated region that slopes gently to the south, separates the South Mountain-Oak Ridge highlands from the Las Posas-Camarillo Hills between Little Simi Valley on the east and the Oxnard Plain on the west. This relatively low-lying area is also referred to as the Las Posas Valley. Numerous north-south-trending drainages cut South Mountain and Oak Ridge creating steep narrow canyons on north-facing slopes and wide flat-bottomed canyons with incised streams on south-facing slopes. A network of residential streets and ranch and oilfield roads that traverse the area from U.S. Highway 101 and state highways 118, 23, and 126 provides access to the area. Current land use includes citrus and avocado orchards, oil well drilling and production, sand and gravel quarries, decorative-rock quarries, cattle grazing, suburban residential development, and golf courses. The oldest geologic unit mapped in the Simi Valley quadrangle is the upper Cretaceous Chatsworth Formation. The Sespe Formation consists of alluvial fan and floodplain deposits of interbedded pebble-cobble conglomerate, massive to thick-bedded sandstone, and thin-bedded siltstone and clay-stone. In the northern part of the map area, Sespe Formation is overlain by and inter-fingers with the upper Oligocene to lower Miocene Vaqueros Formation that is composed of transitional and marine sandstone, siltstone, and claystone with local sandy coquina beds. In the Las Posas Hills, Sespe Formation is unconformably overlain by marine sandstones of the middle Miocene Topanga Group that are interlayered with and intruded by basalt flows, breccia, and diabase dikes of the Conejo Volcanics.

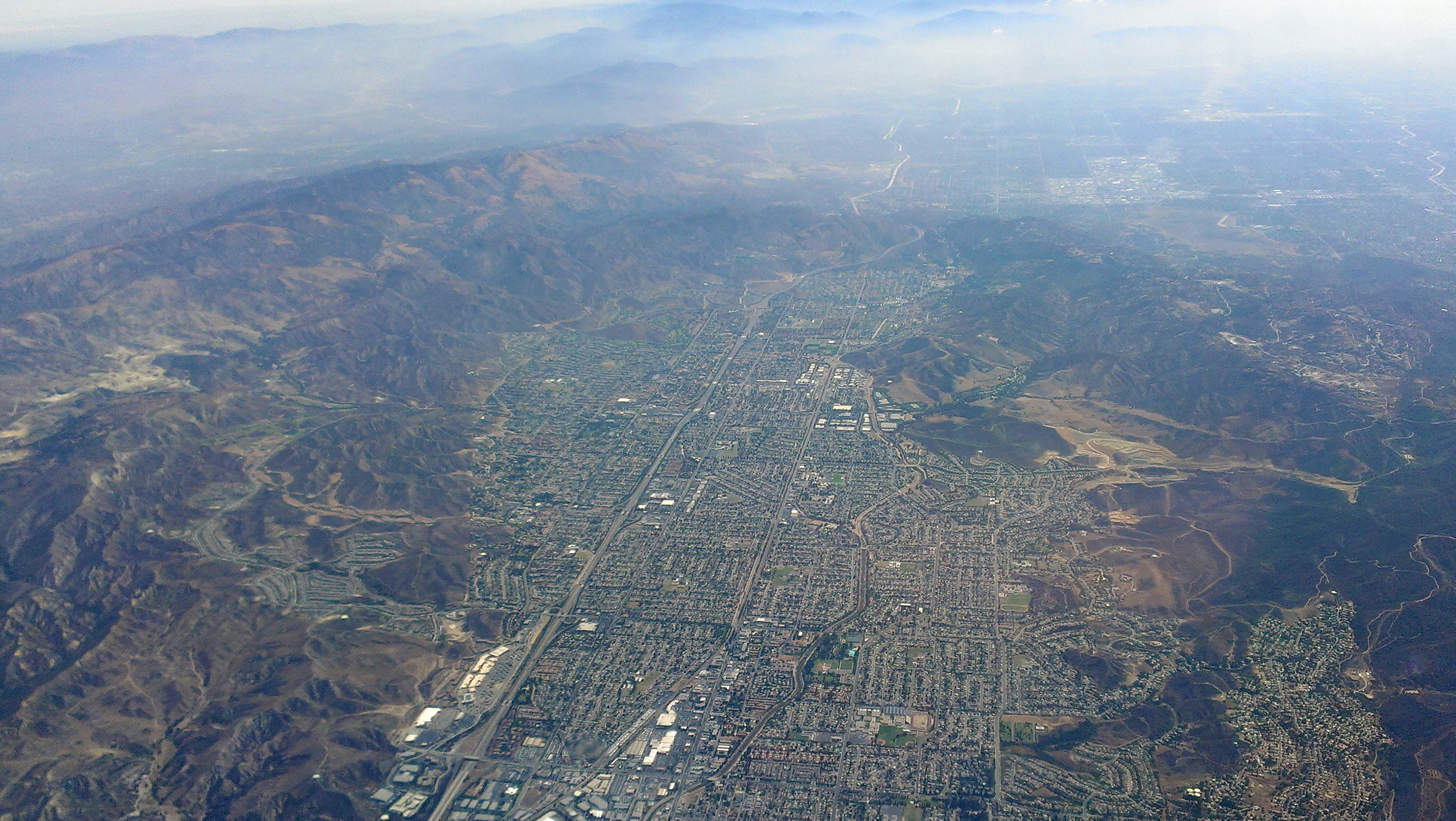
Suburban development in Simi Valley

Deep-marine strata of the upper Miocene Modelo Formation cover the Vaqueros Formation and Topanga Group along the crests and southern flanks of South Mountain and Oak Ridge. They also occur as isolated outcrops in the Las Posas Hills. Locally, Modelo Formation consists of interbedded diatomaceous shale, claystone, mudstone, and siltstone with minor sandstone, limestone, chert, and tuff beds. The most widely exposed rock units in the area are the Plio-Pleistocene marine and non-marine Pico and Saugus Formations that crop out on the southern flank of South Mountain-Oak Ridge. Locally, the Pico Formation consists of marine siltstone and silty shale with minor sandstone and pebbly sandstone. The Saugus Formation overlies and interfingers with the Pico Formation and is composed of interbedded shallow-marine to brackish water sandstone, siltstone, pebble-to-cobble conglomerate, and coquina beds that grade laterally and vertically into non-marine sandstone, siltstone, and conglomerate. A local member of the Saugus Formation is exposed in the southwest corner of the map area. It is predominantly a volcanic breccia conglomerate that resembles the Conejo Volcanics breccia, but is believed to represent remnants of landslide debris shed from the Conejo Volcanics into a local trough during Saugus time.

Valley surficial deposits cover the floor and margins of the Little Simi Valley, Santa Clara River Valley in the north, and Arroyo Las Posas in the south, and extend up into the larger canyons that drain South Mountain and Oak Ridge. Extensive surficial deposits are also present in the Las Posas upland area in the southwest. These upper Pleistocene to Holocene sediments consist of older and younger alluvial fan and valley deposits, colluvium, active alluvial fans, and active stream deposits. Pleistocene- to Holocene-age landslide deposits are widespread throughout the Simi quadrangle, especially in the finer grained Tertiary sedimentary units where bedding planes are dip slopes. In addition, massive slumps are present in the Sespe and Vaqueros Formations on anti-dip slopes. Seismic and well data from the San Fernando Valley document evolution of that region from mid-Miocene rifting to north-south contraction. Formations in the western San Fernando Valley subsurface (Cretaceous to Paleogene strata, and Miocene Topanga and Modelo Formations) trace southward to outcrops in the Santa Monica Mountains that constrain faulting along the valley's south basin edge. Cretaceous strata in the Simi Uplift to the west are over 2 km higher than equivalent strata beneath the western San Fernando Valley across a boundary marked by the Chatsworth Reservoir fault, and Neogene thinning and off-lap. The Simi fault, located at the eastern end of the Simi-Santa Rosa fault system, bounds the northern margins of the Simi and Tierra Rejada Valleys. West of Simi Valley, the Simi fault has placed Miocene Conejo Volcanics over Plio-Pleistocene Saugus Formation rocks. The 15.5 ± 0.8 m.y.a. base of the Conejo Volcanics, identified in oil well logs, is inferred to have a dip-slip separation of about 425 to 550 m, suggesting a low long-term slip rate of about 0.03 mm/yr. However, substantial late Quaternary offset is suggested by the presence of more than 150 m of Pleistocene and younger alluvium that fills the east-west trending, down-dropped bedrock trough beneath western Simi Valley. In addition, trenching within faulted colluvial deposits in Tierra Rejada Valley has revealed evidence of multiple shears within Holocene deposits.
