= John F. Kennedy High School (Los Angeles) =

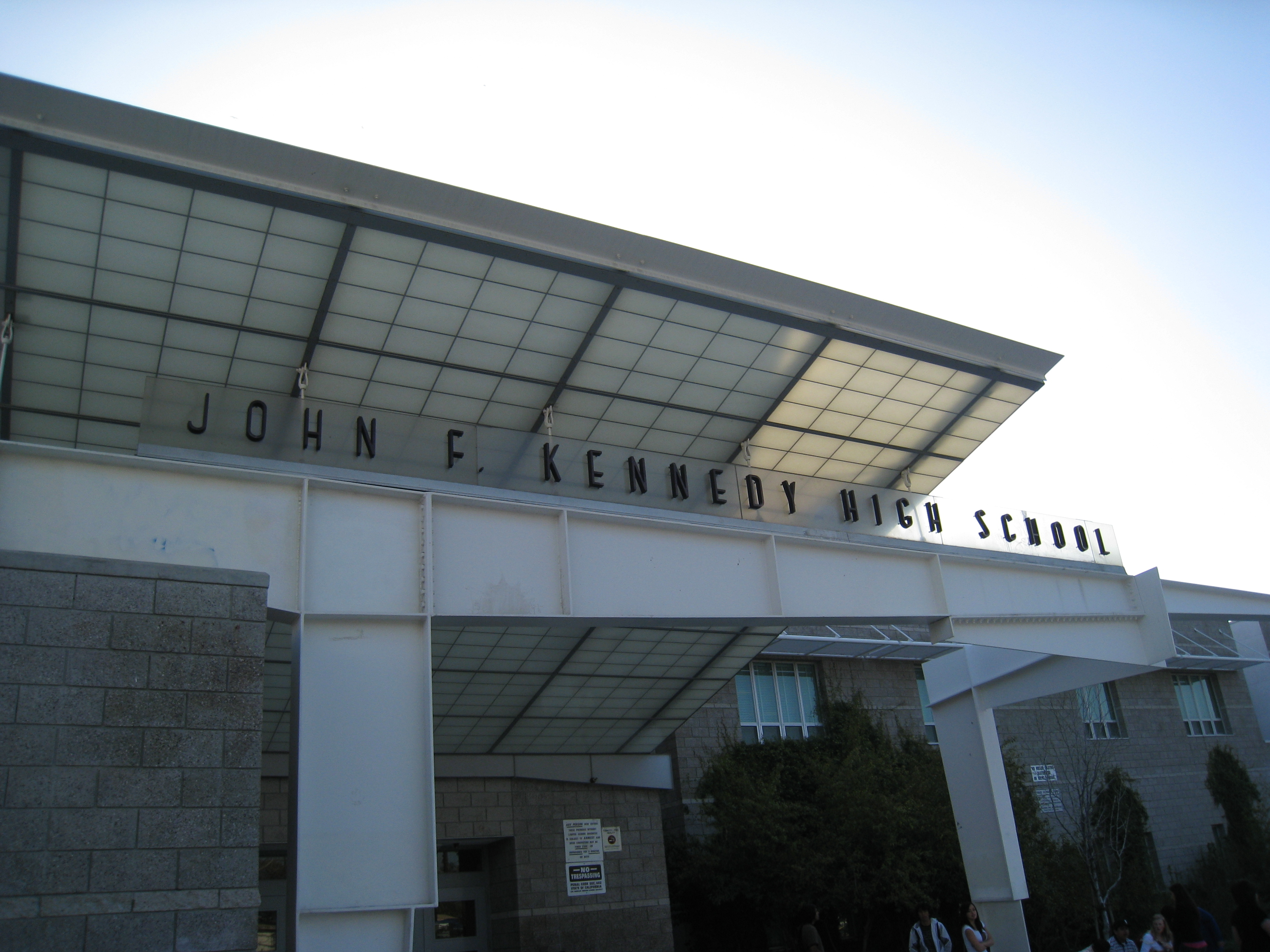

Location
- 11254 Gothic Avenue; 34.275°N 118.488°W; Los Angeles, California 91344; United States

Information
- Type: Public
- Established: 1971
- Status: 🟩 Opened
- School district: Los Angeles Unified School District
- Principal: Oscar Vazquez
- Staff: 117.14 (FTE)
- Grades: 9–12
- Student to teacher ratio: 18.91
- Colors: Brown and gold
- Mascot: Golden Cougar
- Newspaper: The Word
- Website: Official website

John F. Kennedy High School (JFKHS) is a four-year public high school located in Granada Hills, Los Angeles, in the U.S. state of California. It is in District 1 of the Los Angeles Unified School District.

== History ==
The school was relieved of overcrowding when Valley Region High School 4 and Valley Region High School 5 opened in 2011.

The new principal is Mr. Oscar Vazquez.

== Academic programs ==
John F. Kennedy High School has different programs for students or parents. Kennedy has three magnet programs. There is an Architecture, Digital Design & Filmmaking Magnet, a Highly Gifted/High-Ability Medical Magnet, and a Global Leadership & Environmental Action Magnet (GLEAM). Architecture, Digital Design & Filmmaking Magnet.There are also Advanced Placement (AP) classes students can take in preparation for college. All AP classes can contribute to college credit if AP tests are passed with a score of 3 or higher. Advancement Via Individual Determination (AVID), Bilingual Program, Impact, Freshman Transition Program, The Carl D. Perkins Program, School for Advanced Studies, Teaching Academy, and Kennedy High School Work Experience Program are other programs that are offered by the school.

== Extracurricular activities ==
=== Sports ===
The school offers several sports teams such as: football, Marching Band, color guard, golf, cross country, volleyball, tennis, basketball, soccer, baseball, softball, track, water polo and swim. There are both girls and boys teams for golf, volleyball, tennis, and soccer. As well as a NJROTC program

=== Academies ===
There is a Teaching Academy available for students:

- Teaching Academy

== College Center ==
The college center is available for seniors and all other students who can use help or advice about their future. The college center gives information about college applications, personal statements, it also holds workshops to help students fill out college applications, scholarships, FAFSA and resumes. An important calendar is provided for seniors so deadlines are not missed.

== School based clinic ==
Kennedy's school based clinic, also known as Hathaway-Sycamores, CFS, El Nido Family Center, is available for Kennedy students as well as the students' family members from ages 2 to 18. Some of the services available include physicals, lab work, and counseling.

== Notable alumni ==
- Garret Anderson, Major League Baseball player
- Jack Cassel, Major League Baseball player
- Rashied Davis, professional football player
- Darren Daye, professional basketball player
- Jon Garland, Major League Baseball player
- Cuba Gooding Jr., actor
- Stuart Gray, professional basketball player
- Wendy Greuel, Los Angeles Controller and City Council member
- Jacob Hopkins, actor
- Denean Howard, Olympic track athlete
- Sherri Howard, Olympic track athlete
- Dion Lambert, professional football player
- Mark McMillian, professional football player
- Michaele Pride-Wells (born 1956), architect and educator
- Mike Pringle, Canadian Football League player
- Tom Ramsey, professional football player
- Bill Schultz, professional football player
- Terrmel Sledge, Major League Baseball player

== See also ==
- List of memorials to John F. Kennedy
