= O'Melveny Park =

Public park and nature preserve in Los Angeles, California

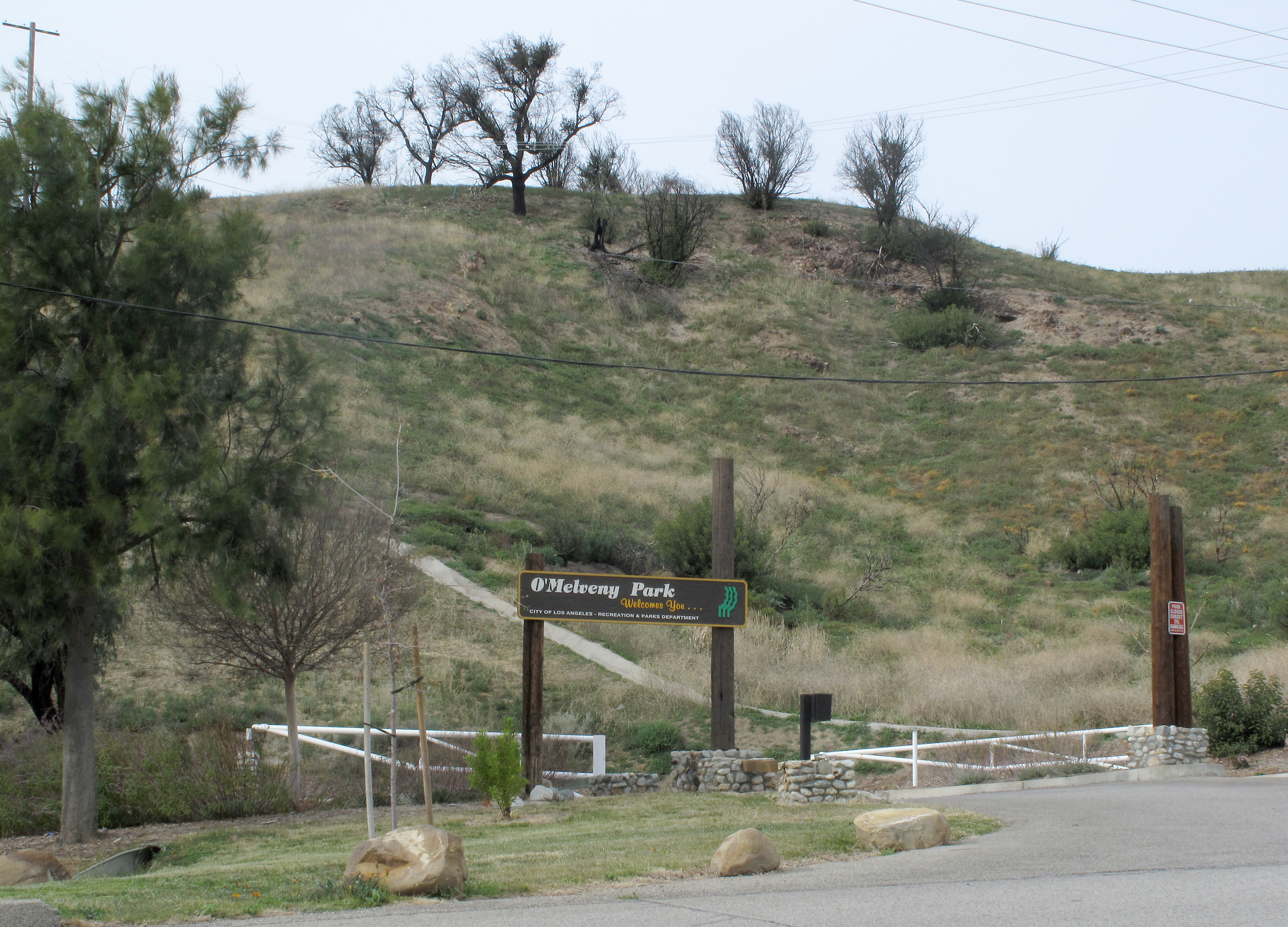
- Entrance
- Interactive map of O'Melveny Park
- Type: Urban park-Regional park-Nature reserve
- Location: 17300 Sesnon Boulevard; Granada Hills, CA 91344
- Coordinates: 34°19′N 118°31′W
- Area: 672 acres (272 ha)
- Created: 1973
- Operator: Los Angeles Department of Recreation & Parks
- Status: Open all year
- Website: laparks.org/park/omelveny

O'Melveny Park is a public park in the Santa Susana Mountains, in the Granada Hills community of the northern San Fernando Valley, in the northernmost portion of the City of Los Angeles, California.

== History ==
The park is named after Henry W. O'Melveny, who founded one of Los Angeles' oldest law firms, O'Melveny & Myers, which represented many early Los Angeles founder and developer families, and in 1927 was one of the original members of the California State Parks Commission.

The land was purchased in 1941 by attorney John O'Melveny, son of Henry W. O'Melveny, and was originally named C. J. Ranch before it was later acquired by The Trust for Public Land and turned into a park. The ranch was used for growing citrus fruit, grazing cattle, and raising bulldogs. In the early 1970's John O'Melveny arranged for his wife Corinne O'Melveny's estate to sell her half interest in the property to the City at below market price while he donated his half interest to the City outright. In 1976, O'Melveny arranged for the land to be deeded to the city for a park.

The installation of commemorative plaques in honor of the O'Melvenys was approved with support of the Granada Hills North Neighborhood Council in July 2008 by the Board of Recreation and Park Commissioners; they were installed near the park caretaker's house and in front of a picnic area.

=== Archer Fire ===
During the 2025 Southern California Wildfires, the park was affected by the Archer Fire which started on January 10 at 11:24 a.m. and spread to 19 acres (7.7 ha). Under erratic wind conditions, the fire threatened to spread into the main part of the park as well as the surrounding neighborhood which was immediately placed under evacuation orders. About a half hour after its ignition, forward progress was quickly halted by firefighters, aided by water-dropping helicopters, and the evacuation orders were revised to warnings before being lifted by 1:44 p.m. The fire was halted at 19 acres (7.7 ha) and spread on the light to medium brush over the hills to the east of the main park area and north of the parking lot, but no structures were damaged.

== Park ==
O'Melveny Park is the second largest public park in Los Angeles after Griffith Park. O'Melveny Park is managed by the City of Los Angeles Department of Recreation and Parks.

It provides large grassy areas, picnic tables, and is known for its hiking and horse trails and the views they lead to. Near the entrance is a grove of citrus trees, nearly all of which are Grapefruit.

A caretaker resides in a residence in the park.

== See also ==
- Santa Susana Mountains
- California chaparral and woodlands – Ecoregion
- Chaparral – plant community
- California oak woodland – plant community
- Oaks – List of Quercus species
- Quercus agrifolia
