= Sand Rock Peak (California) =

Mountain in California, United States of America

- Location within California

Highest point
- Elevation: 2,511 ft (765 m) NGVD 29
- Coordinates: 34°22′08″N 118°36′23″W

Geography
- Location: Los Angeles County, California, U.S.
- Parent range: Santa Susana Mountains
- Topo map: USGS Oat Mountain

Climbing
- Easiest route: Road hike

Sand Rock Peak is a mountain in California, United States. It overlooks Newhall and the rest of Santa Clarita Valley to the northeast. The summit is at an elevation of 2,511 feet (765 m).

Sand Rock Peak is part of the Santa Susana Mountains. Oat Mountain, a higher mountain, is south of Sand Rock Peak, and can be seen from there.

== See also ==
- Rocky Peak
