= Sage Ranch Park =

Public park and nature preserve in Ventura County, California

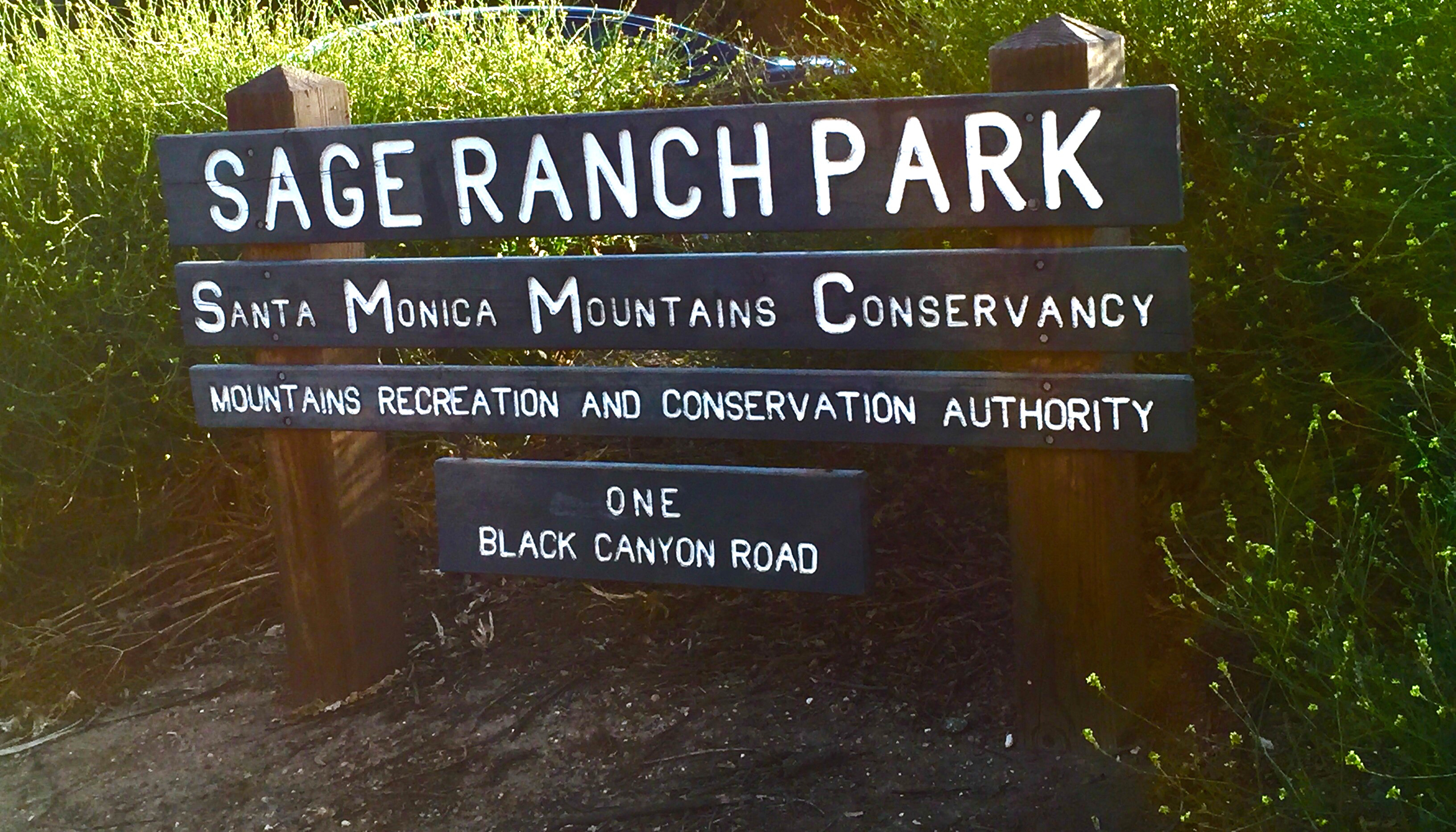
- Sign at the entrance
- Interactive map of Sage Ranch Park
- Type: Open-space park
- Location: Simi Valley, CA
- Coordinates: 34°14′33″N 118°40′33″W
- Area: 635 acres (257 ha)
- Created: 1980
- Operator: Santa Monica Mountains Conservancy
- Status: Open

Sage Ranch Park is a 625-acre park (253 ha) and wildlife corridor located at a 2,000 feet (610 m) height in the northwestern Simi Hills on the northwestern plateau of the Simi Valley, bordering Los Angeles County and its San Fernando Valley. The campground area used to be a cattle ranch and later a filmset for Western movies. Sage Ranch Park is today an intermountain wildlife corridor, which links the Simi Hills with the Santa Susana- and Santa Monica Mountains. The mountainous park is mostly known for its unique sandstone rock formations, maybe particularly on its western side where the Sandstone Ridge and Turtle Rock are situated. On its northern side, there are great panoramic rural and metropolitan views of the Simi Valley, as well as surrounding Simi Hills, Santa Susana Mountains and beyond. It is home to numerous sandstone formations, caves, outcroppings, tilted rock formations, several hiking trails, a camping ground, as well as native flora and wildlife. The area is lined with coastal sage scrub and other flora includes chaparral, bush lupine, California poppy, sunflowers, Cream Cups, bracken, sword fern, prickly pear cactus, eucalyptus trees, oak woodland of ceanothus, coffee berry, California buckwheat, sycamore, Walnut Tree, ferns, orange- and avocado trees. It is a critical cross-mountain wildlife corridor and is home to fauna such as mountain lions, bobcats, eagles, vultures, owls, rattle snakes, coyotes, hawks, grey fox, king snakes, and more. Bordering Sage Ranch to the south is the Rocketdyne Santa Susana Field Laboratory, in which the nearby Burro Flats Painted Cave is located.

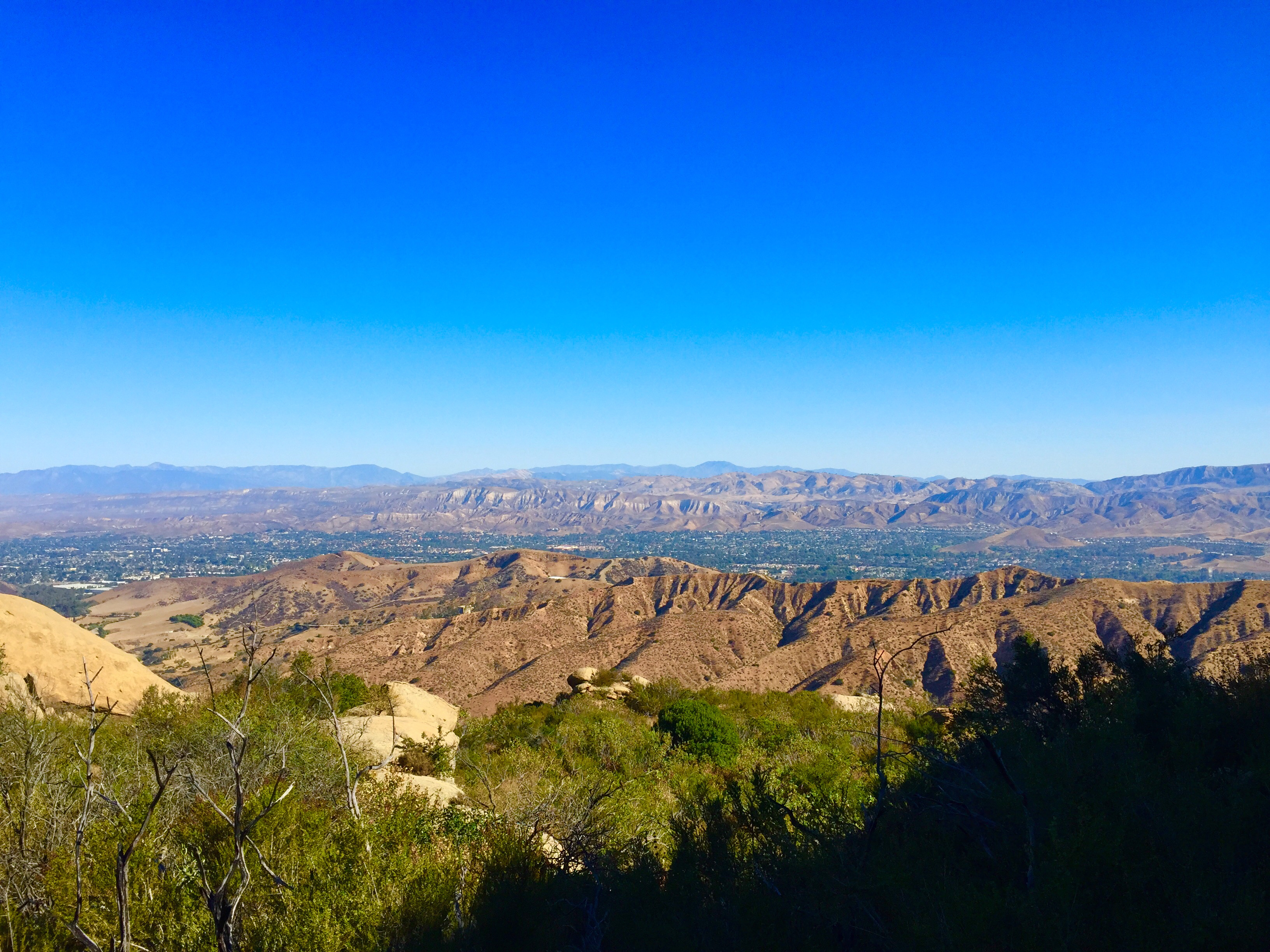
Simi Valley seen from the northernmost point in the park

It is an area for a wide variety of recreational activities such as running, mountain biking, hiking, wildlife viewing, photographing, rock climbing, and is also open for camping. Because of its high elevation, you can see as far as the Channel Islands, the Santa Monica Mountains, the Pacific Ocean, and the San Gabriel Mountains on clear days. To get here from Woodland Hills, Los Angeles, follow the Ventura Freeway (U.S. 101) in Woodland Hills, exit on Valley Circle Boulevard and drive north six miles to Woolsey Canyon Road. Turn left (west) and proceed 2.7 miles to Sage Ranch Park. The park entrance is on the left, a short distance past the Rockwell International Santa Susana Field Laboratory, where Woolsey Canyon Road bends north and continues as Black Canyon Road. From Chatsworth, Los Angeles, take the 118 to Topanga Canyon Boulevard, south to Plummer, and then turn right. Follow Plummer to the intersection with Box Canyon and turn left into Valley Circle and then turn right at Woolsey Canyon Road. The entrance to Sage Ranch Park is 200 yards north of the intersection between Woolsey Canyon and Black Canyon Road. From Simi Valley, take Kuehner south and turn right at Katherine Road in eastern Simi Valley. Follow Katherine and turn right after crossing the railroad tracks. At Black Canyon Road, turn left and follow the uphill winding road up to Sage Ranch Park. It is situated in the most eastern part of Ventura County and the Simi Valley city limits. The address is 1 Black Canyon Rd, Simi Valley, CA 93065.

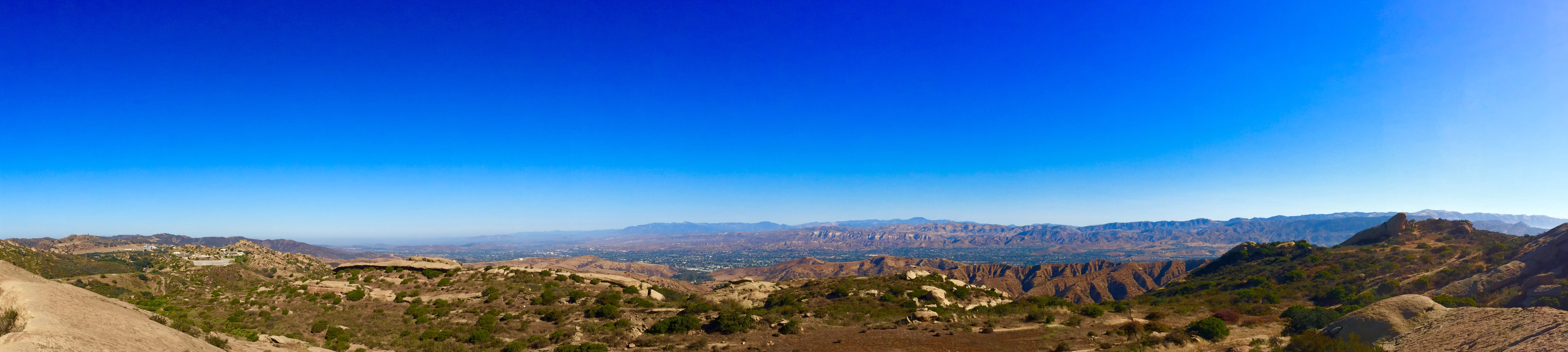
Panoramic view of Simi Valley from the Loop Trail. There are short paths from the northern part of the trail leading to great vista points overlooking Simi Valley.

== Filmography ==
Dundas Ranch was located where Sage Ranch Park sits today. A large number of films were shot at Dundas Ranch and surrounding Burro Flats. Movies shot here include:

- Arizona Legion (1939)
- The Kansas Terrors (1939)
- Rovin' Tumbleweeds (1939)
- Zorro's Fighting Legion (1939)
- Adventures of Red Ryder (1940)
- Carson City Kid (1940)
- Covered Wagon Days (1940)
- Frontier Vengeance (1940)
- Texas Terrors (1940)
- The Bandit Trail (1941)
- Gangs of Sonora (1941)
- Robbers of the Range (1941)
- Robin Hood of the Pecos (1941)
- Wanderers of the West (1941)
- Wyoming Wildcat (1941)
- Arizona Terror (1942)
- Call of the Canyon (1942)
- Heart of the Open Range (1942)
- The Lone Star Vigilantes (1942)
- Man From Cheyenne (1942)
- Sundown Jim (1942)
- Calling Wild Bill Elliott (1943)
- Thundering Trails (1943)
- Arizona Whirlwind (1944)
- Under Western Skies (1945)
- California (1946)
- Bandit King of Texas (1949)
- Vigilante Hideout (1950)
- Al Jennings of Oklahoma (1951)
- Thunder in God's Country (1951)
- Utah Wagon Train (1951)
- Brave Warriors (1952)
- Rancho Notorious (1952)
- Wagons West (1952)
- Bandits of the West (1953)
- Down Laredo Way (1953)
- The Homesteaders (1953)
- Iron Mountain Trail (1953)
- Jack Slade (1953)
- The Nebraskan (1953)
- Red River Shore (1953)
- Ride Clear of Diablo (1953)
- Shadows of Tombstone (1953)
- Wings of the Hawk (1953)
- Apache (1954)
- The Black Dakotas (1954)
- Drums Across the River (1954)
- Overland Pacific (1954)
- Phantom Stallion (1954)
- They Rode West (1954)

== See also ==
- Burro Flats Painted Cave
