= Jewish Educational Trade School =

High school and technical college for young Jewish men

Coordinates: 34.279859°N 118.494109°W

The Jewish Educational Trade School (JETS) is a technical college and high school for young Jewish men. It is in the San Fernando Valley region of Greater Los Angeles.
