= Chatsworth Peak =

Mountain in California, United States

Highest point
- Elevation: 2,313 ft (705 m) NAVD 88
- Coordinates: 34°15′25″N 118°38′26″W

Geography
- Location: Ventura County, California, U.S.
- Parent range: Simi Hills
- Topo map: USGS Simi Valley East

Chatsworth Peak is a peak in the Simi Hills overlooking (to the east) Chatsworth and the western San Fernando Valley, in Los Angeles, Southern California. It is southwest of Santa Susana Pass and north of the Chatsworth Reservoir.

Chatsworth Peak has an elevation of 2,313 feet (705 m).

Nearby are Simi Peak in the western Simi Hills, and Oat Mountain in the Santa Susana Mountains.

== See also ==
- Santa Susana Pass State Historic Park
- Index: Simi Hills
