= Rancho El Escorpión =

Land grant in California

Coordinates: 34.200°N 118.650°W

Rancho El Escorpión was a 1,110-acre (4.5 km^{2}) Mexican land grant in present-day Los Angeles County, California, given in 1845 by Governor Pío Pico to three Chumash Native Americans - Odón Chijulla, Urbano, and Mañuel. The half league square shaped Rancho El Escorpión was located at the west end of the San Fernando Valley on Bell Creek against the Simi Hills, and encompassed parts of present-day Calabasas, California, West Hills (previously Owensmouth and Canoga Park) and Woodland Hills.

== History ==
A former Fernandeño (Native American) village in this area was called Atɨ́'vsɨng, which means "scorpions" in the Fernandeño dialect of the Tongva language. This is where the name Rancho El Escorpión comes from in Spanish (Scorpion Ranch in English). A peak in the area was also called kas’élewun, which means "tongue."

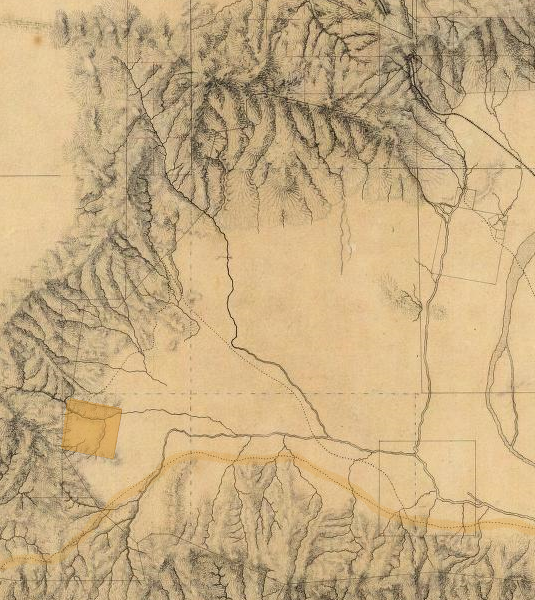
Detail of the southwestern San Fernando Valley, from a manuscript map of Los Angeles and San Bernardino topography, 1880, showing Rancho El Escorpión (shaded area, added).

Chumash-Ventureño Chief Odón Eusebia (1795–), his son-in-law Urbano (1799–), and Urbano's son Mañuel (1822–), were the grantees of Rancho El Escorpión, formerly San Fernando Mission (Mission San Fernando Rey de España) lands. Urbano Chari was one of just three Indians listed in the 1850 who owned valuable real estate. His farm was valued at $500. Urbano Chari jointly owned Rancho El Escorpión until his death about 1860. According to a historical summary in an application for federal recognition filed by the Fernandefio Tataviam, "The expression Chari meant that Urbano was the headman of his lineage community, Siutcabit."

Joaquín Romero (1821–), the son of Domingo Romero, who was an overseer at San Fernando Mission from 1816 to 1820, received the El Escorpión de las Salinas rancho lands (non-land grant) from the Mission. He obtained a 5/12 section of land which lay adjacent to Rancho El Escorpión on the northern side (now the Chatsworth Reservoir area).

Odón and Juana Eusebia's daughter, Maria del Espíritu Santo Chijulla (1821–1906), married José Antonio Menéndez (m.1856–1859. In 1857 they had a son, Juan José Menéndez (1857–c.1923).

With the cession of California to the United States following the Mexican-American War, the 1848 Treaty of Guadalupe Hidalgo provided that the land grants would be honored. As required by the Land Act of 1851, a claim for Rancho El Escorpión was filed with the United States Public Land Commission in 1852, and the grant was patented to Odón Eusebia, Urbano, and Mañuel in 1876.

Miguel Leonis (1824–1889) was born in Basque Cambo-les-Bains-in the Pyrénées-Atlantiques, a traditional French département in the southwest of France. Fleeing prosecution there, he immigrated to Los Angeles in 1854, and was naturalized in 1867. He first worked as a sheepherder for Joaquín Romero at Rancho El Escorpión de las Salinas. Later in the 1850s Romero sold his property to Leonis.

In 1871, Miguel Leonis acquired Odón Chijulla's holdings of Rancho El Escorpión, along with an adobe on ranch lands in Calabasas adjacent along the southern boundary. He used the land for cattle and sheep herds. Today, the adobe structure, known as Leonis Adobe, still exists as a working museum.

Leonis took control of the rancho and added land by bullying, litigating, or buying up homesteaders. Though illiterate and only speaking Basque, he was often in court, with over thirty property disputes recorded. He hired Mexican and Malibu Chumash gunmen to expand his lands by threatening homesteaders and squatters. In 1875, a dispute between Leonis and ex-Civil War soldier homesteaders resulted in a violent confrontation that raged on for two weeks through what is now Hidden Hills. In the 1870s he became feared and respected, known as the "King of Calabasas," "Miguel Grandé," and "El Basque Grandé." In the 1880s his power diminished "from drought, taxes, drought, cattle rustlers, and losing court battles." Miguel Leonis died in 1889 in the Cahuenga Pass, returning alone from court in Los Angeles when his wagon ran over him.

In his will, Leonis left the bulk of his estate to his siblings, a brother in Los Angeles and the rest in France, and denied that Espíritu was his wife. He described her there as "for many years my faithful housekeeper" and left her $5,000 while the estate was worth approximately $300,000. In an 1887 court document he had claimed marriage. Espiritu contested the will and filed a motion for half of the Leonis estate. The complicated case went to the California Supreme Court three times over sixteen years. Her Attorney was Major Horace Bell (1839–1918), also her neighbor who owned the land where Rancho El Escorpión's misplaced adobes were built in the 1840s. In 1905 the final verdict declared the marriage legal, making Espíritu the first common-law spouse to win legal rights in the state, and she inherited the rancho. However Maria del Espíritu Santo died a few months later in 1906.

Her son and daughter-in-law, Juan José Menéndez (more commonly known by the surname, Melendrez) and Juana Valenzula de Menéndez, then inherited the property. In 1912 they sold Rancho El Escorpión, still 1,110 acres (4.5 km^{2}), to George Platt. He established a dairy operation on renamed Platt Ranch variously called Ferndale, ‘escorpion’, or Cloverdale Dairy. The land was not incorporated into the city of Los Angeles until 1958, and Rancho El Escorpión remained open and undeveloped until 1960.

== See also ==
- History of the San Fernando Valley to 1915
- Leonis Adobe
- Ranchos of California
- List of Ranchos of California
- Ranchos of Los Angeles County
