= Plummer Park =

Park in West Hollywood, California, United States

Coordinates: 34.0931°N 118.3511°W

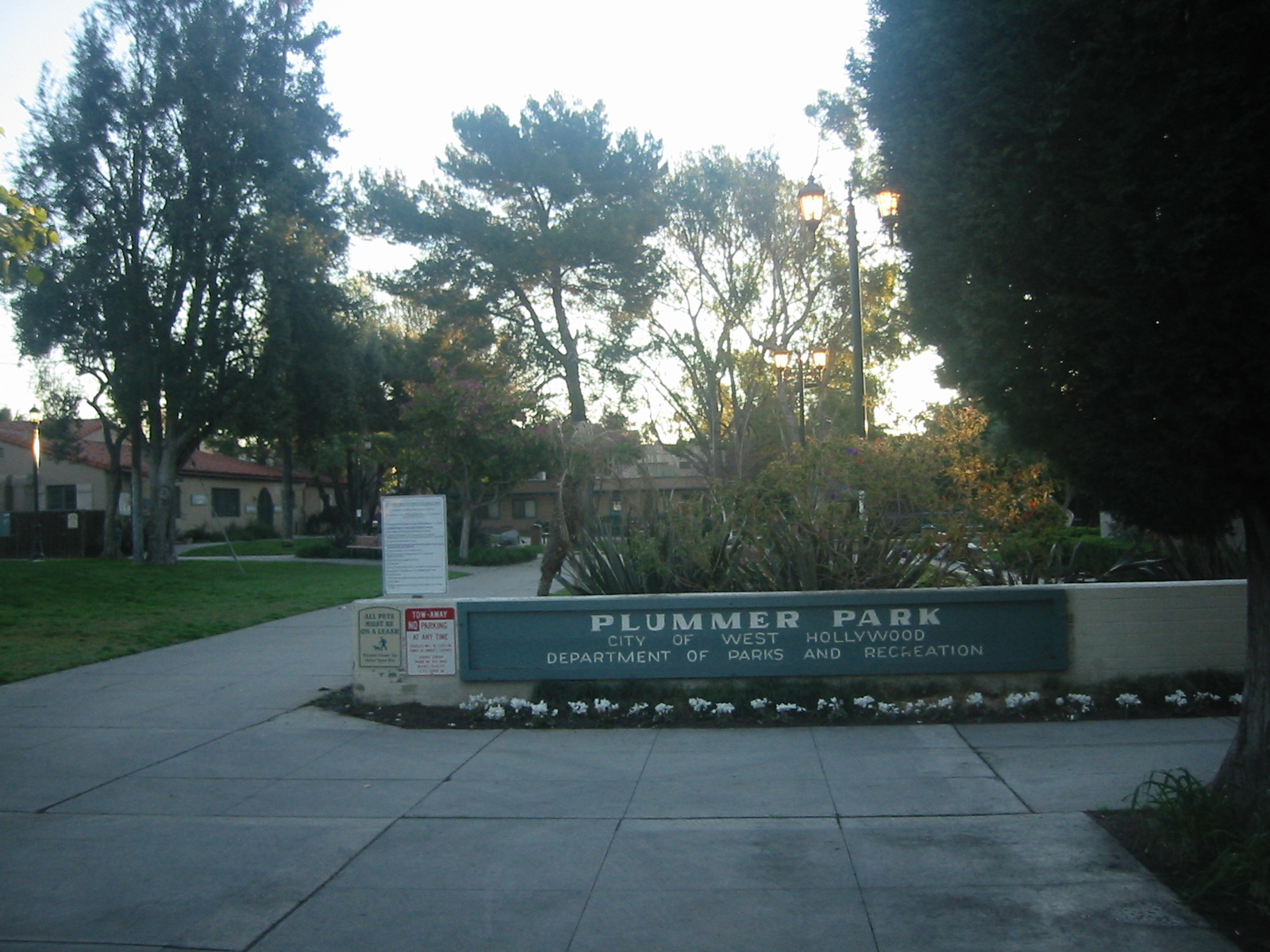
- Plummer Park entrance.
- Interactive map of Plummer Park
- Location: 7377 Santa Monica Boulevard, West Hollywood, California
- Owned by: City of West Hollywood
- Administered by: Department of Facilities and Recreation Services (Recreation Services Division)
- Website: Plummer Park

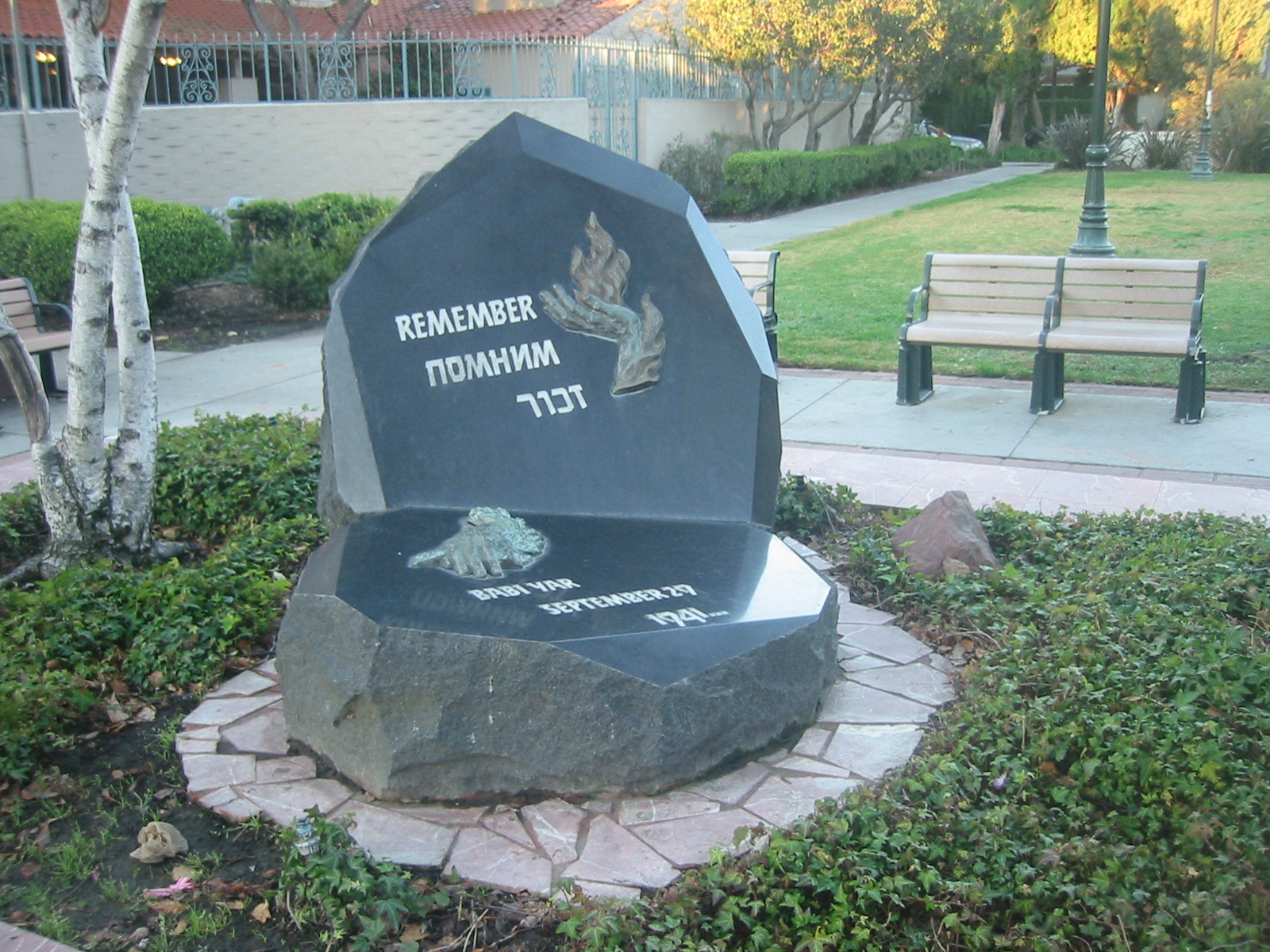
Monument to the victims of Babij Yar Massacre

Plummer Park is a park in West Hollywood, California, United States, on the eastern side of the city. The park is between Santa Monica Boulevard and Fountain Avenue, bordered by North Vista Street and North Fuller Avenue, 6 blocks west of La Brea Avenue.

The east side of West Hollywood is dominated by Russian speaking immigrants, and the park is a popular gathering place for Russians.

== History ==
In 1874, Col. Eugenio Plummer acquired official title to 160 acres (65 ha) from Señora Francisca Perez, who had occupied this land under preemption law in 1869.

Plummer Park and Plummer House were acquired by Los Angeles County from Senor Plummer in 1937 for $15,000. The Los Angeles Audubon Society (LAAS) has been headquartered in Plummer House since then and (in 1983) moved into another building in Plummer Park (Great Hall-Long Hall) which was originally constructed by the Works Progress Administration (WPA) in 1937.

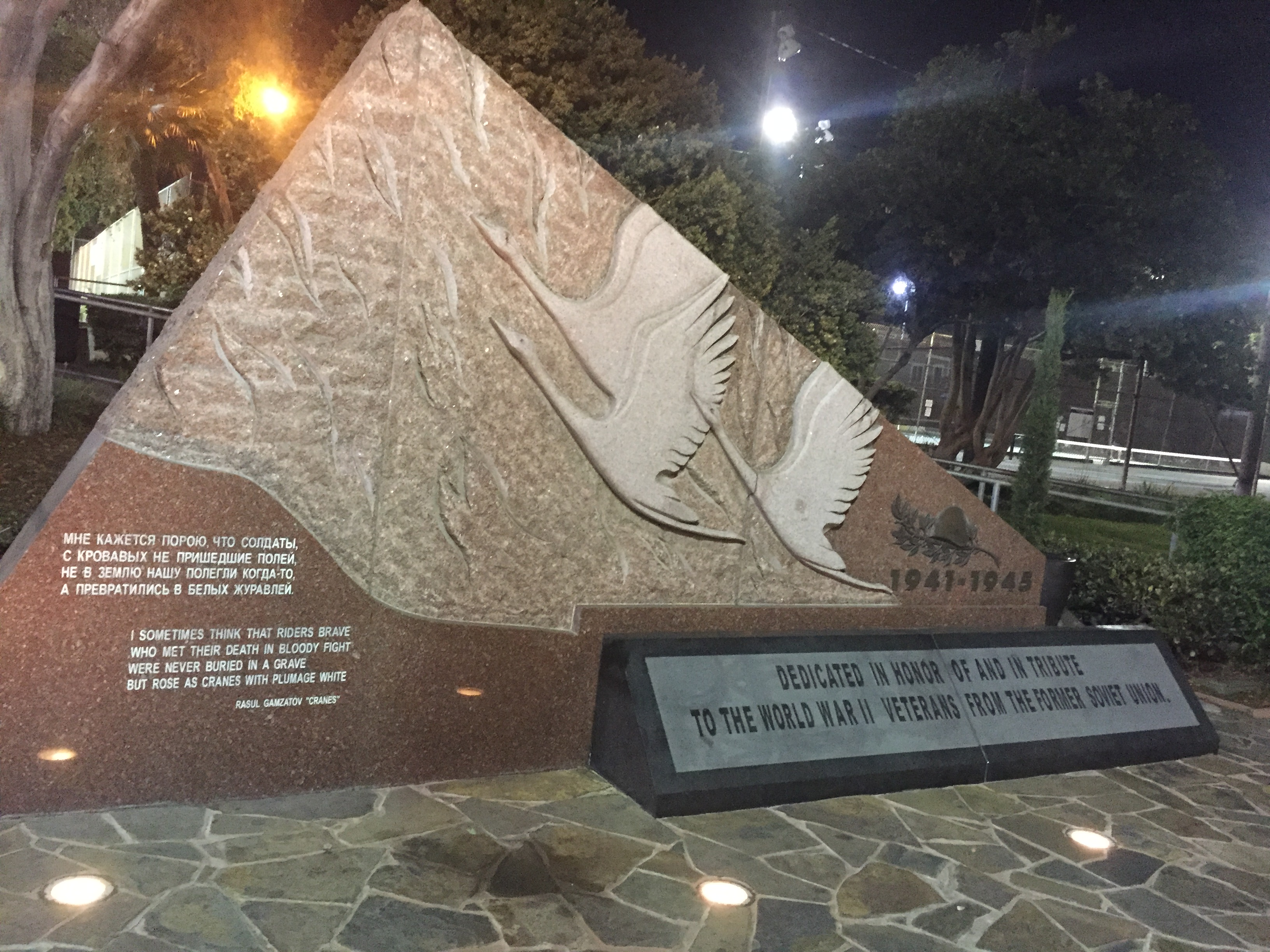
World War II memorial for veterans from the former Soviet Union.

In popular culture, alternative rock singer Michael Knott, features Plummer Park as the setting for his song “Bubbles” on his album Rocket and a Bomb. "Song Lyrics Bubbles". July 2025.

In 2005, a Russian Veterans Memorial was built in the park. While supported by many local residents, it was criticized as being inappropriate given that some might interpret it as honoring the USSR under Joseph Stalin.

In May 2011 the Audubon Society was given notice to leave by the city of West Hollywood who are planning to demolish the building in 2012 and create underground parking as part of a controversial plan to create a modern park. A group of residents called Protect Plummer Park was organized in early 2011 to preserve the historic Plummer Park.

=== Designations ===
Plummer Park and Plummer House (which was built in 1870 and moved to the Leonis Adobe grounds in Calabasas in 1983) have been designated a State Historic Landmark by the State of California in 1956.

On May 1, 2013, the California Historic Resources Commission vote to approve the nomination to place the Great Hall-Long Hall in the National Register of Historic Places, despite opposition from the City Council of West Hollywood.

== Amenities ==
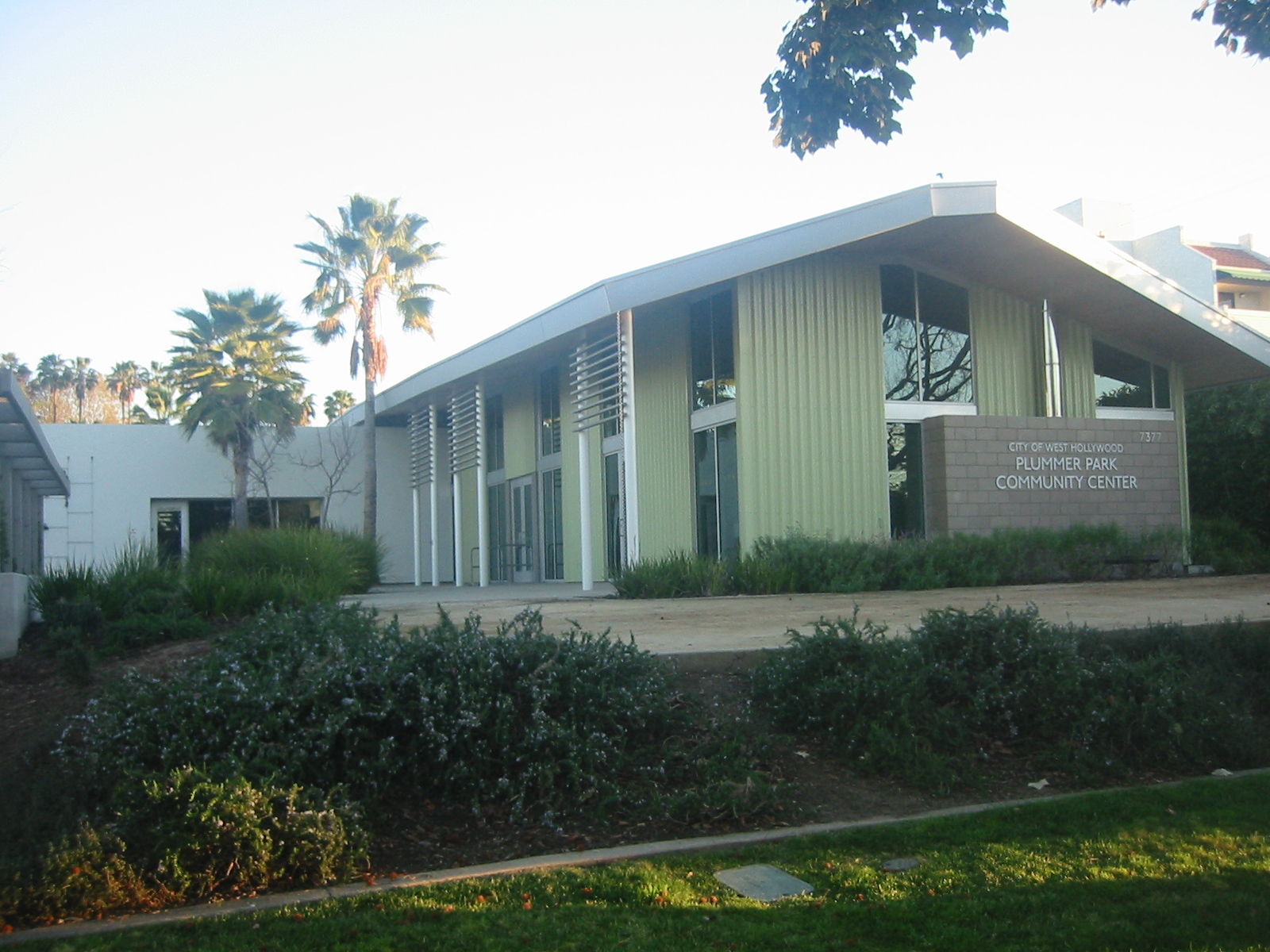
Community Center in Plummer Park, completed in 2001 and designed by Koning Eizenberg Architecture

There is a farmers' market every Monday morning in the north parking lot. In 2001 a new community center was completed on the site designed by Koning Eizenberg Architecture, Inc. (see photograph).

It currently hosts the Los Angeles Sunday Assembly.

== See also ==
- Plummer House
