= Espíritu Chijulla =

Indigenous Californian (c. 1836–1906)

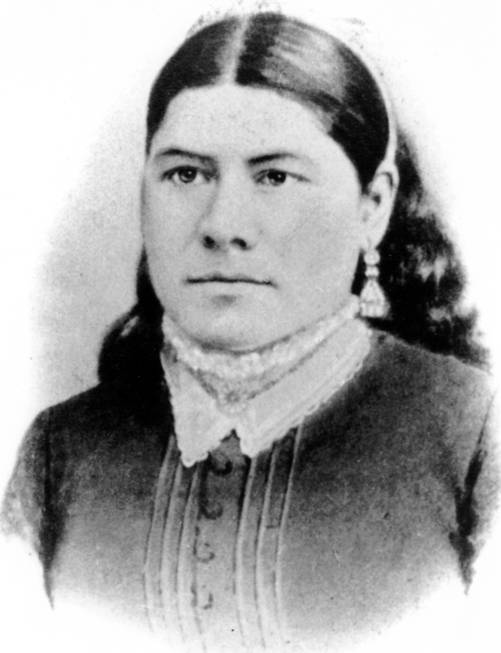
- Espíritu Chijulla in the 1860s.
- Born: María del Espíritu Santo Chijulla c. 1836; San Fernando Valley, Las Californias, Mexico
- Died: May 10, 1906 (aged 69–70); San Fernando Valley
- Resting place: San Fernando Rey de España Mission; 34°16′27″N 118°27′43″W
- Other names: Espíritu Menéndez; Espíritu Leonis
- Spouse: José Antonio Menéndez (m. 1856; died 1859)
- Partner(s): Miguel Leonis (1859; died 1889)
- Children: Juan José Menéndez Marcelina Leonis

María del Espíritu Santo Chijulla, also known as Espíritu Chijulla (also spelled Chihuya), was an Indigenous Californian woman who became the first common-law spouse to win legal rights in California and inherited Rancho El Escorpión.

== Chijulla Family ==
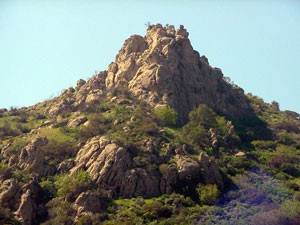
Kas'ele'ew Peak, below which was the village of Hukxa'oynga or Hu'wam where Rancho El Escorpión was established.

Her father was Odón Chijulla, a Chumash man Humaliwo who had been baptized at the San Fernando Rey de España Mission and was considered a leader (or chief) of the Fernandeños living in the western portion of the San Fernando Valley. While Odón was born in Humaliwo, his father had apparently been from the village at the base of Kas'ele'ew Peak known as Hukxa'oynga in Fernandeño-Tongva and Hu'wam in Ventureño Chumash; this village would later become the site of Rancho El Escorpión.

Her mother was Odón's wife, Juana Eusebia, a Tongva woman from a village near Santa Monica (possibly Guashna, Kuruvunga, or Topanga). Odón and Juana Eusebia had three daughters, Marcelina, María Dolores, and María del Espíritu and two sons, Bernabé and Tiburcio. Most of their children continued to remain associated with the Rancho El Escorpión land owned by Odón.

Marcelina married Urbano Chari a Fernandeño who became co-owner of the Rancho El Escorpión grant with her father; she later lived with Joaquín Romero who was also a partial owner of the rancho. María Dolores was first married to a Fernandeño named José "Polo," and then lived with José Arnaz, recipient of the San Buenaventura Ex-Mission grant, before finally settling down with Pierre Domec, a Frenchman who owned a lime kiln near El Escorpión; her eldest daughter María del Rosario married Carlos Leboubon, a Frenchman who worked for Domec. Leboubon won a court battle against Domec, after which he and María del Rosario settled near Saticoy. María Dolores's youngest daughter, María Antonia, married Francisco More who was of half indigenous and half Euroamerican ancestry who had been raised at Saticoy. Bernabé first married a Tataviam and Kitanemuk (or Kawaiisu) woman named Teodora; after her death he married Marta, a Tataviam/Fernandeña woman. He and Marta split and he continued to live in El Escorpión where he married Dolores, possibly the granddaughter of Urbano Chari. Bernabé eventually died by suicide when he hanged himself at the San Fernando Mission. Tiburcio had married an indigenous woman named Manuela and had two children, but no other records of his family past 1860 have been found.

== Biography ==
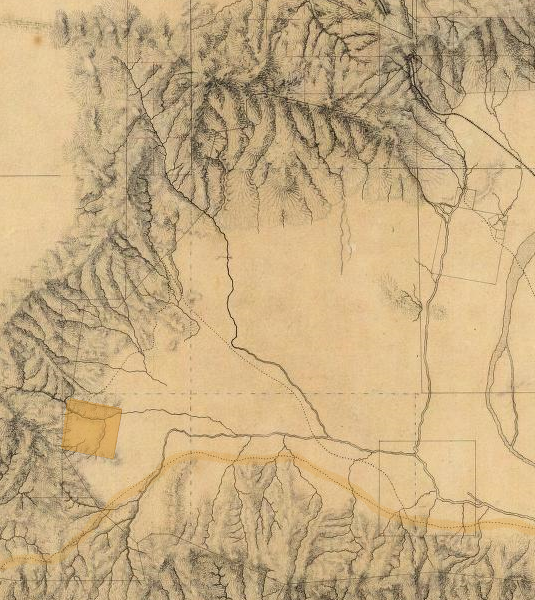
Portion of an 1880 map depicting the western San Fernando Valley, with Rancho El Escorpión highlighted.

María del Espíritu Santo Chijulla, born in 1836, was baptized in the San Fernando Mission. Her father Odón was, most likely, one of the forty petitioners who received a grant from governor Micheltorena on May 3, 1843. This grant was not preserved by governor Pico; however, in July 1845, Odón, his son-in-law Urbano Chari, and Urbano's son Manuel, negotiated joint ownership of a square league of land which became Rancho El Escorpión. Urbano and Manuel died in about 1860, and the El Escorpión land was either sold or lost by the end of the 1860s.

Espíritu Chijulla and her family spoke both Ventureño Chumash and Fernandeño Tongva, having roots in and inhabiting the multilingual community in El Escorpión.

Chijulla married José Antonio Menéndez in 1856 and had a son with him called Juan José Menéndez in 1857. After Menéndez's death, Miguel Leonis partnered with Chijulla in 1859. Leonis was a French-Basque settler who was active in the San Fernando Valley starting from around 1854. Leonis persuaded Odón to transfer the title of his portion of El Escorpión to him under the pretense of protecting the land from government confiscation; he then sold and transferred ownership of the property to Espíritu, never returning it to Odón. Around 1869, Leonis was also able to secure Urbano and Manuel's portions of El Escorpión. By 1871, Leonis had taken possession of Odon's remaining share of the El Escorpión land.

Leonis' relationship with Espíritu was controversial among the local Basque settlers who generally married Anglo-European women. Leonis did not allow Espíritu's son Juan José to live in the same house with them. Espíritu had a daughter with Leonis, Marcelina, in 1860; Marcelina would die of smallpox at 20 years old. In 1880, the couple moved their home three miles south to Calabasas; here, they remodeled an abandoned adobe into a two story adobe. In the early 1880s, Leonis persuaded Horace Bell, an attorney who had been his adversary, to work for him; Leonis began to win more suits against squatters in the lands he owned.

=== Legal battle ===
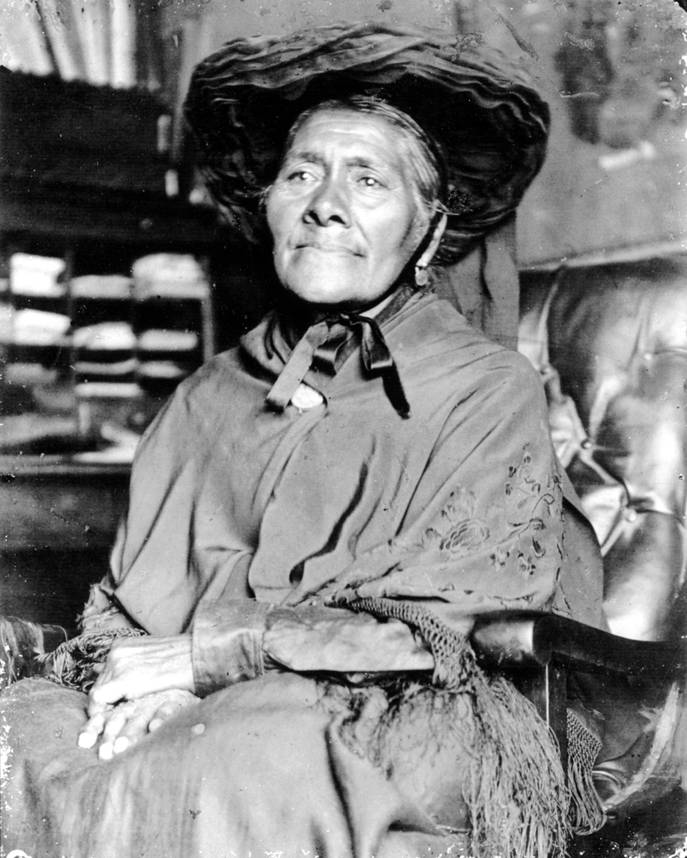
Espíritu Chijulla around 1900.

Leonis died in 1889, after falling from a wagon. Having amassed a worth of over $300,000, he left the majority of his assets to his Basque relatives and only allocated $10,000 to Espíritu who he referred to as his "faithful housekeeper," despite her having been his common-law wife; he further stated that he wanted "to prevent her from being reduced to pennies during her lifetime by reason of her ignorance and inexperience." The Los Angeles Times reported that the local French population was surprised that he left so little to the woman "who has for nearly thirty years been considered his wife."

Espíritu refused the money and challenged the will. She hired Horace Bell and future United States Senator Stephen M. White as her attorneys. Espíritu called 40 witnesses who testified that Leonis had publicly acknowledged her as his wife; she herself testified that she had met Leonis at El Escorpión and lived with him for 30 years, having given him a daughter who died before adulthood. Marcelina's grave was also offered as proof of their relationship. When Espiritu appeared in court dressed in black with mourning veil attached to a black flat straw hat, the Los Angeles Times described her as "a typical Mexican of the original cast," with "a very dark complexion, small black eyes, nose blunt, mouth large and lips tightly compressed when in repose." When an old friend of Leonis reported that Espiritu had previously lived out of wedlock with two other men, the Times reported in detail on the "Sensational Disclosures." After five weeks of testimony, the jury ruled in favor of Espíritu and declared that the long-standing relationship between her and Leonis was legal, making Espíritu the heir to Leonis' $300,000 estate.

After winning this initial case, her legal troubles continued. The estate produced over 100 lawsuits against her. She unknowingly gave power of attorney to a friend who later claimed she owed him $5,000; another sold her cattle and kept the money. Two other men who owed the Leonis estate about $12,000 used her signature on another paper as proof of having repaid her $8,000. She had been put in such a desperate position that "she was at one time reduced to a diet of acorns which she picked up off the ground at her home, her property being so tied up in the courts." She again turned to White and Bell, who had taken half of her estate in payment for their services. The court case went to the state Supreme Court three times. Finally, after 16 years of litigation ending in 1905, Espíritu Chijulla was awarded half of Leonis's land. Espíritu Chijulla died the next year in 1906.

Espíritu left the estate to her son Juan José Menéndez who had her buried in the San Fernando Mission's cemetery next to the mission church; the grave has her name recorded as María Espírito Capigaras Menéndez. He and his wife Juana Valenzuela de Menéndez ended up having to sell the property to George Platt in 1912 and sold the adobe property in 1922 to the Agoure family. Menéndez and his wife, were later interviewed by ethnologists John P. Harrington and his wife Carobeth Laird and helped record several Fernandeño stories, traditions, and place names, many of which had been recounted to them by Espíritu Chijulla herself. Horace Bell's son, Charlie, who continued to live near the El Escorpión land, was also interviewed and added to the ethnography.

== See also ==
- Mission San Fernando Rey de España
- Rancho El Escorpión
- Leonis Adobe
- Victoria Reid
