= Leonis Adobe =

Historic house in California, United States

Coordinates: 34.1576°N 118.6402°W

- The Leonis Adobe
- U.S. National Register of Historic Places
- Los Angeles Historic-Cultural Monument
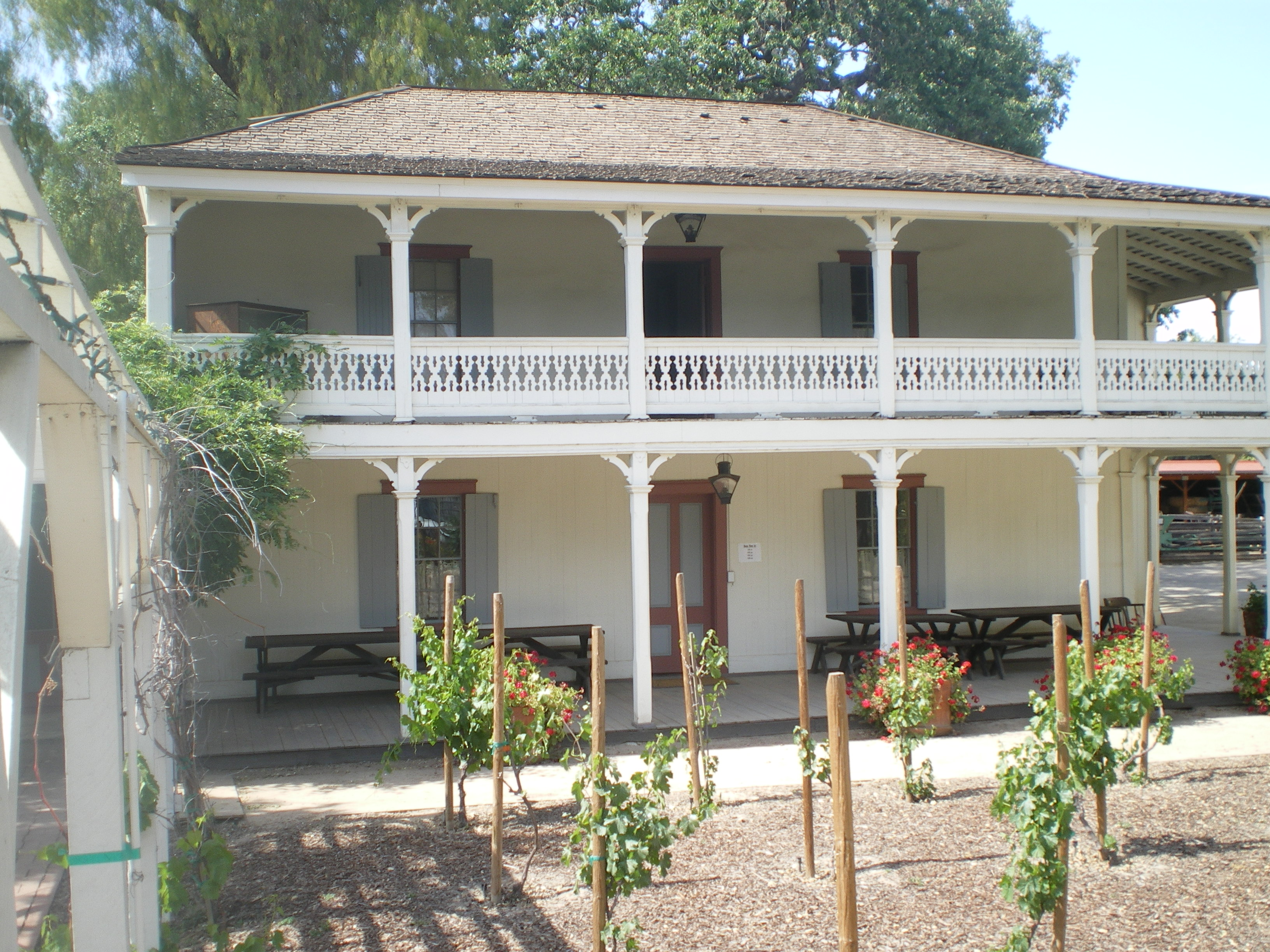
- The Leonis Adobe, 2008

- Location within the Los Angeles metropolitan area Location within California Location within the United States
- Location: 23537 Calabasas Rd., Calabasas, California
- Built: 1844
- Architectural style: Monterey Colonial, Adobe, Queen Anne
- NRHP reference No.: 75000433
- LAHCM No.: 1

Significant dates
- Added to NRHP: May 29, 1975
- Designated LAHCM: August 6, 1962

The Leonis Adobe is a historic adobe located in what is now Calabasas, California. One of the oldest surviving private residences in Los Angeles County and one of the oldest surviving buildings in the San Fernando Valley, it was built in 1844 and was occupied by the wealthy rancher Miguel Leonis (October 20, 1824 – September 20, 1889) until his death. Afterward, the property was the subject of a legal dispute between his common-law wife, Espiritu Chijulla (1836 – May 10, 1906); heirs; and a daughter born out of wedlock. The dispute lasted more than 15 years in the courts.

In 1961, the adobe had fallen victim to vandalism, and its owner applied for a permit to raze the structure and erect a supermarket in its place. Preservationists succeeded in having the adobe declared Los Angeles Historic-Cultural Monument #1 in 1962, saving it from the wrecking ball at the last minute. It was listed on the National Register of Historic Places in 1975.

The adobe was restored and is operated as a living museum.

== History ==
=== Early years ===
The original portion of the adobe dates to 1844, but little is known about its use before it was acquired by Miguel Leonis. Some reports indicate that the adobe served as a stagecoach stop on the Camino Real between Mission San Buenaventura and Mission San Fernando Rey de España.

=== Under Miguel Leonis ===
The adobe was acquired by Miguel Leonis (1824–1889) in the 1850s or 1860s. Leonis was a bearded, 6-foot-4-inch (1.93 m) native of Cambo-les-Bains, a town in the traditional Basque province of Labourd in the French Pyrenees. He controlled much of the west end of the San Fernando Valley and part of Ventura County.

The adobe was built in stages and, by the 1870s, Leonis had extensively enlarged and remodeled the dwelling into the Monterey Colonial-style mansion that remains today. He walled in the upper and lower porches to add more rooms. He added a Queen Anne-style veranda on the front of the house and paneled the walls of the living room.

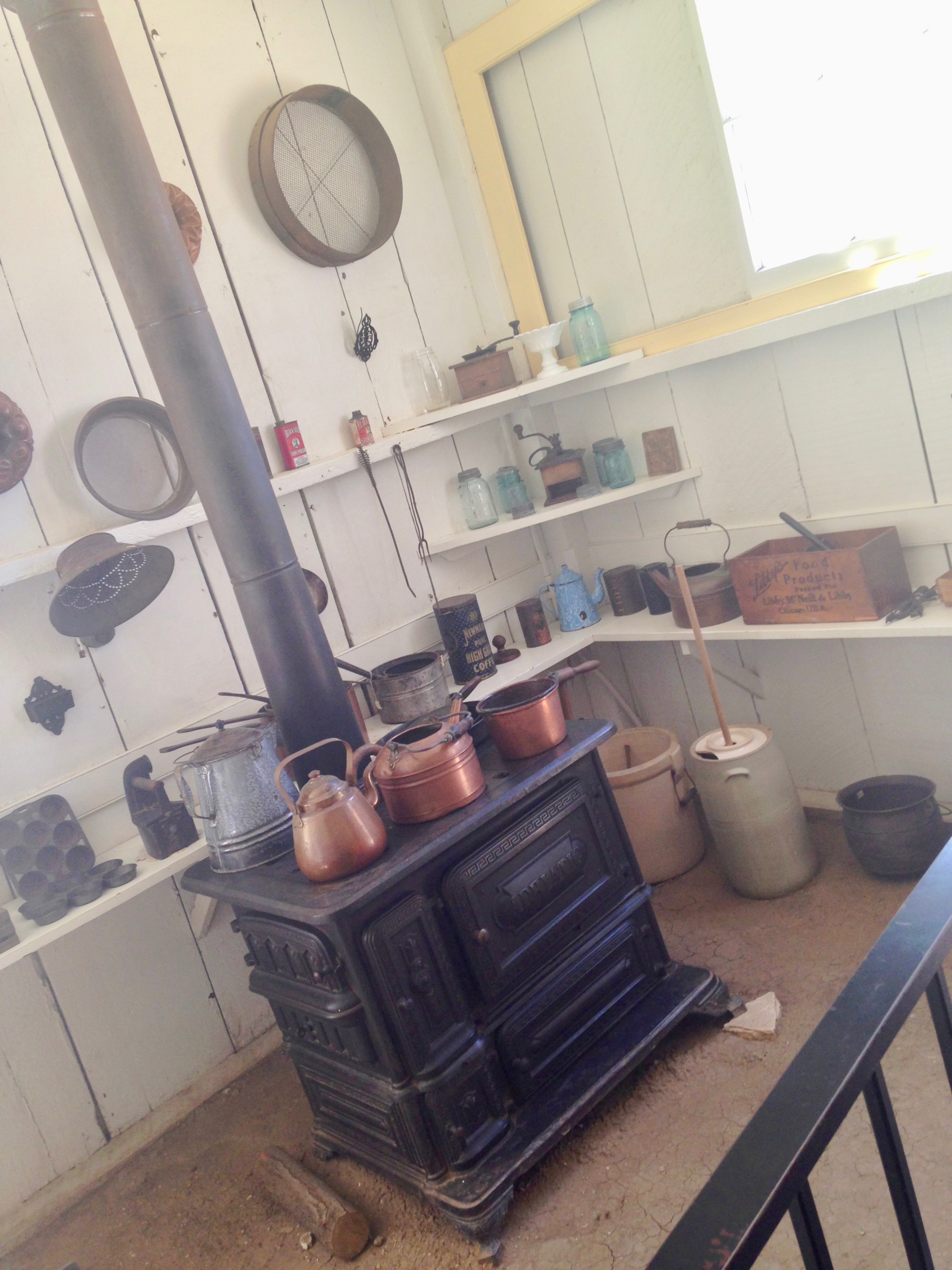
The Leonis Adobe kitchen.

Leonis came to Southern California as "an ignorant Basque sheep herder and blossomed into a robber baron holding feudal sway by the aid of a small army of vaqueros." The first land he acquired was the 1,100-acre (4.5 km^{2}) Rancho El Escorpión, in what is now the West Hills section of Los Angeles. He started as an employee at the ranch and bought half of the ranch from its owner when he became ill. The other half of the ranch was owned by a widowed mission Indian, Espiritu Chujilla. Leonis acquired Espiritu's land by marrying her, though the marriage was later denied by Leonis.

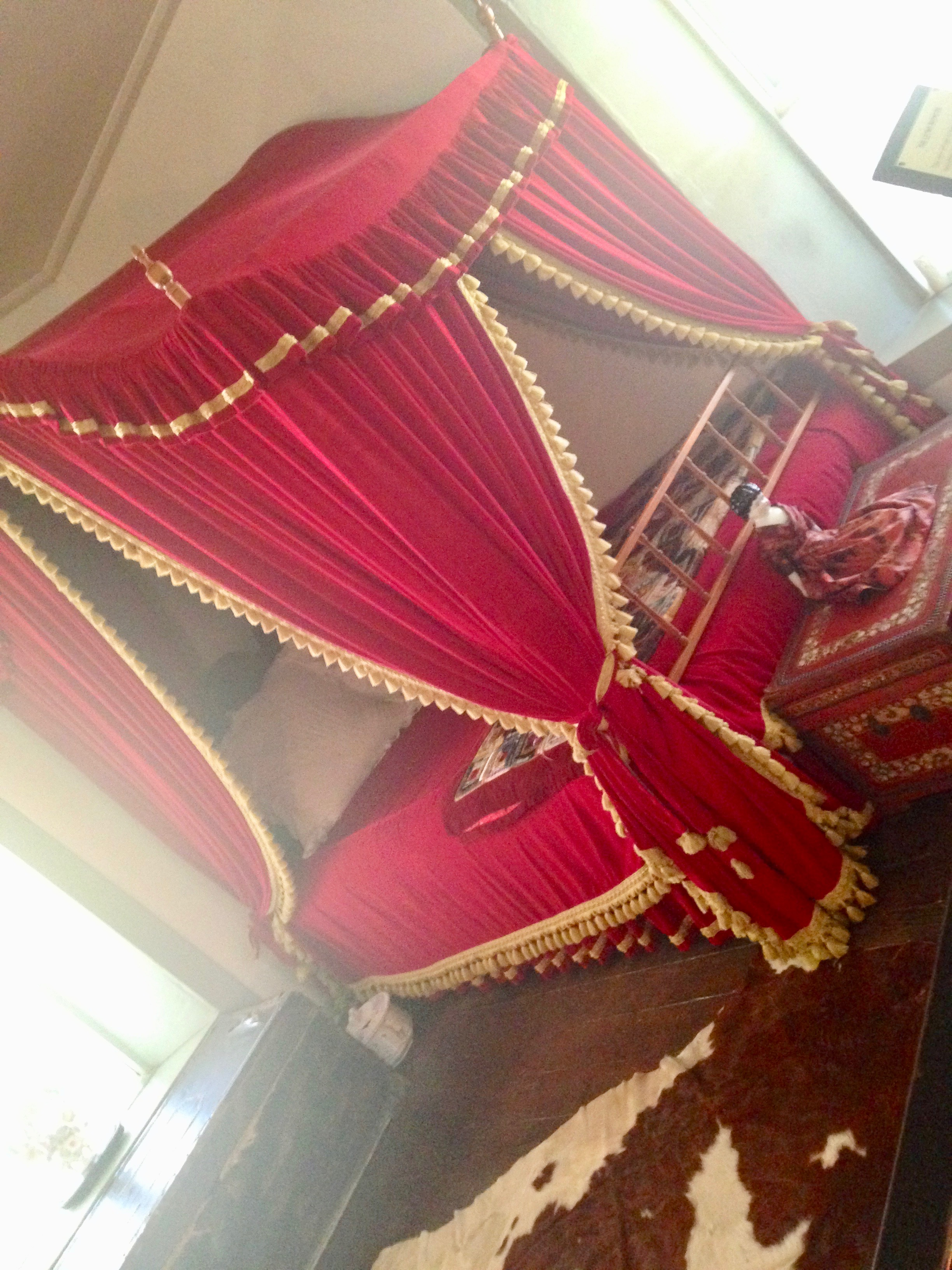
One of the Leonis bedrooms.

He added to his holdings using the California homestead laws. Wherever his livestock grazed, he built a shack and had one of his 100 employees become a "tenant" to support his claim under the homestead law. To prevent competing homestead claims, Leonis and his vaqueros were in constant conflict with squatters. In 1875, a conflict with a group of former Union soldiers who tried to settle on his lands led to two weeks of violence and killings, culminating in a battle in what is now Hidden Hills. It was said that at the time of his death: "His flocks and herds ranged over a hundred hills, and his lands were measured in mileage rather than acres. When he died he left an estate valued at approximately $1,000,000."

=== Espiritu Chujilla and the legal battle over Leonis' estate ===
In 1889, Leonis died from wounds suffered by falling off and being run over by his wagon near Cahuenga, California. The accident was said to have resulted from his unsteady condition after "too free indulgence in sour wine."

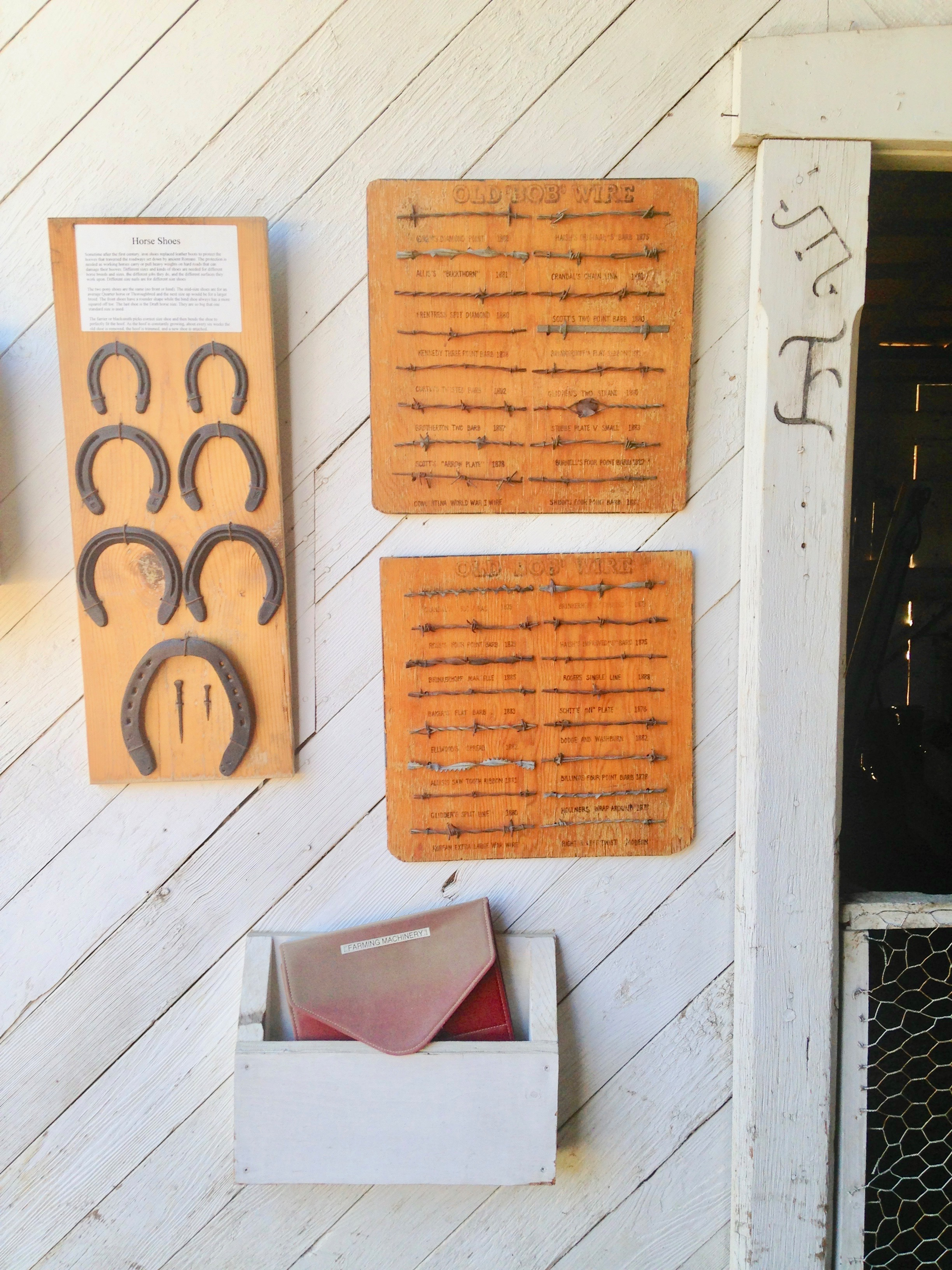
Types of horseshoes and barbed wire on display next to the Leonis Adoble blacksmith shop.

After his death, his will was read, identifying Espiritu Chujilla as his "faithful housekeeper" and leaving her only $10,000 with the balance of his estate going to his siblings. The Los Angeles Times reported that the entire French population was surprised that he left such a small sum to the woman "who has for nearly thirty years been considered his wife."

Espiritu contested the will, and a decade of court battles followed that were covered in detail by the Los Angeles press. At a jury trial in 1891, Espiritu called 40 witnesses who testified that Leonis had publicly acknowledged her as his wife. When Espiritu appeared in court dressed in black with mourning veil attached to a black flat straw hat, the Los Angeles Times described her as "a typical Mexican of the original cast," with "a very dark complexion, small black eyes, nose blunt, mouth large and lips tightly compressed when in repose." When Espiritu took the stand, she testified that she met Leonis at the Escorpion Indian camp in 1859, lived with him for 30 years, and even had a daughter with him who died before adulthood. The grave identifying Leonis as the deceased child's father was offered as proof of their relationship.

When an old friend of Leonis reported that Espiritu had previously lived out of wedlock with two other men, the Times reported in detail on the "Sensational Disclosures." After a five-week trial, the jury took less than a day to return its verdict finding in favor of Espiritu and awarding her one-half of the Leonis estate.

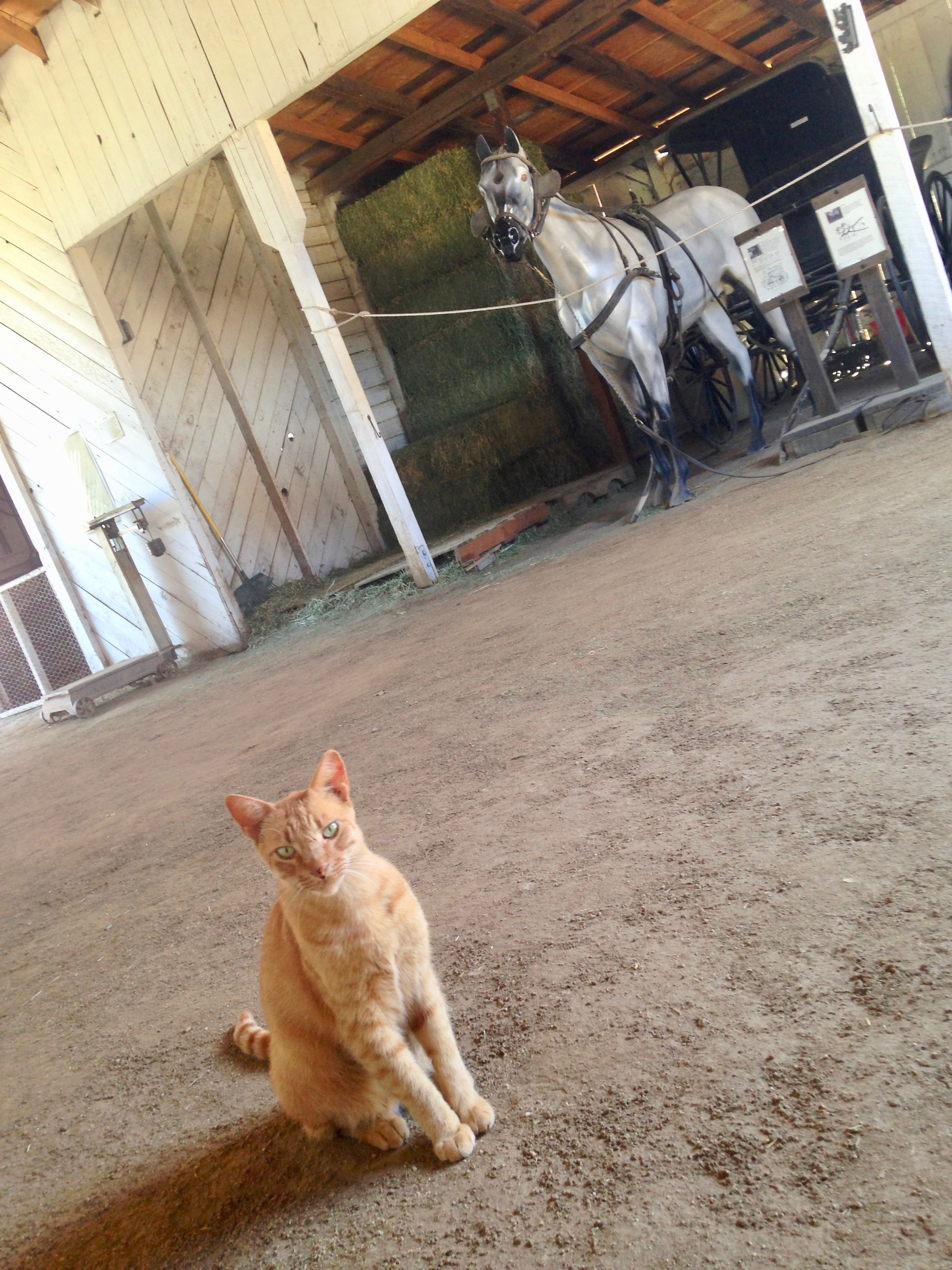
Inside the Leonis Adobe barn.

However, Espiritu's legal troubles continued, as competing claims were made to the lands and swindlers pursued the uneducated Espiritu's money. The estate produced a "hopeless jumble" of over 100 lawsuits and was "rich feeding for many law firms." A young Hollywood tavern owner persuaded Espiritu to appoint him as her agent and to sign a blanket conveyance of all her property to him on the pretense that it would be easier to transact business in his name; further litigation followed to recoup income taken for his own benefit and to contest conveyances and mortgages he had made to others. So completely was Espiritu taken advantage of that "it is said that she was at one time reduced to a diet of acorns which she picked up off the ground at her home, her property being so tied up in the courts."

When the 65-year-old Espiritu married an 18-year-old man, the Los Angeles Times could not restrain itself, noting that her new husband was "barely out of pinafores" and that the "frisky" old woman's "affections appear to have been bubbling at a lively rate, in spite of her well-worn widow's weeds." Litigation over the estate continued until 1905, and Espiritu continued living at the adobe until her death in 1906.

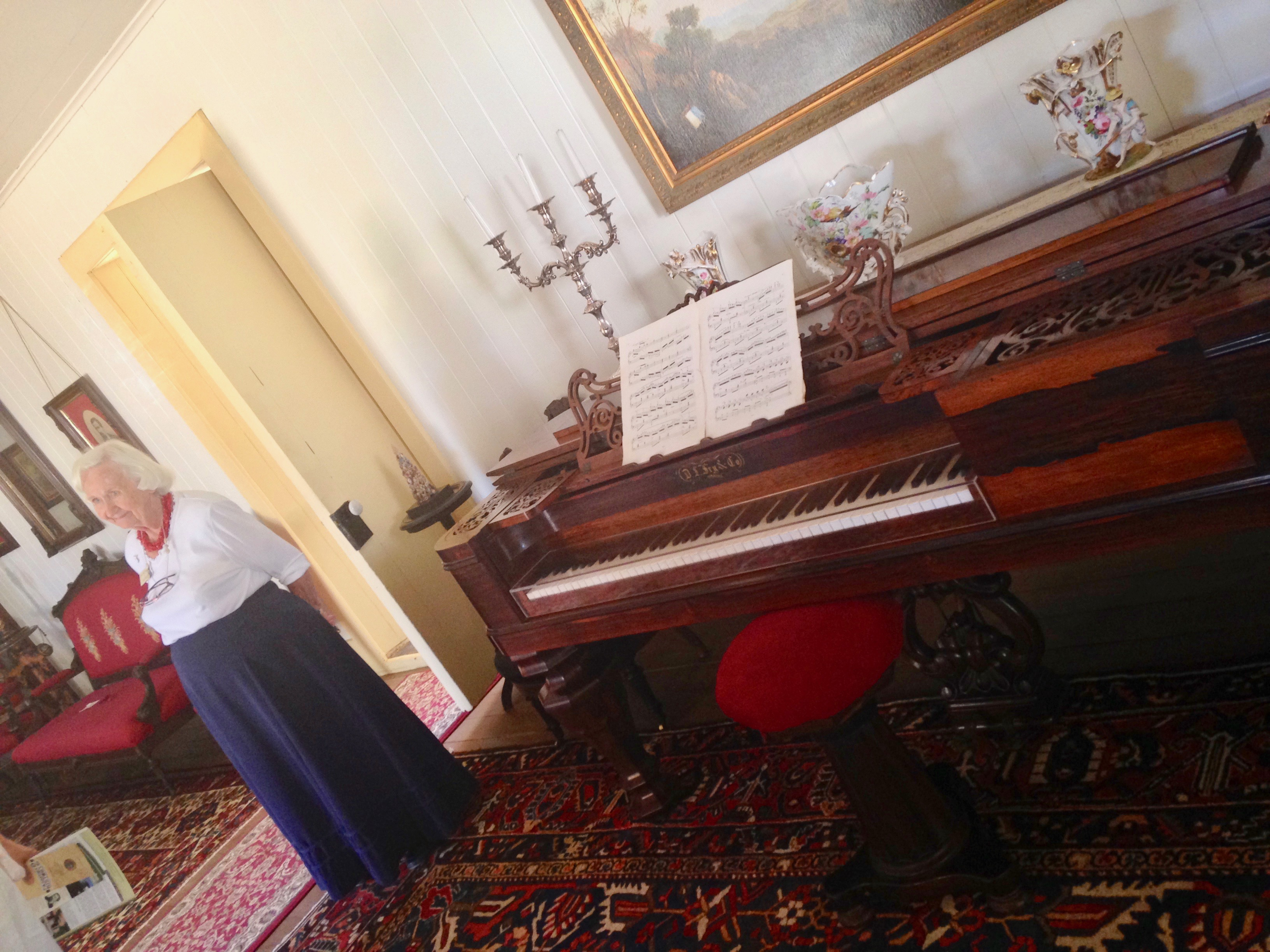
Inside the Leonis Adobe living room.

=== 1910s to 1940s ===
When Espiritu died, her son (by her first marriage), Juan Menendez, moved into the adobe with his family. Menendez built the barn that stands at the back of the adobe. Menendez was a blacksmith who also made wine and built the tank house at the adobe to store it.

Menendez sold the property in 1922 to the Agoure family, for whom the community of Agoura was named. The Agoures remodeled the house in 1920, adding bathrooms and expanding the living room. The Agoures lost the property to foreclosure in 1931, and the adobe was reportedly used as a chicken dinner restaurant and later as a retirement home. In 1962, the Los Angeles Herald-Examiner reported that the last person to reside in the house was motion picture actor John Carradine, who had reportedly moved out of the refurbished adobe several years earlier.

=== Campaign to preserve the adobe ===
Around 1950, the site of the Leonis Adobe, then including 100 acres (0.40 km^{2}), was purchased by the Hidden Hills Corp., the principal sponsor of the Hidden Hills country community. Hidden Hills Corp. subdivided the surrounding 100 acres (0.40 km^{2}) into sites for ranch style homes ranging from 1.5 acres (6,100 m^{2}) to 10 acres (40,000 m^{2}). At the time, A.E. Hanson, president of Hidden Hills Corp., announced plans to restore the adobe.

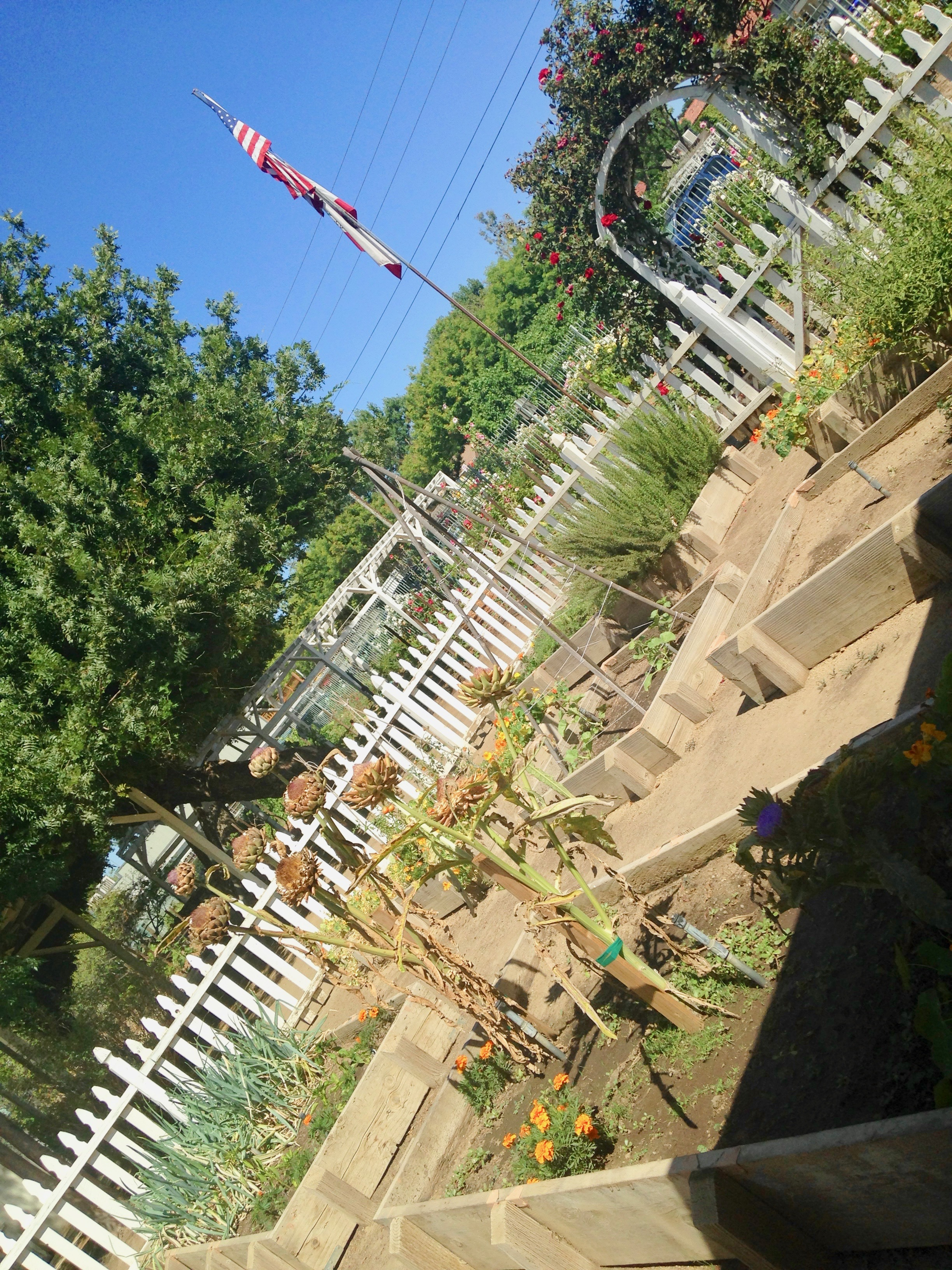
The Leonis Adobe garden.

However, by early 1961, Milton Katz of the Woodland Hills Building and Finance Co. had acquired the adobe and sought to rezone the property to commercial use and to build a shopping center where the adobe sat. Opponents submitted petitions to the City Planning Commission and sought to establish protected landmark status for the property.

While plans to demolish the adobe were pending, it was victimized by vandalism. Windows were smashed, walls and fixtures shattered, floors ripped, handrails on the stairs broken, and doors torn off. The Leonis Adobe Association appealed to the owner to take steps to safeguard the adobe and offered to fence the site at its own expense. Owner Milton Katz declined the offer of fencing and said there was "no need to safeguard the two-story building from vandals because he plans to tear it down as soon as his plans for a supermarket on the site are completed." Though the property had been appraised at $135,000, Katz reportedly wanted $100,000 more than that to sell.

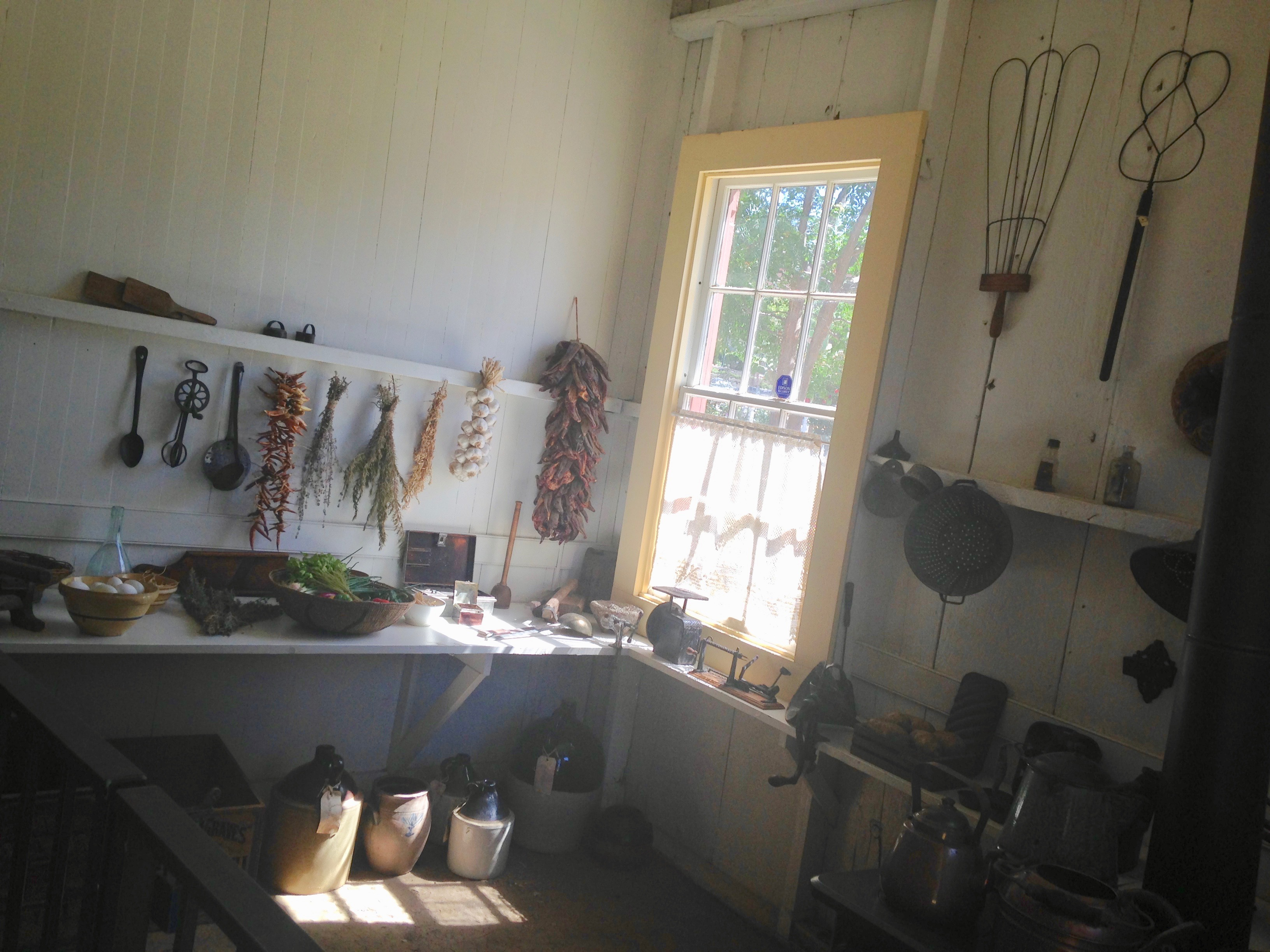
Another view of the Leonis kitchen.

In August 1962, Katz's application to demolish the adobe was denied, and the newly formed City of Los Angeles Cultural Heritage Board designated the adobe as the city's first Historic-Cultural Monument. The debate over preservation of the Leonis Adobe led to a broader discussion about preserving the San Fernando Valley's history, with some opining that "the San Fernando Valley has no historical buildings or landmarks worth preserving."

As efforts proved unsuccessful to find funding to pay the $240,000 demanded by the adobe's owner, Kay Beachy announced in March 1963 that she had paid the requested $240,000 to Milton Katz for the property. Mrs. Beachy agreed to hold the property until the Leonis Adobe Association could buy it from her, and Mayor Sam Yorty presented her with an award for her efforts in saving the adobe.

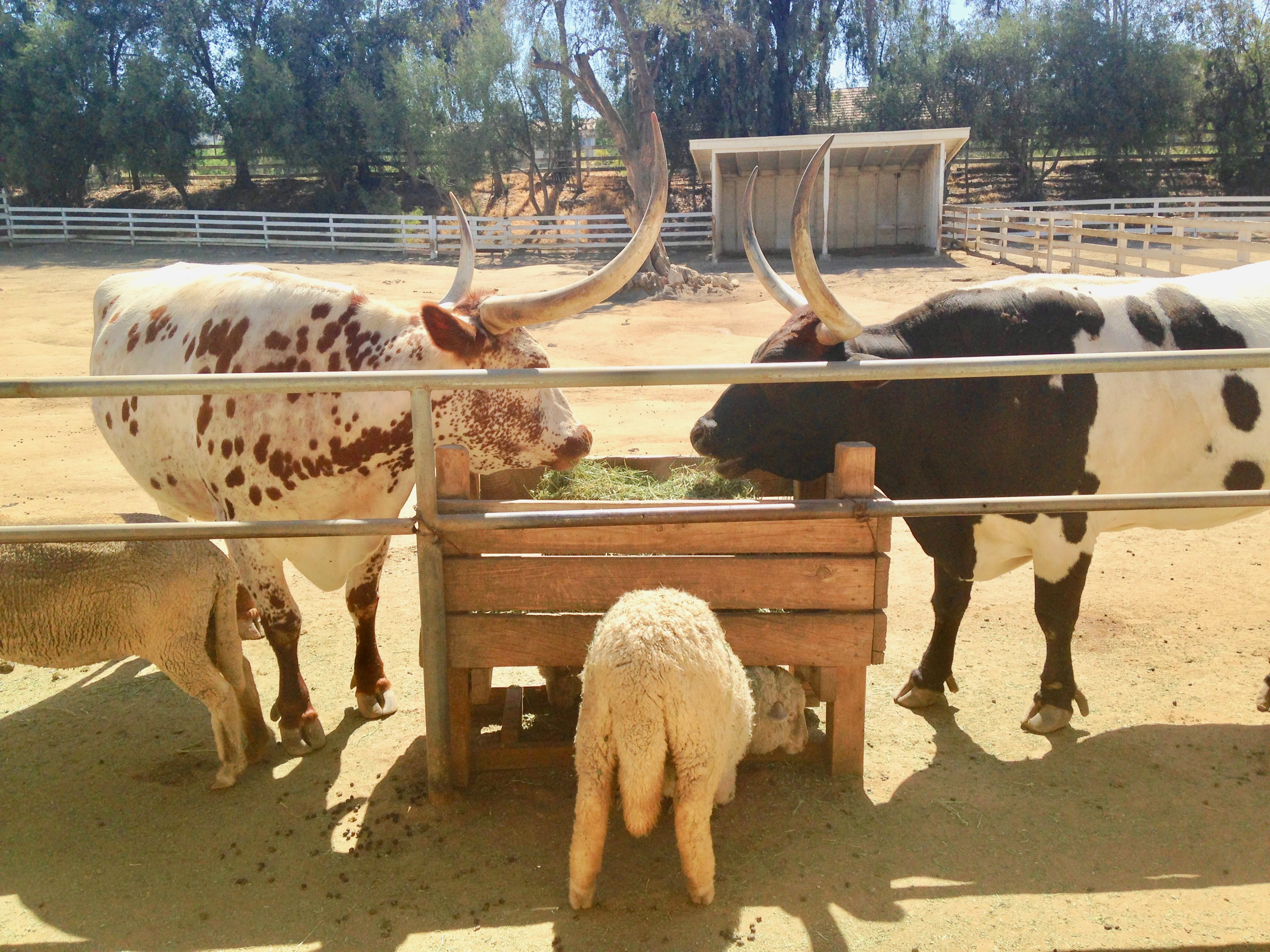
Cattle and sheep are just some of the farm animals to be found at the Adobe.

=== Restoration ===
The Leonis Adobe Association finally collected the funds to purchase the property in 1965. Extensive research was done to restore the adobe to its condition when Miguel Leonis lived there. After the restoration was completed, the adobe was opened to the public in 1966.

== Ghost stories ==
According to legend, the Leonis Adobe is haunted, and was featured in the British paranormal television series Most Haunted in 2005. The first accounts of Leonis' ghost appearing at the adobe came in the 1920s when the first people outside the Leonis family moved into the adobe and began to remodel. According to Leonis' biographer Laura B. Gaye (1905–1981), the new residents heard footsteps on the stairs followed by two loud thuds from the upstairs bedroom resembling the sound of boots dropping to the floor. When the residents went upstairs to investigate, the room was filled with a strong soap aroma, a smell associated with Leonis who always appeared impeccably clean and smelled of soap. The noises continued, and the new owners learned to live with what they concluded was the prior owner's ghost.

According to legend, in the 1930s, a woman who lived there was leaning against a railing that cracked and was pulled back by a ghost, saving her from serious injury. Other stories include a guest at the adobe reportedly seeing an image in the upstairs hallway that spoke in a female voice, "Chichita, Chichita" and thought to refer to the name by which Espiritu's granddaughter reported that her grandmother called her. A young Calabasas resident claimed to see the ghost of Leonis dressed in an old-fashioned coat walking his sheep dog down the street near the adobe. There are tales of people allegedly hearing digging sounds coming from the adobe, where according to legend, Leonis kept his fortune.

== Designation as historic site ==
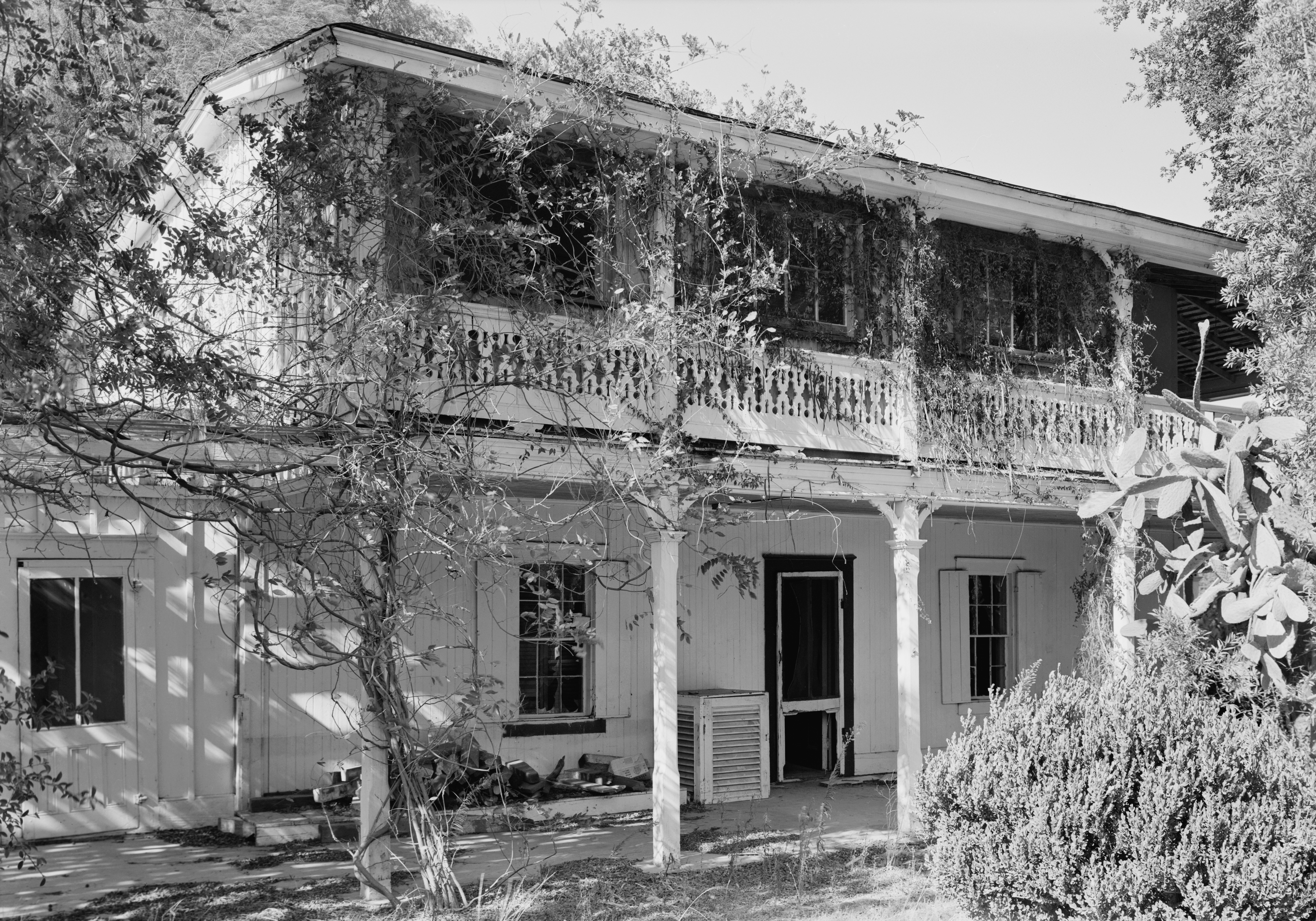
Leonis Adobe, c. 1960

Leonis Adobe is one of only four adobe residences remaining in the San Fernando Valley, with the others being the Los Encinos State Historic Park, Romulo Pico Adobe, and the Lopez Adobe in San Fernando, CA. It has been listed as a historic building at the city and national level as follows:

- When the Los Angeles Cultural-Historical Board was formed in 1962, Leonis Adobe was the first site designated as a Historic-Cultural Monument. By 2007, there were nearly 900 numbered sites that had received the designation, but Leonis Adobe has the prestige of having been designated as Historic-Cultural Monument #1.
- In 1975, the adobe was listed on the National Register of Historic Places.

== Leonis Adobe Museum ==
=== Living History Museum ===
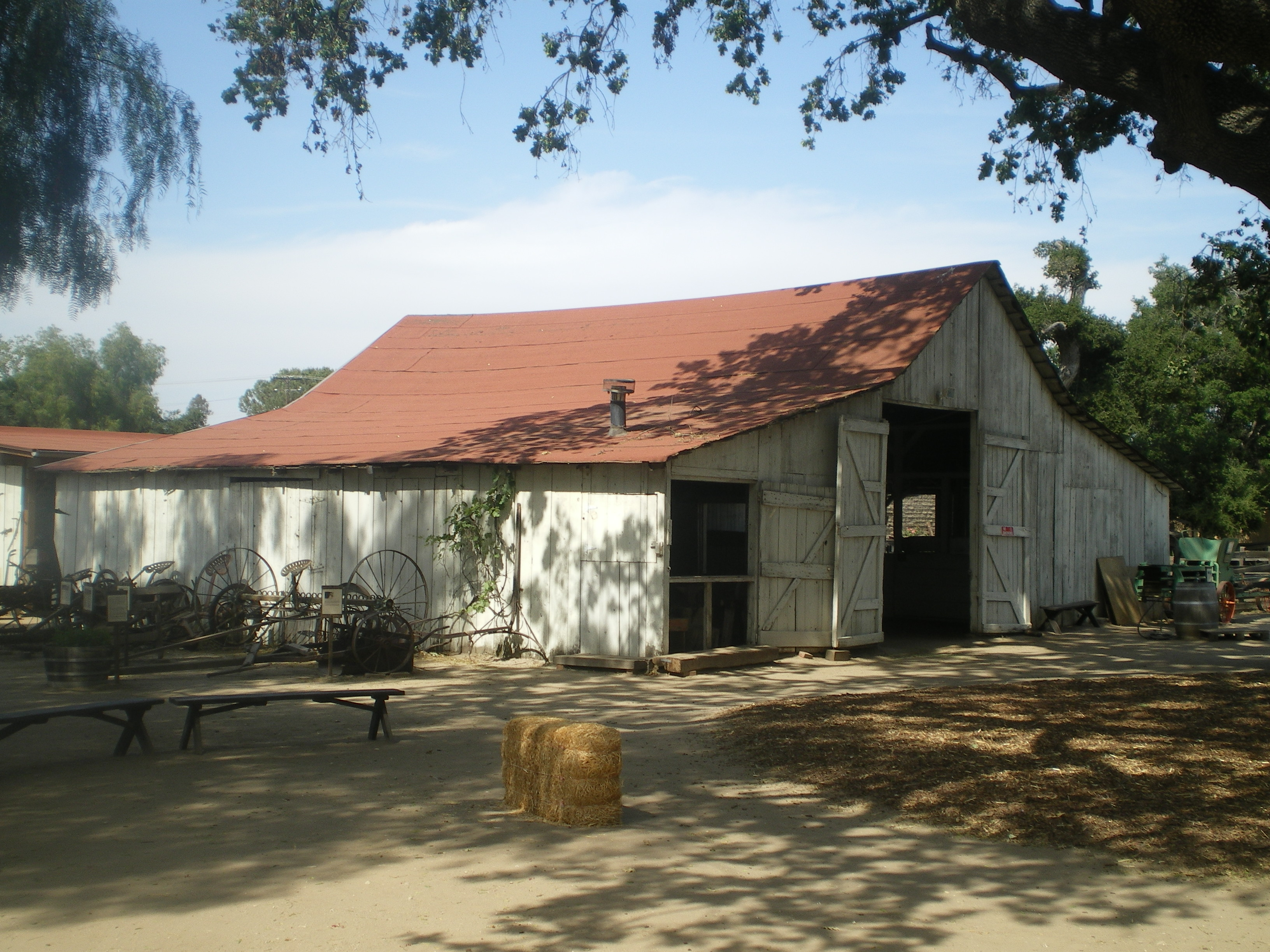
Barn at Leonis Adobe

The Leonis Adobe in recent years has operated as a living history museum to the California ranch style of life. The museum is a popular location for school field trips in which students step back in time to the 1880s by touring the property and participating in recreations of 1880s lifeways. Students are able to pet, feed, and observe ranch animals under supervision of museum tour guides.

=== PBS' Visiting... With Huell Howser ===
In January 2010 Huell Howser spotlighted the Leonis Adobe on his show Visiting... for PBS (a spin-off of his California Gold series). The program featured the grounds, the adobe, the staff, and interviews with several characters at the museum.

=== Plummer House ===
Plummer House
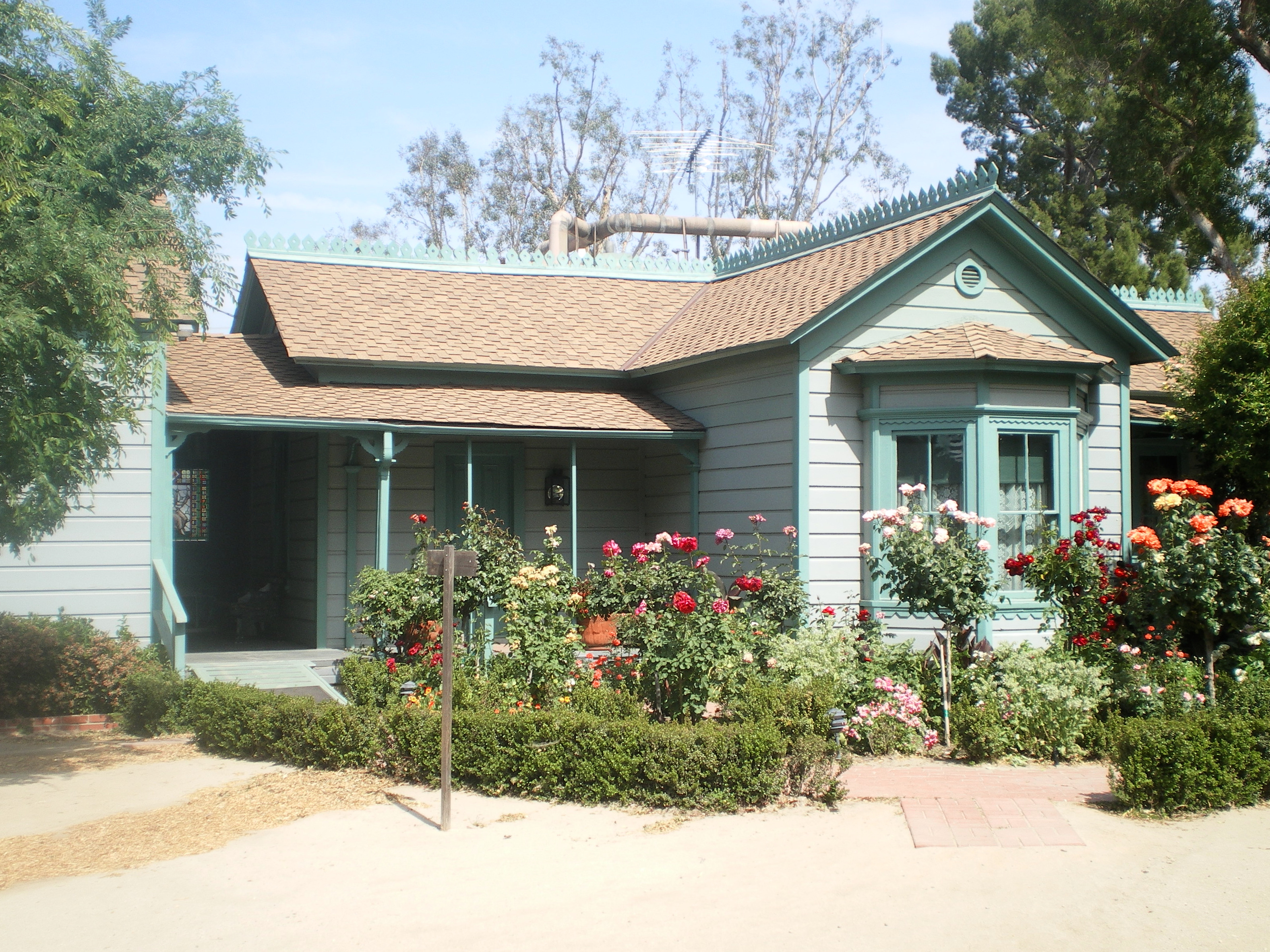
- Plummer House, 2008
- Interactive map of Plummer House

History
- Built: 1874

Site notes
- Architect: Eugene Raphael Plummer

California Historical Landmark
- Designated: January 11, 1935
- Reference no.: 160

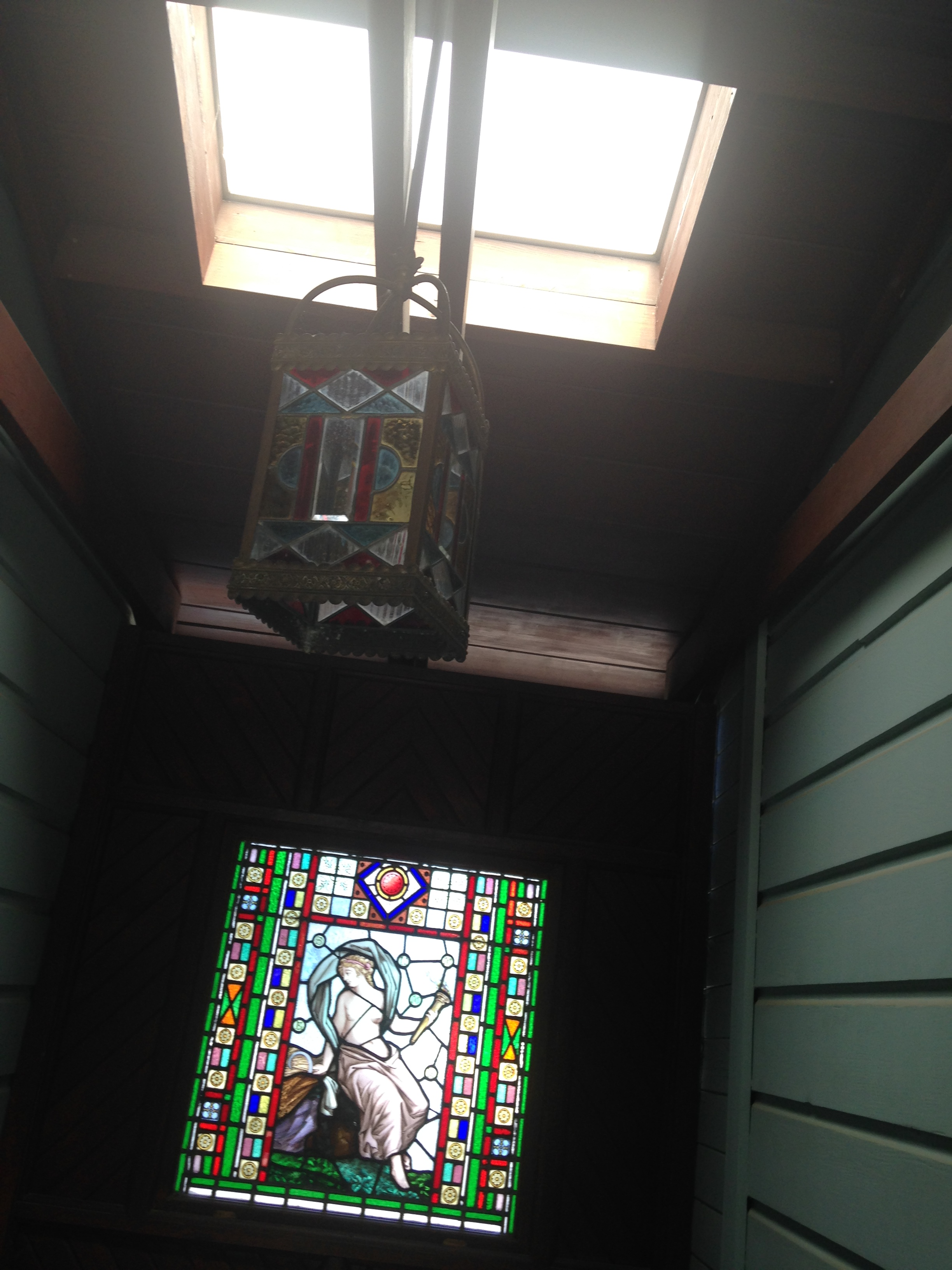
Stained glass at the Plummer House.

In 1983, the Plummer House was moved to the grounds of the Leonis Adobe Museum. The Plummer House was built in 1874 in Plummer Park, West Hollywood by Eugene Raphael Plummer. It was known as the "Oldest House in Hollywood" and was designated as a California Historic Landmark #160 in 1935. It fell into disrepair and was the victim of vandalism and fires. The Leonis Adobe Association in conjunction with the Los Angeles Conservancy arranged with the county to move the front part of the Plummer House to its current location on the Leonis Adobe grounds. The Plummer House has been restored and is used as the visitor center and gift shop for the Leonis Adobe Museum.
