= Old Santa Susana Stage Road =

Historic road between San Fernando and Simi valleys in southern California, US

- U.S. National Register of Historic Places
- Los Angeles Historic-Cultural Monument
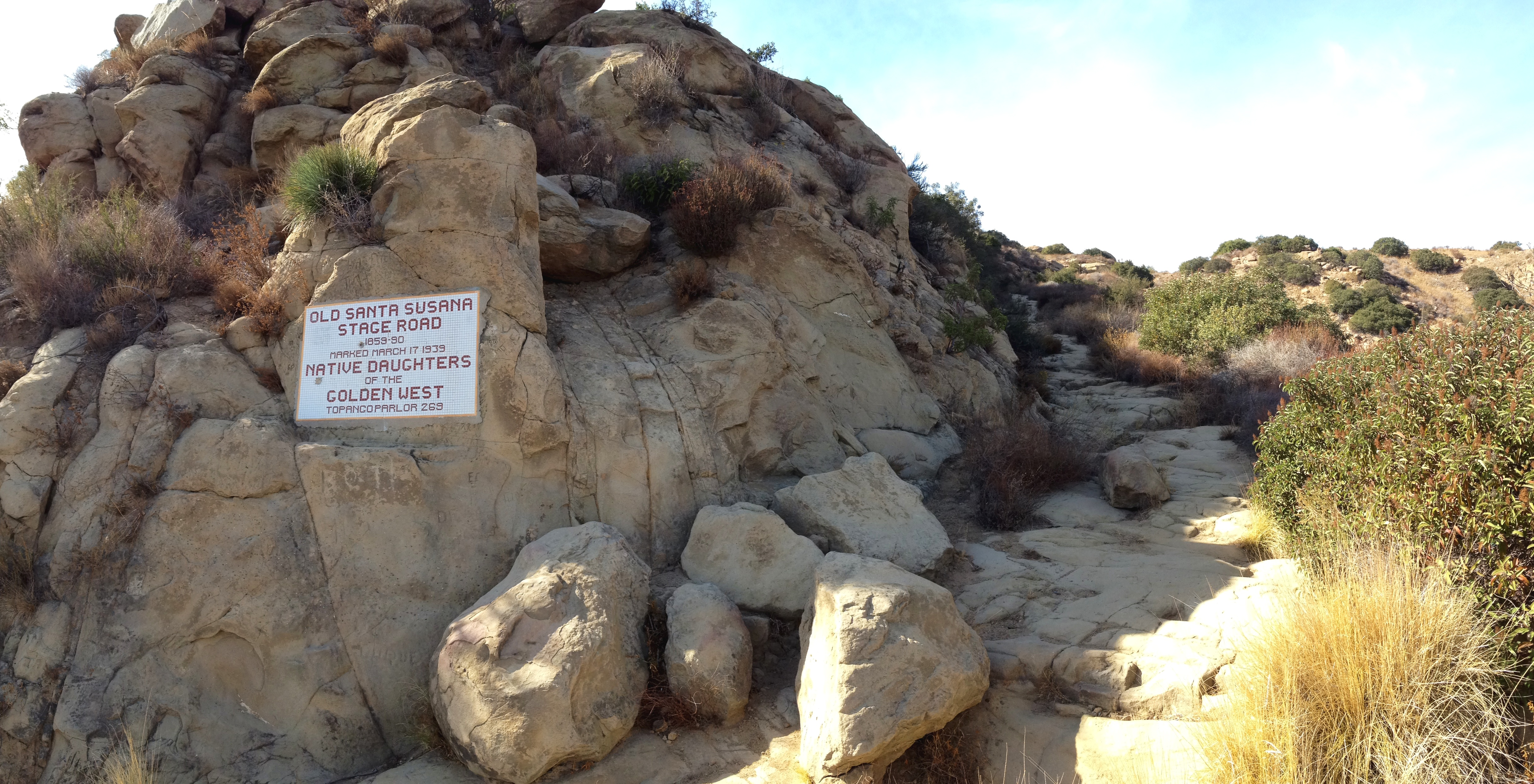
- A mosaic plaque was built in 1939 to commemorate the historic road.
- Nearest city: Chatsworth, California
- Built: 1861
- Architectural style: None
- NRHP reference No.: 74000517
- LAHCM No.: 92

Significant dates
- Added to NRHP: January 10, 1974
- Designated LAHCM: January 5, 1972

The Old Santa Susana Stage Road, or Santa Susana Wagon Road, is a route taken by early travelers between the San Fernando Valley and Simi Valley near Chatsworth, California, via the Santa Susana Pass. The main route climbs through what is now the Santa Susana Pass State Historic Park, with a branch in Chatsworth Park South.

It was an important artery linking the Los Angeles Basin and inland Ventura County and as such, was part of the main route for travel by stagecoach between Los Angeles and San Francisco from 1861 until the opening of rail traffic between the cities in 1876. The Old Santa Susana Stage Road is listed on the National Register of Historic Places. Part of the stage road is also a Historic-Cultural Monument of Ventura County and of the City of Los Angeles under the name Old Stagecoach Trail.

== History ==
In 1859, the California Legislature appropriated $15,000 for improving an old wagon road through the Santa Susana Pass. Additional funding was provided by the Counties of Los Angeles and Santa Barbara. The outbreak of the American Civil War in 1861 disrupted mail service along the Butterfield Overland Mail's southern stagecoach route from St. Louis, Missouri via El Paso, Fort Yuma and Los Angeles and on to San Francisco via the Tejon Pass, which had begun its run in 1858. To compensate, the government contracted the Butterfield Company to carry mail between Los Angeles and San Francisco via the new wagon road over the Santa Susana Pass. The first overland mail stage run through the pass took place on April 6, 1861. The new route diverged from the Tejon Pass route at the north end of the Cahuenga Pass, following the old coast road (El camino Viejo, the former El Camino Real to San Buenaventura (Ventura) and Santa Barbara) as far as the Rancho Los Encinos before striking northwest across the San Fernando Valley toward the Santa Susana Pass.

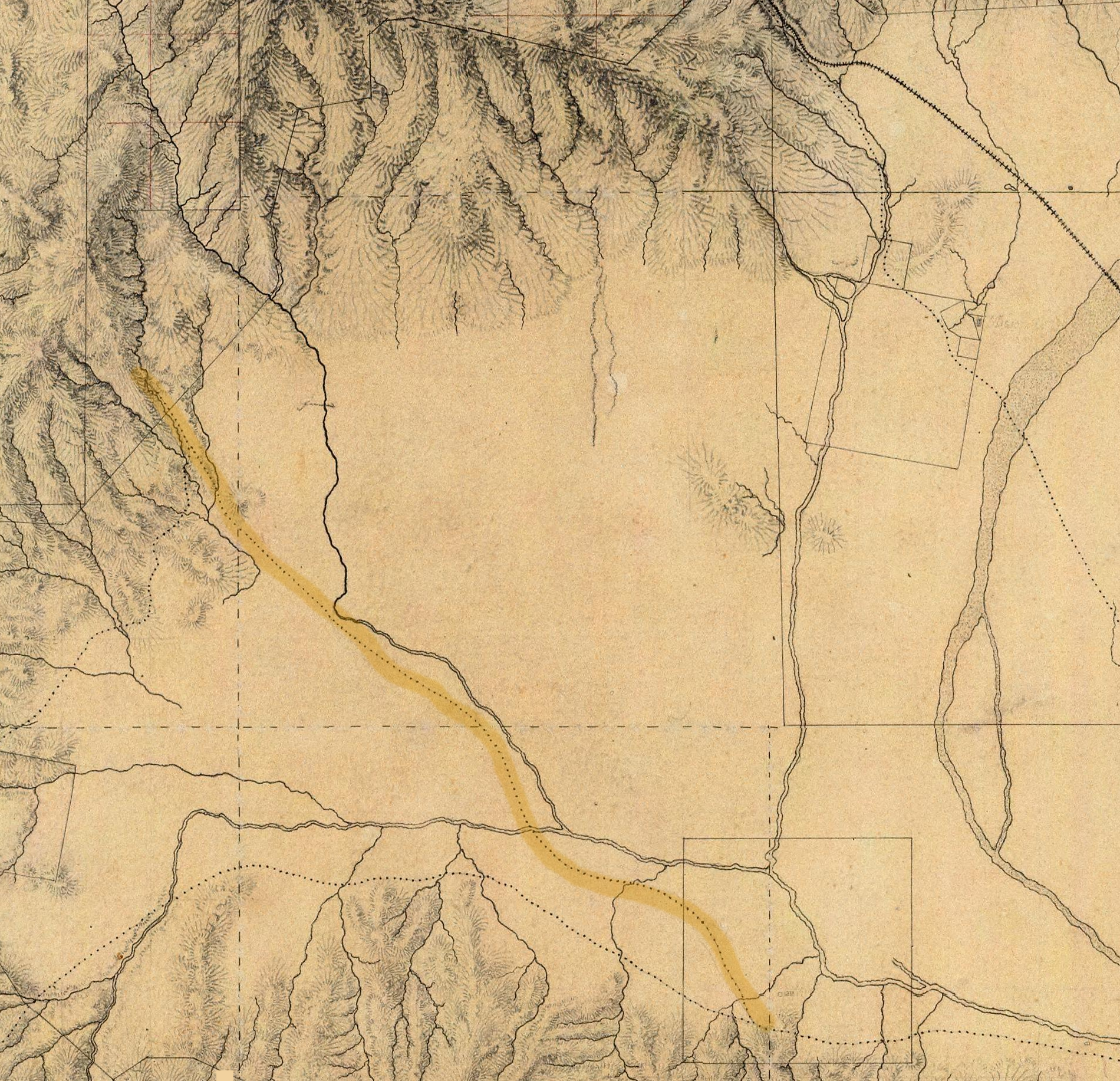
1880 manuscript map of the western San Fernando Valley, with the stage route from Rancho Los Encinos to Santa Susana Pass (upper left) highlighted.

The precipitous portion of the route on the San Fernando Valley side was called the Devil's Slide; horses were usually blindfolded and chains were used to augment brakes on the steep descent. Passengers debarked and walked.

The Santa Susana Pass stagecoach road continued in use as an alternative to the route along El Camino Viejo from 1861 to 1875, replacing the older road as the main route between Los Angeles and San Francisco. William E. Lovett acquired the mail contract in 1867 and carried mail and passengers via the Santa Susana Pass and between Los Angeles and San Diego. In 1876, the Southern Pacific Railroad opened a tunnel through the Newhall Pass, enabling rail connections from Los Angeles north to San Francisco, and rail travel soon replaced travel by stagecoach between Los Angeles and San Francisco. From this time the stagecoach traffic to Santa Barbara once again used the coast route, and the road through Santa Susana Pass was relegated to local traffic.

A new wagon route bypassing the deteriorating Devil's Slide was opened in 1895. Initially called El Camino Nuevo (the New Road), it was later named the Chatsworth Grade Road, which continued in use until the present Santa Susana Pass Road was built in 1917.

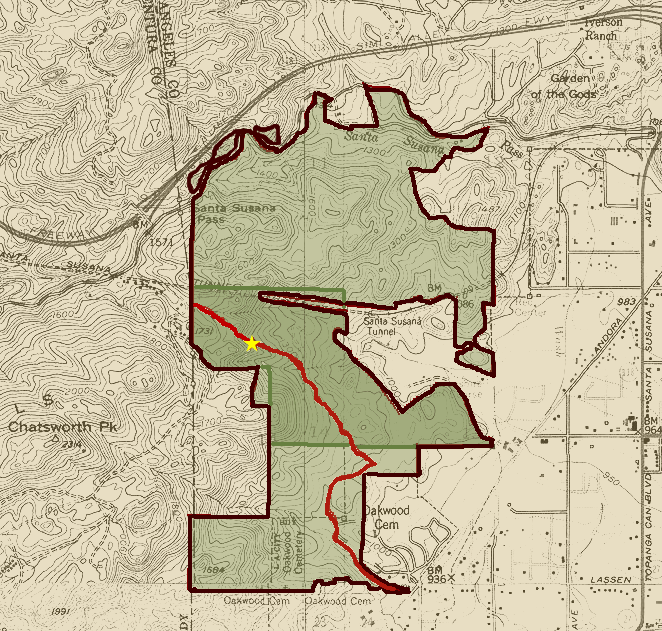
Map of the Stage Road NRHP property (shaded) within Santa Susana State Historic Park. The stage road is shown in red, and a star marks the location of the 1937 commemorative plaque at the base of the Devil's Slide.

Hikers in the Santa Susana Pass State Historic Park can still see the deep ruts made by the wagons on the 'Devil's Slide' section. A plaque was embedded into the sandstone rock by the Native Daughters of the Golden West in 1939, commemorating the Old Santa Susana Stage Road.

A branch of the Santa Susana Pass stagecoach road was designated as Los Angeles Historic-Cultural Monument #92, 'The Old Stagecoach Trail', by the City of Los Angeles on January 5, 1972. A 174-acre (0.70 km^{2}) parcel containing the stagecoach road was listed on the National Register of Historic Places in 1974. The stage route was also declared Ventura County Historical Landmark #104 on October 24, 1986.

== See also ==
- History of the San Fernando Valley to 1915
- Old Santa Susana Stage Road Historic-Cultural Monument
- Santa Susana Pass
- Santa Susana Pass State Historic Park
- Santa Susana Tunnel
- Spahn Movie Ranch
- Stagecoach Trail in northwest Illinois
