= List of productions using the Vasquez Rocks as a filming location =

The Vasquez Rocks, situated in the Sierra Pelona Mountains, in northern Los Angeles County, California, have been used as a setting for key scenes in many motion pictures, television shows, music videos, and video games. The following is a partial list of such multimedia in which the rock formations are included:

== Film ==
- Alpha Dog (2007)
- Amazon Women on the Moon (1987)
- Angry Video Game Nerd: The Movie (2014)
- Apache (1954)
- Army of Darkness (1992)
- Austin Powers: International Man of Mystery (1997)
- Bill & Ted's Bogus Journey (1991)
- Ben-Hur (2016)
- Blazing Saddles (1974)
- Borderlands (2024)
- Bubble Boy (2001)
- The Charge at Feather River (1953)
- Danger! Danger! (2021)
- Deathsport (1978)
- Delta Farce (2007)
- Dracula (1931)
- The Duel at Silver Creek (1952)
- Epoch (2000)
- The Flintstones (1994)
- For the Boys (1991)
- Forbidden World (1982)
- Free Enterprise (1998)
- Galaxy Quest (1999)
- Guns of El Chupacabra (1997)
- Hail, Caesar! (2016)
- Hearts of the West (1975)
- Hell Comes to Frogtown (1987)
- Holes (2003)
- In the Army Now (1994)
- Jay and Silent Bob Strike Back (2001)
- Jingle All the Way (1996)
- Joe Dirt (2001)
- John Carter (2012)
- Kill Your Darlings (2006)
- Last Assassins (1996)
- Little Miss Sunshine (2006)
- Nick Knight (1989)
- The Magnificent Seven Ride! (1972)
- Metalstorm: The Destruction of Jared-Syn (1983)
- Mighty Morphin Power Rangers: The Movie (1995)
- Missile to the Moon (1958)
- Mom and Dad Save the World (1992)
- The Muppet Movie (1979)
- My Stepmother Is an Alien (1988)
- Nickelodeon (1976)
- One Million B.C. (1940)
- Parasite (1982)
- Planet of Dinosaurs (1978)
- Planet of the Apes (2001)
- Playing God (1997)
- Princess of Mars (2009)
- The Rapture (1991)
- The Sea of Grass (1947)
- Secrets (1933)
- Short Circuit (1986)
- A Single Man (2009)
- Solar Crisis (1990)
- Son of the Border (1933)
- Space Raiders (1983)
- Star Trek (2009)
- Star Trek Into Darkness (2013)
- Star Trek IV: The Voyage Home (1986)
- The Ten Commandments (1956)
- Thief of Damascus (1952)
- A Thousand and One Nights (1945)
- To the Bone (2017)
- Very Bad Things (2006)
- Wavelength (1983)
- We're in the Legion Now! (1936)
- Werewolf of London (1935)
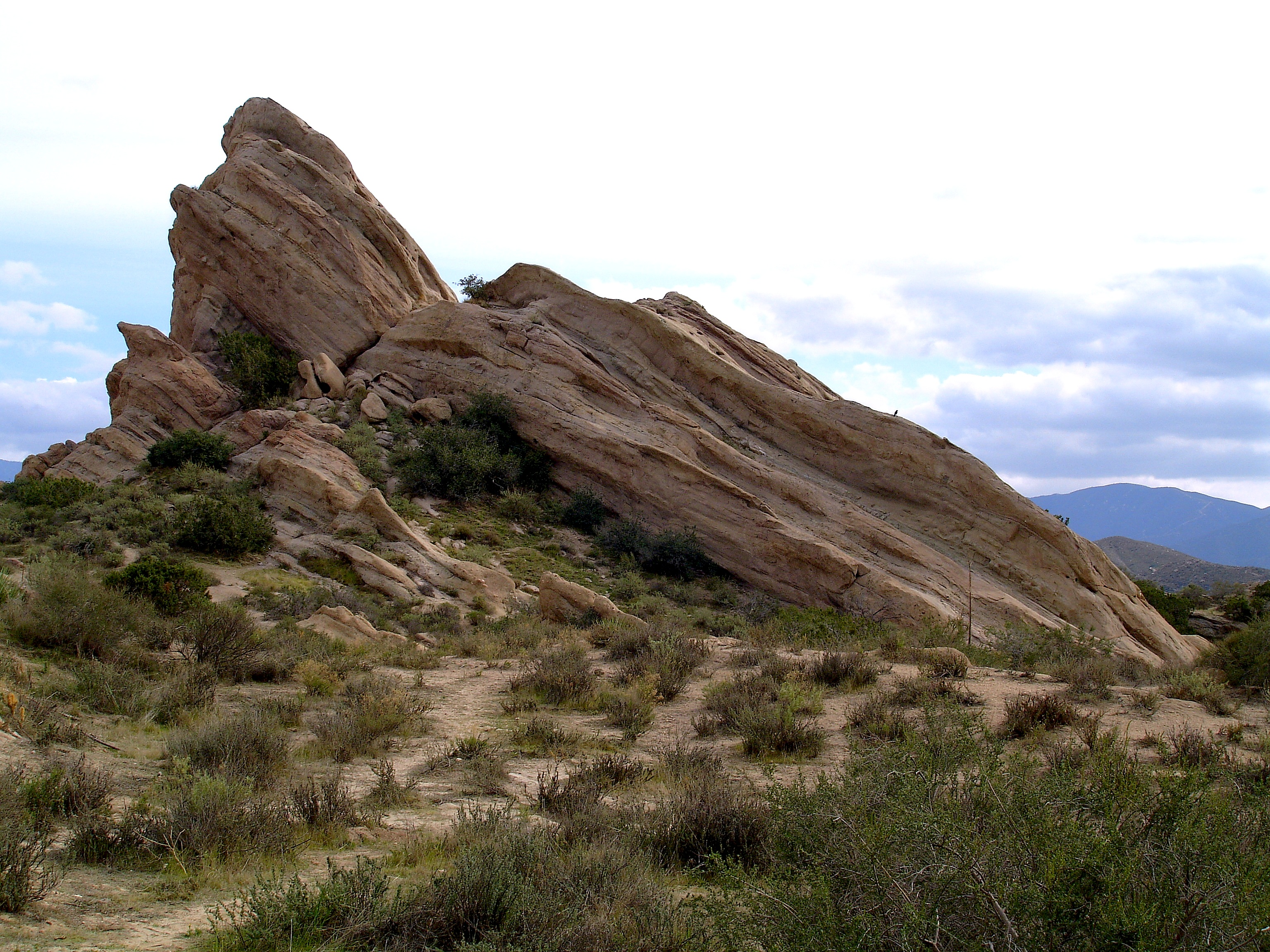
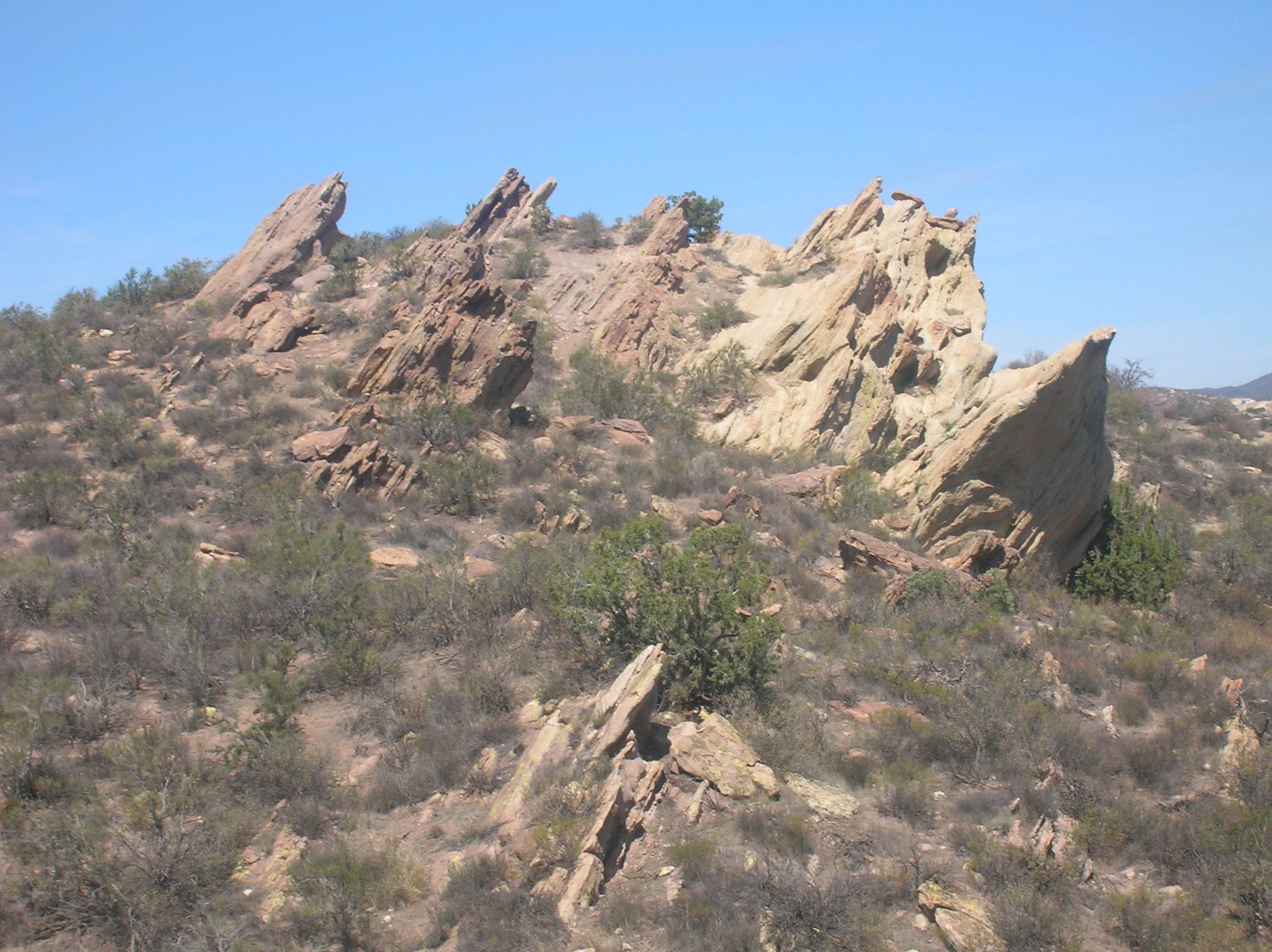
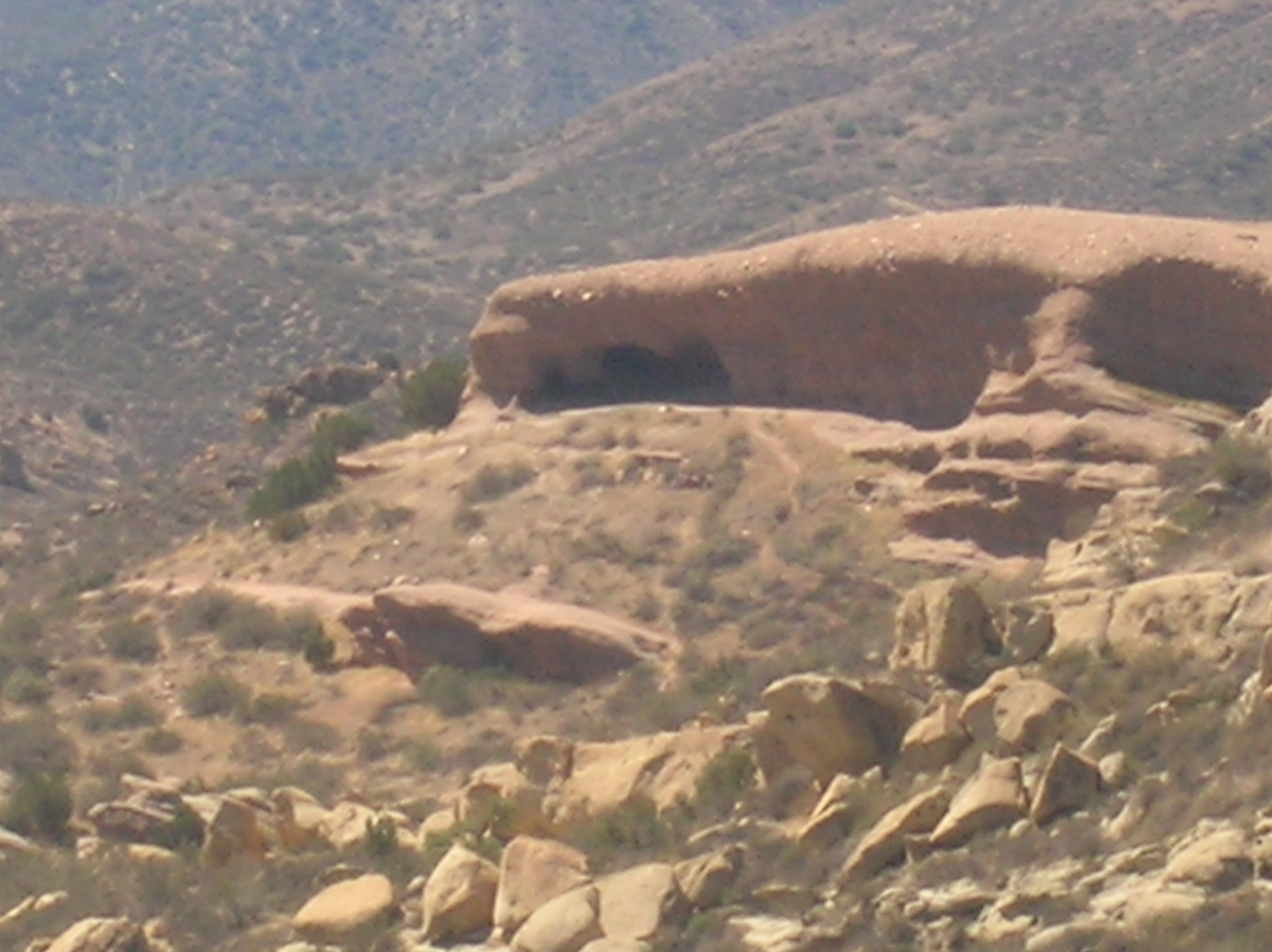
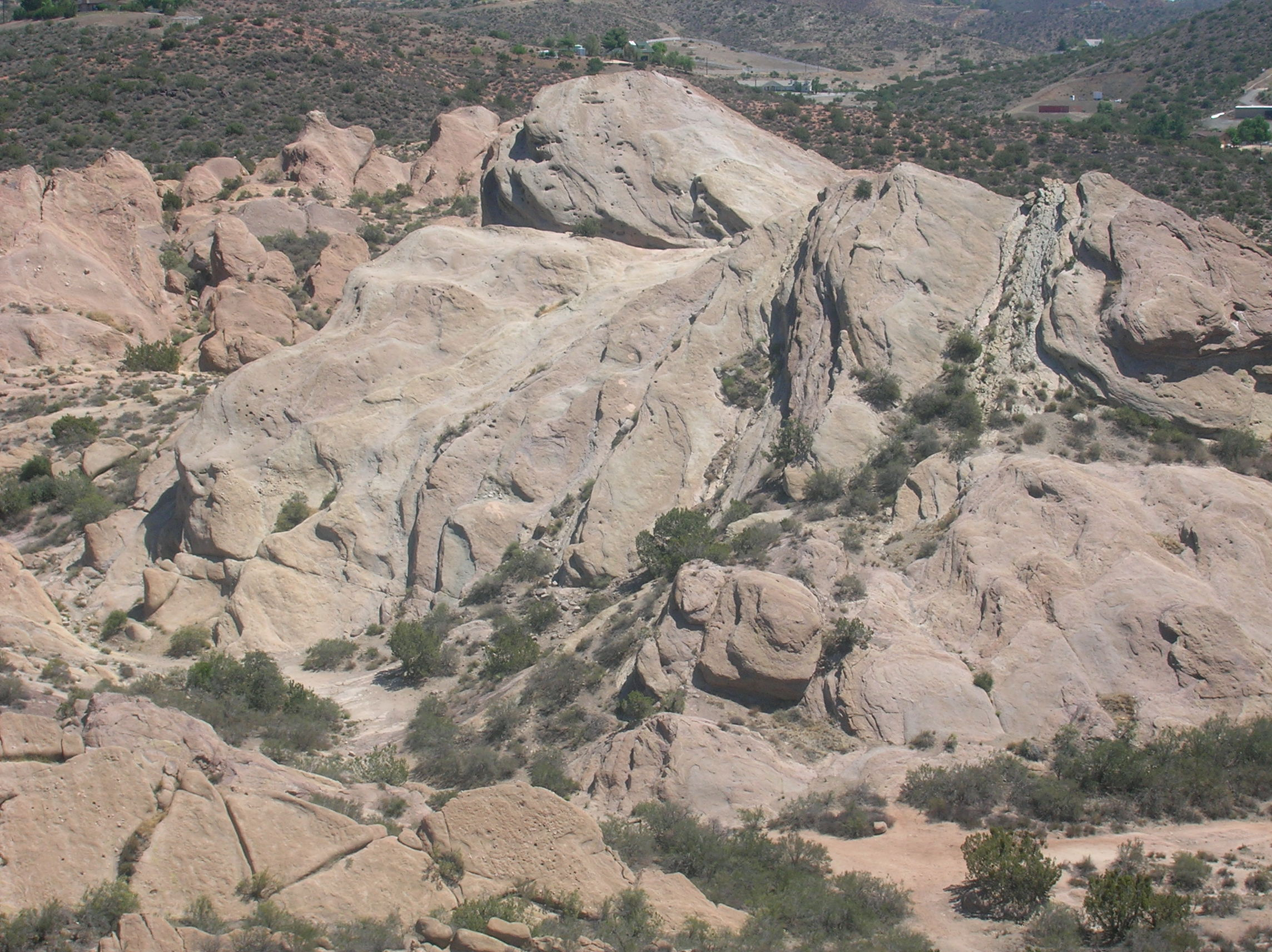
Vasquez Rocks

== Television ==
- 24
- The A-Team
- The Adventures of Champion
- The Adventures of Rin Tin Tin
- Airwolf
- Alias
- Alias Smith and Jones
- Alien Hunter
- Alien Nation
- Annie Oakley
- Bat Masterson
- Batman (TV series)
- Battlestar Galactica
- Benson
- Big Bad Beetleborgs
- The Big Bang Theory
- The Big Valley
- The Bionic Woman
- Bonanza
- Bones
- Branded
- Broken Arrow
- Buck Rogers in the 25th Century
- Buffalo Bill, Jr.
- Buffy the Vampire Slayer
- Charmed
- Cheyenne
- Cimarron Strip
- The Cisco Kid
- Cousin Skeeter
- Criminal Minds
- CSI: Crime Scene Investigation
- Daniel Boone
- Death Valley Days
- Dinosaurs
- Fantasy Island
- The Fall Guy
- Fallout
- Fastlane
- Fear Factor
- Firefly
- For All Mankind
- Friends
- The Fugitive
- The Gene Autry Show
- The Greatest American Hero
- Gunsmoke
- Have Gun – Will Travel
- Hell Town
- The High Chaparral
- Hondo
- Hunter
- The Incredible Hulk
- The Invaders
- JAG
- Johnny Ringo
- Korg: 70,000 B.C.
- Kung Fu
- Laramie
- Las Vegas
- Lassie
- Logan's Run
- The Lone Ranger
- MacGyver
- The Man from U.N.C.L.E.
- Masked Rider
- Maverick
- Medium
- The Middleman
- Mighty Morphin Alien Rangers
- Mighty Morphin Power Rangers
- Mission: Impossible
- Monk
- Mr. Show with Bob and David
- NCIS
- NCIS: Los Angeles
- New Girl
- New Monkees
- Numb3rs
- The Outer Limits (1963–65)
- Paradise
- Power Rangers In Space
- Power Rangers Lost Galaxy
- Power Rangers Turbo
- Power Rangers Wild Force
- Power Rangers Zeo
- The Pretender
- Prey
- Project U.F.O.
- The Range Rider
- The Rat Patrol
- The Rifleman
- The Rough Riders
- Roswell
- Room 104
- Saving Grace
- Shazam!
- Simon & Simon
- The Six Million Dollar Man
- Sliders
- Space: Above and Beyond
- Stage 7
- Star Trek
- Star Trek: Deep Space Nine
- Star Trek: Enterprise
- Star Trek: Picard
- Star Trek: Strange New Worlds
- Star Trek: The Next Generation
- Star Trek: Voyager
- Stories of the Century
- Street Hawk
- Tales from the Crypt
- Tales of the 77th Bengal Lancers
- Tales of Wells Fargo
- The Tall Man
- Teen Wolf
- The Texan
- Tombstone Territory
- Touch
- The Twilight Zone
- VR Troopers
- Voyagers!
- Wanted Dead or Alive
- The Westerner
- Westworld
- Wonder Man
- Wonder Woman
- The Wild Wild West
- Zane Grey Theatre
- Zorro

The rocks were drawn into the animated series Futurama and Star Trek: Lower Decks, depicting various alien landscapes as they did in other science fiction series. They were also animated in the film Shrek (2001). In the animated cartoon, "Phantom of the Horse Opera," featuring Woody Woodpecker, the rocks appeared in the background behind the 'Welcome to Spooksville' sign.

== Music videos ==
- "About a Girl" by Sugababes
- "Be with You" by Enrique Iglesias
- "Black or White" by Michael Jackson
- "Can't Believe a Single Word" by VHS OR BETA
- "Crawl Back In" by Dead By Sunrise
- "Drip Drop" by Lee Tae-min from "Press It"
- "Drummer Boy" by Debi Nova
- "Far Side of Crazy" by Wall Of Voodoo
- "The Future's So Bright, I Gotta Wear Shades" by Timbuk3
- "Heaven Is a Halfpipe" by OPM
- "Heavy Metal and Reflective" by Azealia Banks
- "High and Dry" (UK version) by Radiohead
- "I Know You" by Lil Skies & Yung Pinch
- "Like Flames" by Berlin
- "Love's Just a Feeling" by Lindsey Stirling featuring Rooty
- "Mind's Eye" by Wolfmother
- "Mobscene" by Marilyn Manson
- "On" by BTS from Map of the Soul: 7 (2020)
- "Rehab" by Rihanna (featuring Justin Timberlake)
- "Resta in ascolto" by Laura Pausini
- "S Club Party" by S Club 7 (also used for their 1999 TV special Back to the 50's)
- "Sanctuary" by Joji
- "Solitary Confinement" by Evidence (feat. Krondon) from The Layover EP DVD
- "Sora ni Kakeru Hashi (空にかける橋?)" by Masami Okui
- "Steal My Girl" by One Direction
- "This Darkened Heart" by All That Remains
- "This Ladder is Ours" by The Joy Formidable
- "Too Much to Think" by 311
- "Turnaround" by Stealin Horses
- "What Comes Around" by Ill Niño
- "When the Curtain Falls" by Greta Van Fleet
- "Work The Angles" by Dilated Peoples from The Platform
- "You Got Lucky" by Tom Petty and the Heartbreakers
- "Yuruginaimono Hitotsu" by B'z

The cover of Village People's album Cruisin' was shot at Vasquez Rocks.

== Video games ==
- Prey (2006), a video game by 3D Realms and Human Head Studios (Note: specifically the live action footage of the Super Trailer)

== See also ==
- Movie ranch
- Studio zone
- Category: Western (genre)
