= What Comes Around =

What Comes Around may refer to:

- What Comes Around (film), a 2022 American drama-thriller film
- "What Comes Around" (song), a 2002 song by Ill Niño
- "What Comes Around", a song by Beastie Boys from the album Paul's Boutique

== See also ==
- What Comes Around Goes Around (disambiguation)
