= Movie ranch =

Rural property used to produce motion pictures and television

A movie ranch is a ranch that is at least partially dedicated for use as a set in the creation and production of motion pictures and television shows. These were developed in the United States in southern California, because of the climate.

Movie ranches were developed in the 1920s for location shooting in Southern California to support the making of popular Western films. Finding it difficult to recreate the topography of the Old West on sound stages and studio backlots, the Hollywood studios went to the rustic valleys, canyons and foothills of Southern California for filming locations. Other large-scale productions, such as war films, also needed large, undeveloped settings for outdoor scenes, such as battles.

== History ==
To achieve greater scope, productions conducted location shooting in distant parts of California, Arizona, and Nevada. Initially production staff were required to cover their own travel expenses, resulting in disputes between workers and the studios. The studios agreed to pay union workers extra if they worked out of town.

To solve this problem, many movie studios purchased large tracts of undeveloped rural land, in many cases existing ranches, that were located closer to Hollywood. The ranches were often located just within the 30-mile (48 km) studio zone, specifically in the Simi Hills in the western San Fernando Valley, the Santa Monica Mountains, and the Santa Clarita area of the Greater Los Angeles Area. The natural California landscape proved to be suitable for western locations and other settings.

As a result of post-war (WWII) era suburban development, property values and taxes on land increased, even as fewer large parcels were available to the studios. Los Angeles development was widespread, resulting in urban sprawl. Most of the historic movie ranches have been sold and subdivided. A few have been preserved as open space in regional parks, and are sometimes still used for filming. To support continued use of the remaining ranches in its jurisdiction, the Santa Clarita Municipal Code was amended in 2011 to establish a "Movie Ranch Overlay Zone" which grants operating ranches added zoning benefits, such as helicopter landing permission and 24-hour indoor and outdoor filming where not adjacent to residences.

Below is a partial listing of some of the classic Southern California movie ranches from the first half of the 20th century, including some other and newer locations.

== Classic movie ranches ==
=== Apacheland Movie Ranch (Apacheland Studio) ===
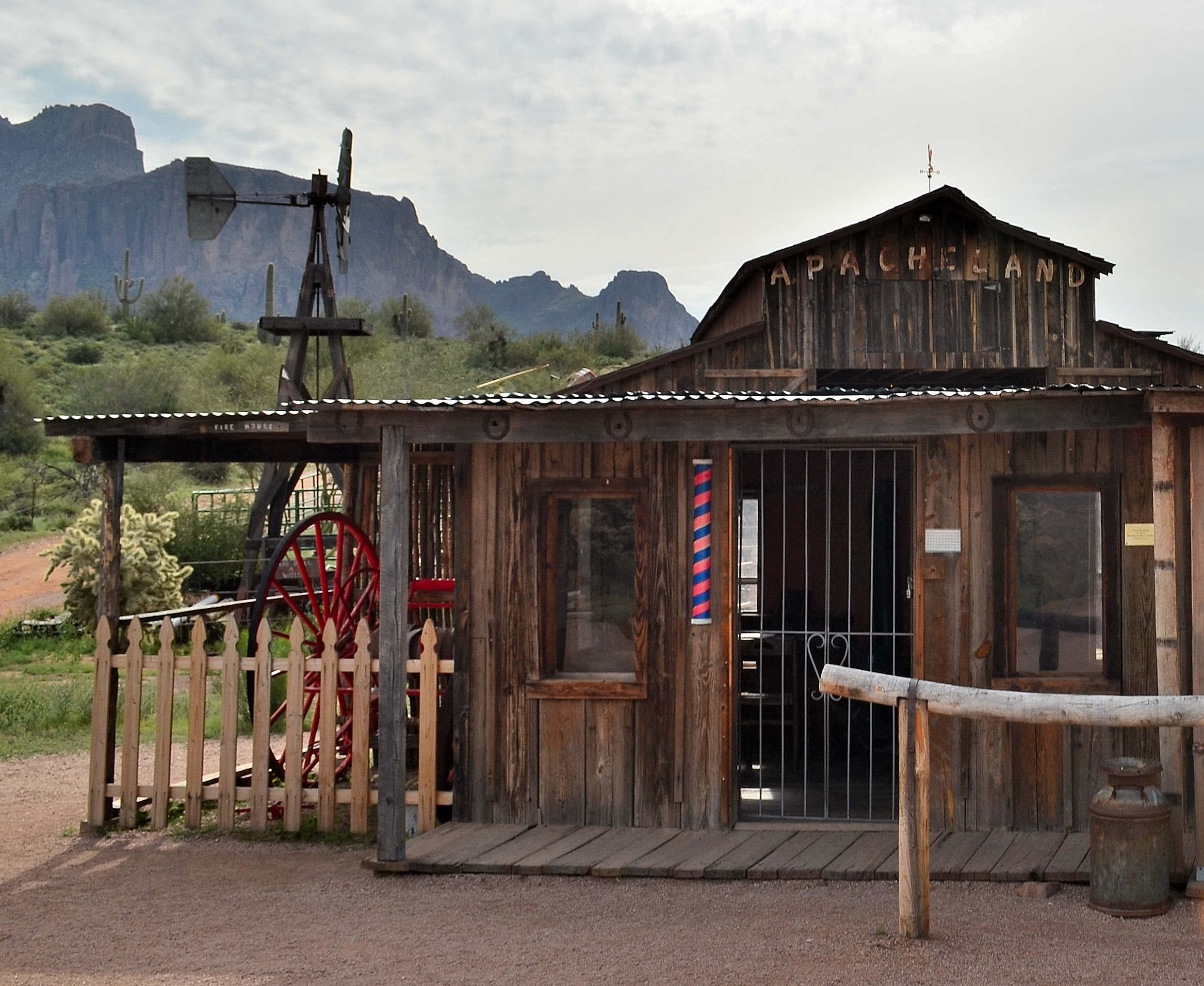
Apacheland building

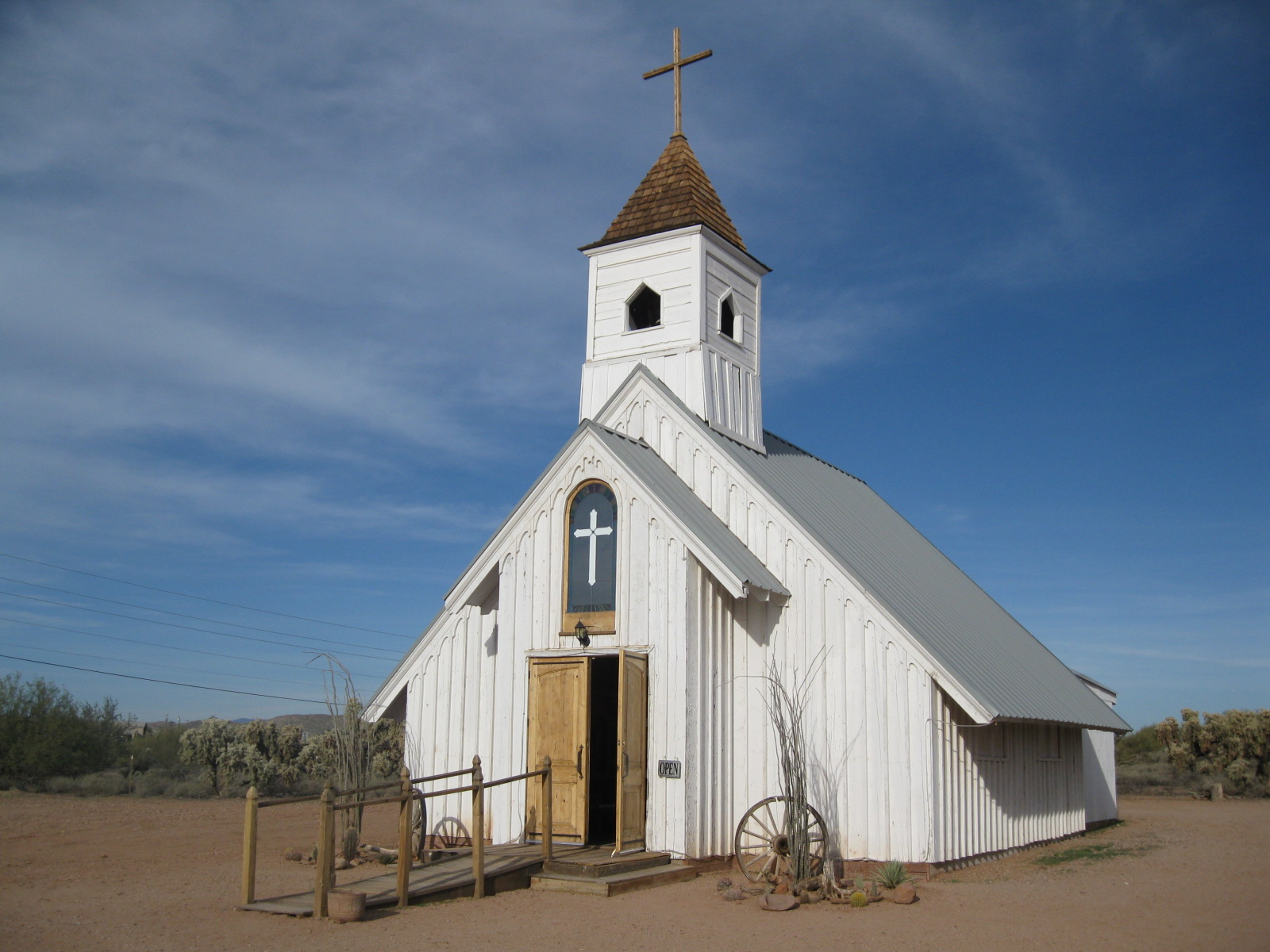
Building in the area of the ranch known as the Elvis Chapel, 2010

Located in the town of Apache Junction, Arizona, the Apacheland Movie Ranch and Apacheland Studio was developed from 1959 to 1960 and opened in 1960. Starting in late 1957, movie studios had been contacting Superstition Mountain-area ranchers, including the Quarter Circle U, the Quarter Circle W, and the Barkley Cattle Ranch, for options to use their properties as town sets. One notable production during this time was Gunfight at the O.K. Corral (1957) with Kirk Douglas and Burt Lancaster. Though historically inaccurate, it features the area known as Gold Canyon, with the Superstitions prominent behind the movie's representation of the Clanton ranch. During this time, Victor Panek contacted his neighbors in Apache Junction, Mr. and Mrs. J.K. Hutchens, to suggest the idea of building a dedicated studio in the Superstition area. Hutchens and Panek found a suitable site that was developed into Apacheland, intended to be the "Western Movie Capitol of the World".

Construction on the Apacheland Studio soundstage and adjacent "western town" set began on February 12, 1959, by Superstition Mountain Enterprises and associates. By June 1960, Apacheland was available for use by production companies and its first TV western Have Gun, Will Travel was filmed in November 1960, along with its first full-length movie The Purple Hills. Actors such as Elvis Presley, Jason Robards, Stella Stevens, Ronald Reagan, and Audie Murphy filmed many other western television shows and movies in Apacheland and the surrounding area, such as Gambler II, Death Valley Days, Charro!, and The Ballad of Cable Hogue. The last full-length movie to be filmed was the 1994 HBO movie Blind Justice with Armand Assante, Elisabeth Shue, and Jack Black.

On May 26, 1969, fire destroyed most of the ranch. Only a few buildings survived, but the sets were soon rebuilt to accommodate ongoing productions. A second fire destroyed most of Apacheland on February 14, 2004. The causes of both fires were never determined. On October 16, 2004, Apacheland was permanently closed. The Elvis Chapel and the Apacheland Barn, both of which survived the second fire, were donated to the Superstition Mountain Museum. Each structure was partially disassembled at the ranch, moved by truck, and reassembled on the museum grounds, where both stand today.

=== Columbia Ranch – Warner Bros. Ranch ===
Columbia Pictures, 411 North Hollywood Way, Burbank, CA, purchased the original 40-acre (16 ha) lot in 1934 as additional space to its Sunset Gower studio location, when Columbia was in need for more space and a true backlot/movie ranch. Through the years numerous themed sets were constructed across the movie ranch.

Formerly known as the Columbia Ranch and now the "Warner Brothers Ranch", this 32-acre (13 ha) movie ranch in Burbank, California, served as the filming location for both obscure and well-known television series, such as Father Knows Best, Hazel, The Flying Nun, Dennis the Menace, The Hathaways, The Iron Horse, I Dream of Jeannie (which also used the Father Knows Best house exterior), Bewitched, The Monkees, Apple's Way, and The Partridge Family (which also filmed on ranch sound stages).

A short list of the many classic feature films which filmed scenes on the movie ranch would include; Lost Horizon, Blondie, Melody in Spring, You Were Never Lovelier, Kansas City Confidential, High Noon, The Wild One, Autumn Leaves, 3:10 to Yuma, The Last Hurrah, Cat Ballou, and What's the Matter with Helen?.

It is commonly believed, though not the case, that Leave It to Beaver was filmed here, ('Beaver' actually filmed (first season) at CBS Studio Center – née Radford Studios and later at Universal Studios). The Waltons originally filmed on the Warner Bros. main lot where the recognizable house facade was located until it burned down in late 1991. A recreation of the Walton house was built on the Warner Bros. Ranch lot, utilizing the woodland mountain set originally utilized by Apple's Way, and later occasionally used by Fantasy Island TV shows. The facade remains and has been used in numerous productions such as NCIS, The Middle, and Pushing Daisies.

On April 15, 2019, it was announced that Warner Bros. will sell the property to Worthe Real Estate Group and Stockbridge Real Estate Fund as part of a larger real estate deal to be completed in 2023 which will see the studio get ownership of The Burbank Studios in time to mark its 100th anniversary. All historic sets and sound stages were demolished on October 26, 2023.

=== Corriganville Movie Ranch ===
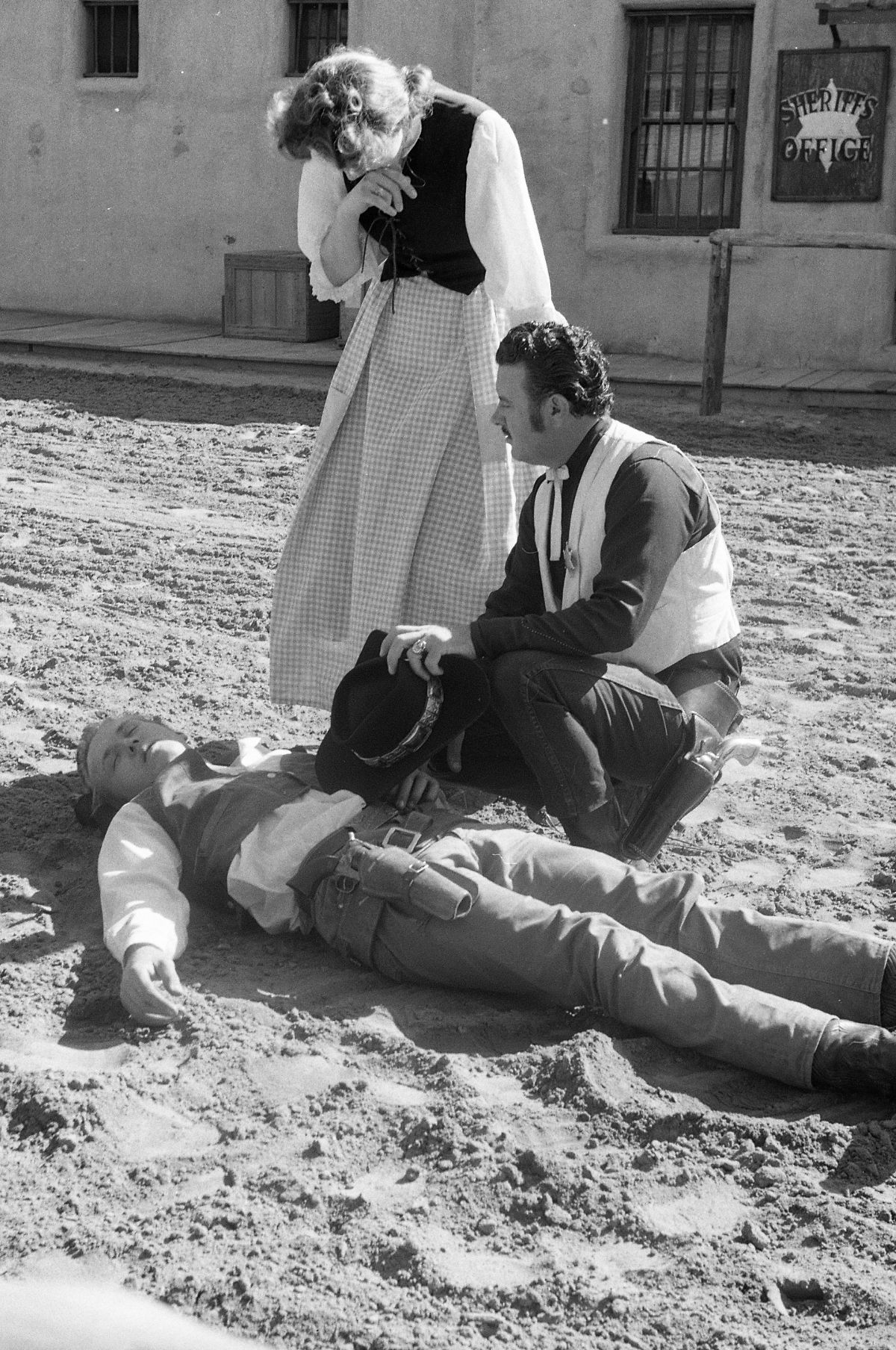
Actors in a death scene at Corriganville Movie Ranch, California, 1963

Circa 1937, Ray "Crash" Corrigan invested in property on the western Santa Susana Pass in California's Simi Valley and Santa Susana Mountains, developing his 'Ray Corrigan Ranch' into the 'Corriganville Movie Ranch.' Most of the Monogram Range Busters film series, which includes Saddle Mountain Roundup (1941) and Bullets and Saddles (1943), were shot here, as well as features such as Fort Apache (1948), The Inspector General (1949), Mysterious Island (1961), and hundreds more.

Corrigan opened portions of his vast movie ranch to the public in 1949 on weekends to explore such themed sets as a rustic western town, Mexican village, western ranch, outlaw hide-out shacks, cavalry fort, Corsican village, English hunting lodge, country schoolhouse, rodeo arena, mine-shaft, wooded lake, and interesting rock formations. This amusement park concept closed in 1966.

In spite of Corriganville's weekend tourist trade, production of films continued. The action TV series The Adventures of Rin Tin Tin used the Fort Apache set for many shots from 1954 to 1959. Roy Rogers, Lassie, and Emergency! production units also filmed scenes on the ranch. In 1966, Corriganville became 'Hopetown' when it was purchased by Bob Hope for real estate development. A wildfire destroyed the buildings in 1970.

About 200 acres (81 ha) of the original 2,000 acres (810 ha) is part of the Simi Valley Park system, open to the public as the Corriganville Regional Park. Though the original movie and TV sets are long gone, many of the building concrete foundations are still extant.

Parts of the movie Once Upon a Time in Hollywood (2019) were filmed at Corriganville Park, as a stand-in for the Spahn Movie Ranch.

=== Iverson Movie Ranch ===
In the 1880s, Karl and Augusta Iverson homesteaded a 160-acre (65 ha) family farm in the Simi Hills on Santa Susana Pass in what is now Chatsworth, eventually expanding their land holdings to about 500 acres (200 ha). of which approximately 320 acres (130 ha) made up the movie ranch. The Iversons reportedly allowed a movie to be filmed on the original 160-acre property as early as 1912, with the silent movies Man's Genesis (1912), My Official Wife (1914), and The Squaw Man (1914) being some of the productions often cited as among the earliest films shot on the site. Many of the earliest citations, though, have turned out to be incorrect. For example, The Squaw Man is now known to have filmed a scene elsewhere in Chatsworth, a short distance southwest of the Iverson property, but did not film on the Iverson Ranch.

By the late 1910s, an association developed between Hollywood and the Iverson Movie Ranch, which became a frequent outdoor location for Westerns in particular and also appeared in many adventures, war movies, comedies, science-fiction films, and other productions, standing in for Africa, the Middle East, the South Pacific, and other locations.

Buster Keaton's Three Ages (1923), Herman Brix's Hawk of the Wilderness (1938), Laurel and Hardy's The Flying Deuces (1939), and John Wayne's The Fighting Seabees (1944) are just a handful of the productions that were filmed on the ranch. The rocky terrain and narrow, winding roads frequently turned up in Republic serials of the 1940s and were prominently featured in chases and shootouts throughout the golden era of action B-Westerns in the 1930s and 1940s. For the 1945 Western comedy Along Came Jones, producer and star Gary Cooper had a Western town built at the ranch; this set was subsequently used in many other productions until the town was dismantled in 1957.

Hollywood's focus began to shift to the medium of television beginning in the late 1940s, and Iverson became a mainstay of countless early television series, including The Lone Ranger, The Roy Rogers Show, The Gene Autry Show, The Cisco Kid, Buffalo Bill, Jr., Zorro, and Tombstone Territory.

An estimated 3,500 or more productions, about evenly split between movies and television episodes, were filmed at the ranch during its peak years. The long-running TV Western The Virginian filmed on location at Iverson in the ranch's later period, as did Bonanza and Gunsmoke.

By the 1960s, the ownership of the ranch was split between two of Karl and Augusta's sons, with Joe Iverson, an African safari hunter married to Iva Iverson, owning the southern half of the ranch (the Lower Iverson) and Aaron Iverson, a farmer married to Bessie Iverson, owning the northern half (the Upper Iverson). In the mid-1960s the state of California began construction on the Simi Valley Freeway, which ran east and west, roughly following the dividing line between the Upper Iverson and Lower Iverson, cutting the movie ranch in half. That separated the ranch, and also produced noise, making the property less useful for moviemaking. The waning popularity of the Western genre and the decline of the B-movie coincided with the arrival of the freeway, which opened in 1967, and greater development pressure, signaling the end for Iverson as a successful movie ranch. The last few movies that filmed some scenes here included Support Your Local Sheriff (1968) and Roger Corman's Deathsport (1978).

In 1982, Joe Iverson sold what remained of the Lower Iverson to Robert G. Sherman, who almost immediately began subdividing the property. The former Lower Iverson now contains a mobile-home park, the nondenominational Church at Rocky Peak, and a large condominium development. The Upper Iverson is also no longer open to the public, as it is now a gated community consisting of high-end estates along with additional condominiums and an apartment building.

Part of the ranch has been preserved as parkland on both sides of Red Mesa Road, north of Santa Susana Pass Road in Chatsworth. This section includes the famous "Garden of the Gods" on the west side of Red Mesa, in which many rock formations seen in countless old movies and TV shows are accessible to the public. This includes the area on the east side of Red Mesa that includes the popular Lone Ranger Rock, which appeared beside a rearing Silver, the Lone Ranger's horse, in the opening to each episode of The Lone Ranger TV show. This area has been owned by the Santa Monica Mountains Conservancy since 1987.

The location of the ranch was in the northwest corner of Chatsworth, along the western side of Topanga Canyon Boulevard where it currently intersects with the Simi Valley Freeway.

=== Lasky Ranch – San Fernando Valley Providencia Ranch ===
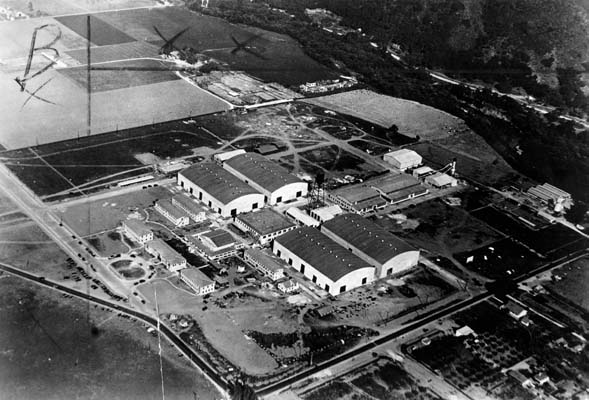
First National Studios with the Lasky Ranch in the distance.

The First Lasky Ranch in the San Fernando Valley was located on the Providencia Ranch. In 1912, Universal purchased the property and named Oak Crest Ranch. This old Universal ranch was built for the production of Universal 101Bison Brand Westerns.

In 1912, Universal; purchased and leased land here to create the first Universal City.

This Universal ranch was first used to film Universal Brand Bison films. In 1914, Universal City moved to its present location in the valley, The new Universal City was officially opened on March 15, 1915. The studio could be reached from Hollywood by using the Pacific Electric railway services, by rail to The Oak Crest Station and then Vehicle by way todays Barham Blvd. (Mammoth Film Plant : Van Nuys News and the Nuys Call, Nov. 29 1912)

On August 4, 1918, Jesse L. Lasky Feature Play Company began leasing the property. It consisted of 500 acres, with an additional 1,500 acres of adjoining government land which they were allowed to use. The ranch was also known as Providencia Flats and the Lasky Ranch. Around the same time that the lease was expiring, Paramount Famous Lasky purchased the Paramount Ranch location in the Agoura area, and moved all of the ranch sets to the new location. The lease then was turned back to the Hollingsworth interests. In 1929, Warner Bros. purchased a portion of the ranch from the W. I. Hollingsworth Realty Company. By 1950, Forest Lawn Cemetery owned the property. It was located across the Los Angeles River from the First National/Warner Bros. studios in the area which is now Forest Lawn Cemetery.

Hunkins Stables and Gopher Flats are close to Old Universal/Lasky Ranch in the San Fernando Valley.

=== Lasky Movie Ranch – Ahmanson 'Lasky Mesa' Ranch ===
This area is noted for a filming location history of many important movies, including, The Thundering Herd (Famous Players–Lasky Co. 1925), Gone with the Wind (Selznick 1939) and They Died with Their Boots On, "Santa Fe Trail" (Warner Bros. 1940), and many others.

From The Moving Picture World, October 10, 1914 (page 622 relates to the Lasky ranch and page 1078 to the new Lasky Ranch):

"The Lasky company has acquired a 4,000-acre ranch in the great San Fernando valley on which they have built a large two-story Spanish casa which is to be used in The Rose of the Ranch" which has just been started. The new ground is to be used for big scenes and where a large location is needed. A stock farm is to be maintained on the ranch. It is planned to use 500 people in the story. There will be 150 people transported through Southern California for the mission scenes. The studio will be used for the largest scene ever set up, the whole state and ground space being utilized."

In 1963, the Ahmanson family's Home Savings and Loan purchased the property and adjacent land. Home Savings and Loan was the parent company of Ahmanson Land Company, and so the ranch became known as the Ahmanson Ranch. Washington Mutual Bank (WAMU) took over ownership of Home Savings and proceeded with the development plans for the ranch.

The public advocacy for undeveloped open space pressure was very strong, and development was halted further by new groundwater tests showing migrating contamination of the aquifer with toxic substances from the adjacent Rocketdyne Santa Susana Field Laboratory (SSFL) experimental Nuclear Reactor and Rocket Engine Test Facility. The Santa Monica Mountains Conservancy and the State of California purchased the land for public regional park. The Lasky Movie Ranch is now part of the very large Upper Las Virgenes Canyon Open Space Preserve, with various trails to the Lasky Mesa locale.

The property was sold to a conservancy in 2003, but some filming was done there afterwards, including some scenes for the 2006 film Mission: Impossible III. More recently, it has been a hiking area.

=== Monogram Ranch/Melody Ranch ===
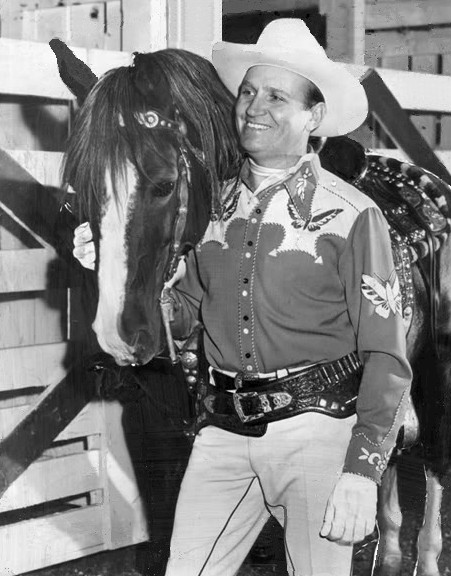
Gene Autry 1950

Originally known as 'Placeritos Ranch', the 110-acre (45 ha) ranch in lower Placerita Canyon was commonly referred to as the 'Monogram Ranch'. Russell Hickson owned the property from 1936 until his death in 1952, and built-reconstructed all original sets on the ranch. A year later in 1937, Monogram Pictures signed a long-term lease with Hickson for 'Placeritos Ranch', with terms that the ranch be renamed 'Monogram Ranch.'

After Gene Autry purchased the property in 1953, he renamed it as 'Melody Ranch.' It is located near Santa Clarita, California, just north of Newhall Pass. In 1962 a brush fire destroyed most of the western town sets on the ranch, and Autry sold 98-acre (40 ha), most of Melody Ranch.

The remaining 22-acre (8.9 ha) property was purchased by the Veluzats in 1990 for the new Melody Ranch Studios movie ranch.

From 1926, early silent films were often shot in Placerita Canyon, including silent film westerns featuring Tom Mix. In 1931, Monogram Pictures took out a five-year lease on a parcel of land in central Placerita Canyon. The western town constructed there was located just east of what is now the junction of the Route 14 Antelope Valley Freeway and Placerita Canyon Road. Today, this is part of Disney's Golden Oak Ranch (see below) near Placerita Canyon State Park.

In 1935, as a result of a Monogram-Republic studio merger, the 'Placerita Canyon Ranch' became owned by the newly formed Republic Pictures. In 1936, when the lease expired, the entire western town was relocated a few miles to the north at Russell Hickson's 'Placeritos Ranch' in lower Placerita Canyon, near the junction of Oak Creek Road and Placerita Canyon Road. The property was leased by the newly independent Monogram Pictures, and renamed as 'Monogram Ranch' in 1937.

Gene Autry, actor, western singer, and producer, purchased the 110-acre (45 ha) 'Monogram Ranch' property from the Hickson heirs in 1953. He renamed the property 'Melody Ranch' after his 1940 film of the same name, and his following Sunday afternoon CBS radio show (1940–1956). A brushfire swept through 'Monogram Ranch' in August 1962, destroying most of the original standing western sets. The devastated landscape was useful for productions such as Combat!. A large Spanish hacienda, and a complete adobe village survived on the northeast section of the ranch.

In 1990, after the death of his horse 'Champion,' which Autry had kept in retirement there, the actor put the remaining 12-acre (4.9 ha) ranch up for sale. It was purchased by Renaud and Andre Veluzat to be developed as an active movie ranch for location shooting. The Veluzats have a 22-acre (8.9 ha) complex of sound stages, western sets, prop shop, and the backlots. They call it the 'Melody Ranch Motion Picture Studio' and 'Melody Ranch Studios.'

The ranch has a museum open year-round. One weekend a year the entire ranch is open to the public during the Cowboy Poetry & Music Festival, held at the end of April.

The 22-acre (8.9 ha) Melody Ranch Studio was used in 2012 for filming some scenes for Quentin Tarantino's Django Unchained. The owners in 2019 were Renaud and Andre Veluzat.

=== Paramount Movie Ranch ===
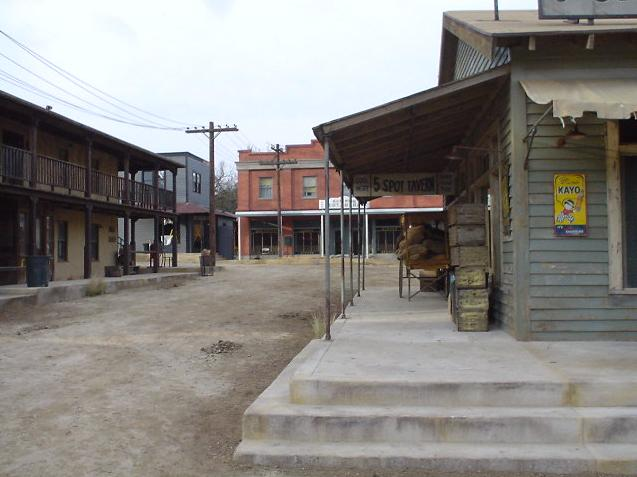
Sets at Paramount Movie Ranch, February 2003

In 1927, Paramount Studios purchased a 2,700-acre (11 km^{2}) ranch on Medea Creek in the Santa Monica Mountains near Agoura Hills, between Malibu and the Conejo Valley. The studio built numerous large-scale sets on the ranch, including a huge replica of early San Francisco, an Old West town, and a Welsh mining village (built by 20th Century Fox for How Green Was My Valley (1941), and later redressed (with coal mine tipple removed) as a French village for use in The Song of Bernadette (1943), and again used for The Inspector General (1949)). Western town sets posed as Tombstone, Arizona, and Dodge City, Kansas, as well as Tom Sawyer's Missouri, 13th-century China, and many other locales and eras around the world.

It is now Paramount Ranch Park in the Santa Monica Mountains National Recreation Area. The National Park Service took over a section of the lot in 1980 and restored the sets, working from old black and white photographs. The NPS website lists movie and TV productions filmed there.

The Western Town was constructed during 1954 when Paramount purchased (Academy Award-winning) sets previously used at RKO Pictures Encino Movie Ranch, and was a location for some of the era's popular TV Westerns, including The Cisco Kid and Gunsmoke. This remaining set of buildings continued to be used in filming, notably for the Dr. Quinn, Medicine Woman television series and the HBO series Carnivàle, and more recently Westworld.

Paramount Ranch was most recently used as a filming location for The Mentalist, Weeds, The X-Files, Hulu's Quickdraw and season 3 of Escape the Night, a YouTube Premium show by Joey Graceffa.

The Paramount Ranch was also the home of the original Renaissance Pleasure Faire of Southern California from 1966 to 1989, the home of the Topanga Banjo•Fiddle Contest, held each May, and the eponymously titled Paramount Ranch, an alternative art fair founded from 2014 to 2016.

The Paramount Ranch structures suffered near-total destruction during the November 2018 Woolsey Fire. By that time, it was managed by the National Park Service, but some filming had been done here for Westworld Seasons 1 and 2. Parts of the 2015 movie Bone Tomahawk were filmed here. A campaign called The Paramount Project was launched as of November 16 to aid in the reconstruction efforts to rebuild Paramount Ranch.

=== RKO Encino Ranch ===
The RKO "Encino Ranch" was an 89-acre (360,000 m^{2}) movie ranch located on the outskirts of the city of Encino, California, in the San Fernando Valley, near the Los Angeles River and west of today's Sepulveda Basin Recreation Area on Burbank Boulevard. RKO Radio Pictures purchased the property, then still a ranch bordered by similarly undeveloped land, as a location to film their epic motion picture Cimarron (1931). The picture was a critical success, going on to win Academy Awards for Best Picture, Best Writing, Best Art Direction, and Best Make-Up. Art Director Max Ree won the art direction award for creative design of the theme sets constructed on the former Jasmine Quinn Ranch, which consisted of both a complete western town and a three block modern main street built to represent the fictional Oklahoma town of Osage.

In addition to Cimarron scenery, RKO continued to create diverse sets for their expanding movie ranch, including a New York City avenue, brownstone street, English row houses, slum district, small town square, residential neighborhood, three working train depots, mansion estate, New England farm, western ranch, a mammoth medieval City of Paris, European marketplace, Russian village, Yukon mining camp, ocean tank with sky backdrop, Moorish casbah, Mexican outpost, Sahara Desert fort, plaster mountain range diorama, and a football field sized United States map which Fred Astaire and Ginger Rogers danced across in The Story of Vernon and Irene Castle (1939). Also constructed were scenery docks, carpentry shop, prop storage, greenhouse, and three fully equipped soundstages averaging 11,000 sq ft (1,000 m^{2}) each.

Selected movies that contain scenes shot on the Encino Ranch include: What Price Hollywood? (1932), King Kong (1933), Of Human Bondage (1934), Becky Sharp (1935), Walking on Air (1936), Stage Door (1937), The Hunchback of Notre Dame (1939), Kitty Foyle (1940), Citizen Kane (1941), Cat People (1942), Murder, My Sweet (1944), Dick Tracy film noir series (1945–1947), It's a Wonderful Life (1946) (Bedford Falls),They Live by Night (1948), and many more.

A Dragnet episode, shot in 1953 for an NBC 1954 broadcast, was the last project to film on the ranch. Entitled "The Big Producer", it featured the then crumbling lot as the fictitious "Westside Studio".

The ranch property was sold in 1954 to developers to put up the Encino Park housing tract, which featured modern home designs by architect Martin Stern, Jr.

=== Walt Disney's Golden Oak Ranch ===
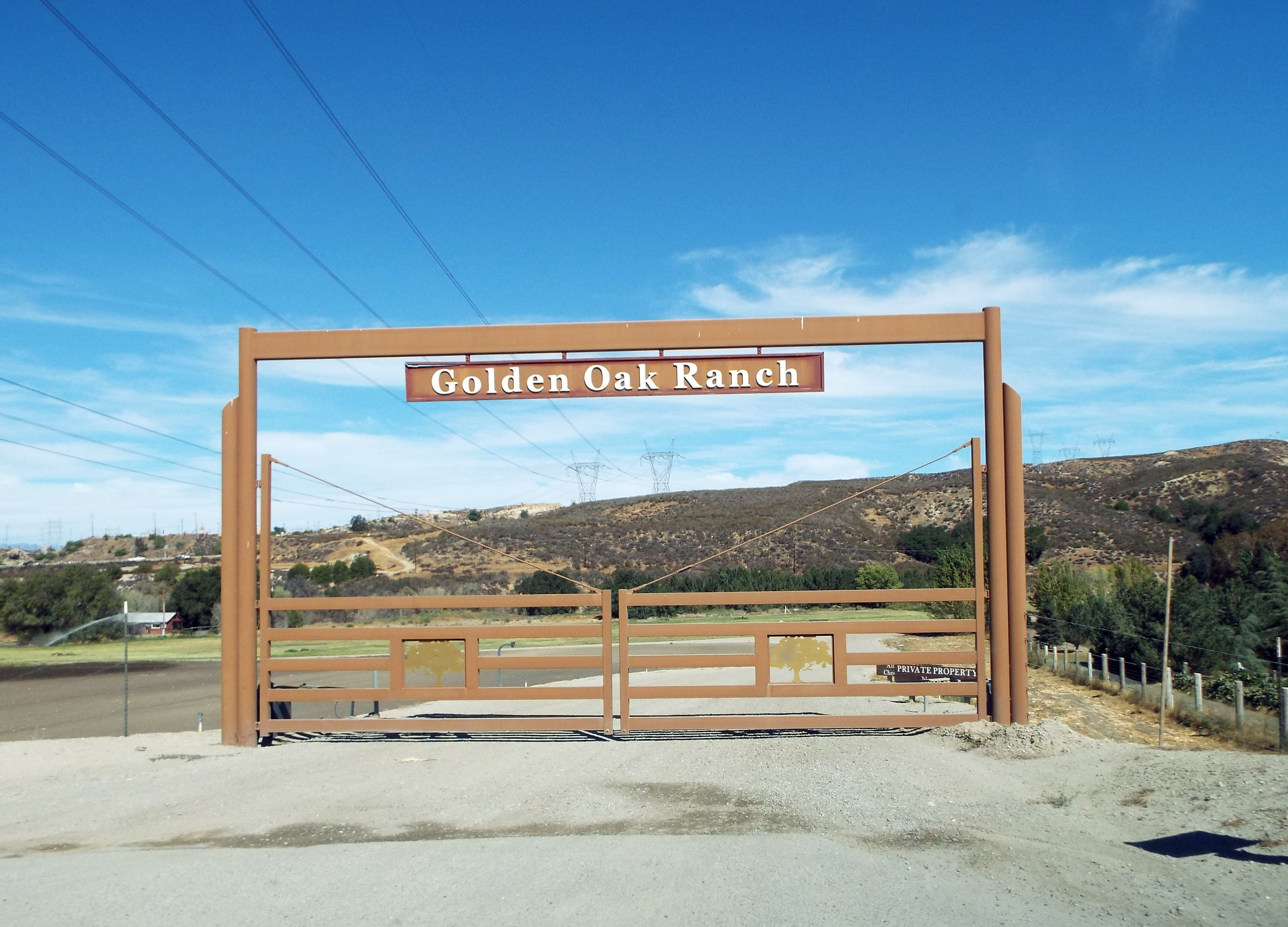
Golden Oak Ranch entrance gate

A strip of farmland that once was home to early filming locations including the Fat Jones Ranch, the Andy Jauregui Ranch and the Trem Carr Ranch became the Walt Disney Company's Golden Oak Ranch starting in 1959. The ranch is located in central Placerita Canyon near Santa Clarita, California in the northern San Gabriel Mountains foothills. It was named for the Gold discovery by Francisco Lopez in the wild onion roots under the "Oak of the Golden Dream", in present-day Placerita Canyon State Park. The Ranch was still being used for occasional filming when Walt Disney took an interest in the property. In 1959, driven by concern that the ranches of other movie studios were gradually being subdivided, Disney purchased the 315-acre (1.27 km^{2}) ranch. During the next five years, the Walt Disney Studios also bought additional land which increased the size of the property to 691 acres (2.80 km^{2}).

The Walt Disney Company worked closely with the State of California when a portion of the western border of the ranch was purchased for the Antelope Valley Freeway. This construction was carefully planned so that it didn't intrude into the film settings. In 2009, Disney announced the expansion of the studio complex, with master planning and environmental impact studies commencing. The expanded site would be called Disney | ABC Studios at The Ranch.

Disney productions that have done filming at Golden Oak Ranch over the past decades include Old Yeller, Toby Tyler, The Parent Trap, The Shaggy Dog, Follow Me Boys and, more recently, The Santa Clause, Pearl Harbor, Princess Diaries II and Pirates of the Caribbean II & III.

=== Spahn Movie Ranch ===
The Spahn Movie Ranch is a 55-acre (22 ha) property located on Santa Susana Pass in the Simi Hills above Chatsworth, California. The Spahn Movie Ranch, once owned by silent film actor William S. Hart, was used to film many westerns, particularly from the 1940s to the 1960s, including Duel in the Sun, and episodes of television's Bonanza and The Lone Ranger. A western town set was located at the ranch.

Dairy farmer George Spahn purchased the 55 acres (22 ha) in 1953, from former owners Lee and Ruth McReynolds. Spahn added more sets and rental horses, making it a popular location for horseback riding among locals. This continued to be the location for various B movie and TV series film until the late 1960s. As the western genre became less popular, however, the ranch became almost deserted. The Spahn Ranch was the primary headquarters of the infamous Manson Family by 1968.

Spahn allowed the Manson group to live there rent-free in exchange for housework and sexual favors from the group's women, according to TIME. The ranch was the base for the group's murder of Sharon Tate and six others over a two-day period in August 1969.

The ranch and some residents are depicted in the Quentin Tarantino film Once Upon a Time in Hollywood (2019). The scenes for the movie were actually filmed at Corriganville Park in Simi Valley.

A 1970 mountain wildfire destroyed the film set and the residential structures. The site that was the Spahn Movie Ranch is now part of the Santa Susana Pass State Historic Park. Spahn died in 1974.

=== 20th Century Fox Movie Ranch ===
Located in the Santa Monica Mountains, the 20th Century Fox Movie Ranch (aka: Century Movie Ranch & Fox Movie Ranch) was first purchased in 1946 by 20th Century Fox. One of the first sets was a working New England farmhouse built for Mr. Blandings Builds His Dream House (1948). From 1956 to 1957, 20th Century Fox productions filmed their first television series there: My Friend Flicka for CBS television.

The Fox Ranch was used for most exteriors of the CBS-TV series Perry Mason (1957–66).

The Century Movie Ranch was the main filming location with outdoor sets for the original 1970 MASH film and subsequent M*A*S*H (TV series). It was used as a location in dozens of films, including a number of the Tarzan movies, Robin Hood: Men in Tights, the original Planet of the Apes film and subsequent television series.

The Fox Movie Ranch property was purchased and preserved in the new state park, Malibu Creek State Park, opened to the public in 1976. A few productions continued to be filmed there.

== Other original locations ==
=== Bell Moving Picture Ranch ===
The Bell Moving Picture Ranch, later renamed the Bell Location Ranch, is off the Santa Susana Pass in the Simi Hills above the Spahn Movie Ranch site and Santa Susana Pass State Historic Park.

Among the many movies to film at Bell Ranch were Gunsight Ridge (1957), starring Joel McCrea; Escort West (1959), starring Victor Mature; Hombre (1967), starring Paul Newman; Gun Fever (1958), starring Mark Stevens; and Love Me Tender (1956), the first movie of Elvis Presley.

The climactic sequence in the Elvis movie Love Me Tender, a Western that also starred Richard Egan and Debra Paget, was filmed on a rugged slope at Bell Ranch known as the "Rocky Hill," with its exact location remaining a mystery for almost 60 years until it was discovered on an expedition by film historians in early 2015. The Victor Mature movie Escort West (1959) filmed at the same location, and shots from the two movies were combined to help find the site.

Many of the television Westerns used the ranch, including Bonanza, Gunsmoke, Zorro, The Monroes, How the West Was Won, Dundee and the Culhane, The Big Valley and Have Gun – Will Travel. Even McCloud used the Western street and surrounding area for an episode with Dennis Weaver. An episode of the original Star Trek series, "A Private Little War" (1968), was partly shot at Bell Ranch's Box Canyon using it to stand in for an alien world.

In 1990, all of the sets were removed but some filming continued.

=== Big Sky Ranch ===
Big Sky Ranch is a cattle ranch located in Simi Valley, California. It has been used for the filming of Western television shows and film productions. Some of the past television episodes and productions filmed there include: Rawhide, Gunsmoke, Bonanza, Little House on the Prairie, Highway to Heaven, Father Murphy, The Thorn Birds, Jericho and Carnivàle.

A fire in 2003 destroyed most of the standing sets, including a replica of the farm house from Little House on the Prairie and sets used in the TV series Gunsmoke and many movies.

As of 2011, the ranch's web site indicated that it was still available as a filming location, "with rolling hills and great vistas and .. with secluded canyons, undulating valleys and a grand mesa. Credits in the past few years include "The Office", "Saving Mr. Banks", "Captain America", "Django Unchained", "Agents of SHIELD", "Hail Caesar", and "The Revenant".

=== Jack Ingram Movie Ranch ===
Formerly the estate of Charles Chaplin, the 160-acre (65 ha) ranch, located in Calabasas, was purchased by Jack Ingram in 1944 from James Newill and Dave O'Brien, who had purchased the goat ranch in order to avoid the draft during World War II. When they were declared 4F unfit for military service, they sold the ranch to Ingram. Ingram purchased a bulldozer, and with the help of his friends including actors Pierce Lyden and Kenne Duncan built a western town of two streets on the site. The ranch included a house that Ingram lived in that could occasionally be seen in the background of some scenes shot at the ranch. In 1947, the Ingram ranch became the first movie ranch open to the public.

In 1956, he sold the ranch to Four Star Television Productions. As of 1994, the ranch land had been completely re-developed with suburban-style housing.

=== Pioneertown ===
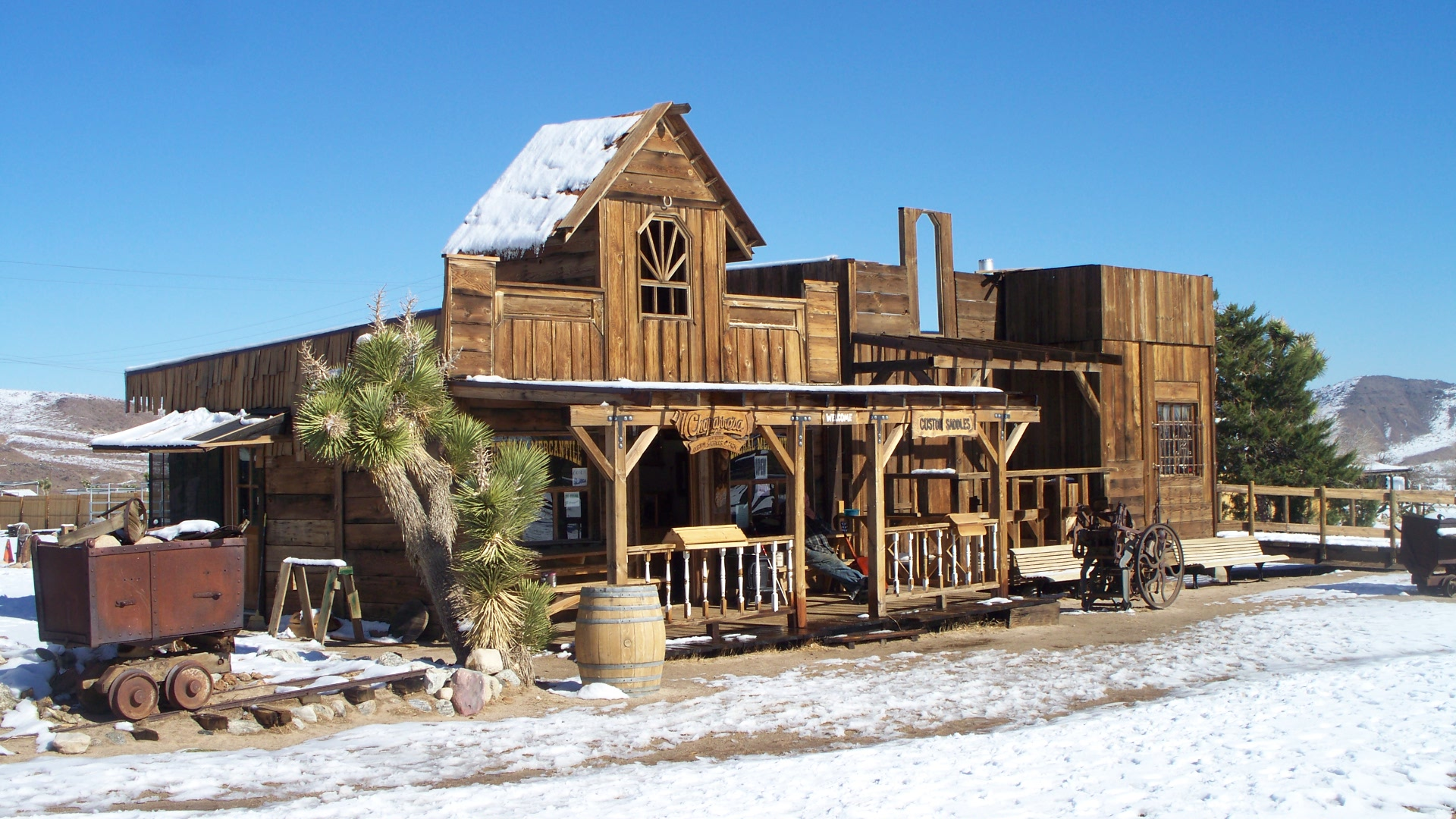
Pioneertown saddlery, 2009

Pioneertown, California is located in the Morongo Basin region of Southern California's Mojave Desert in San Bernardino County, California. The town started as a live-in Old West motion picture set on a movie ranch, built in the 1940s. The movie set was designed to also provide a place for the actors to live, while having their homes used as part of the movie set. A number of Westerns and early television shows were filmed in Pioneertown, including The Cisco Kid and Edgar Buchanan's Judge Roy Bean. Roy Rogers, Dick Curtis, and Russell Hayden were among the original developers and investors, and Gene Autry frequently filmed his show at the six-lane Pioneer Bowl bowling alley.

The sets have been retained as a tourist attraction which remained open as of April 2019.

=== Red Hills Ranch ===
Red Hills Ranch is a movie ranch in Sonora, California, which served as a location for Bonanza, The Adventures of Brisco County, Jr., Little House on the Prairie and other productions. The outdoor sets built for Back to the Future Part III (1990) and used in Bad Girls (1994) were destroyed by a lightning strike wildfire in 1996. It is no longer an area for filming.

=== Will Rogers State Historic Park ===
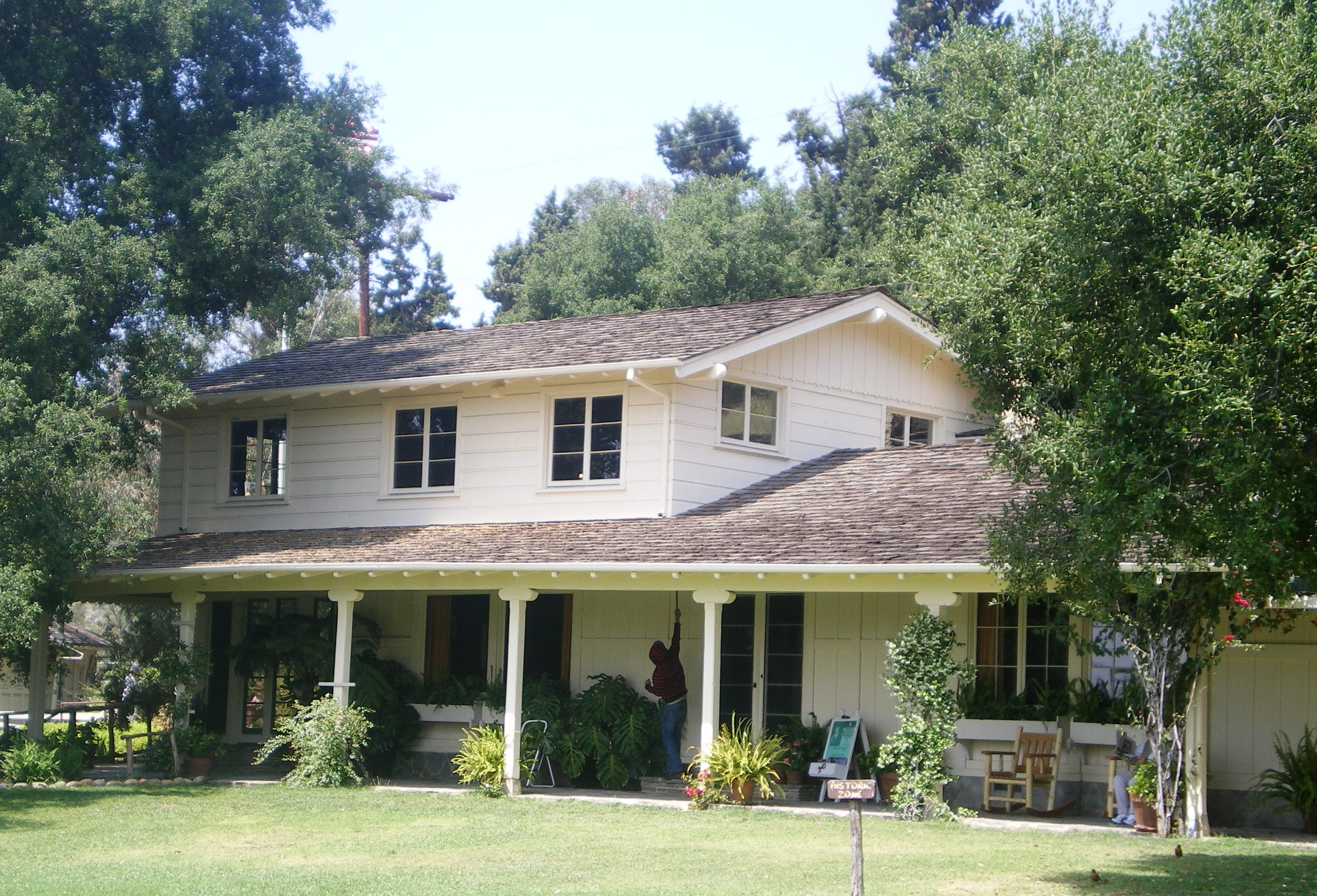
Will Rogers House, Pacific Palisades

Will Rogers State Historic Park includes the former Pacific Palisades estate of American humorist Will Rogers, complete with his historic residence, equestrian ranch, and regulation polo field. Stradling Rustic Canyon, the scenic property was a popular location for film shoots.

Situated in the Santa Monica Mountains in western Los Angeles, the property was given to the state in 1944, and is open to the public. Extensive restoration was undertaken in 2010.

The property was closed indefinitely to filming because of fires in the area in November 2018.

== Newer movie ranches ==
=== Mortenson's Eaves Movie Ranch ===
Located in Santa Fe, New Mexico, the Mortenson's Eaves Movie Ranch, formally known as J.W Eaves Ranch was opened in the early 1960s with their first production being the CBS television series Empire in 1962. Clint Mortenson acquired the ranch in 2024. Over 250 other productions have filmed here over the years including The Cheyenne Social Club, Chisum, Easy Rider and Young Guns II. In 1998, a tornado touched down one mile from the film crew of Wishbone's Dog Days of the West as they were shooting the western scenes. It dissipated as it headed toward the set.

The Eaves Ranch is open to the public and has been home to the Thirsty Ear roots music festival. Other festivals have also been held here, but some movie-making continues. For example, some scenes for the 2018 Cohen Brothers anthology film, The Ballad of Buster Scruggs, were filmed here.

=== Skywalker Ranch ===
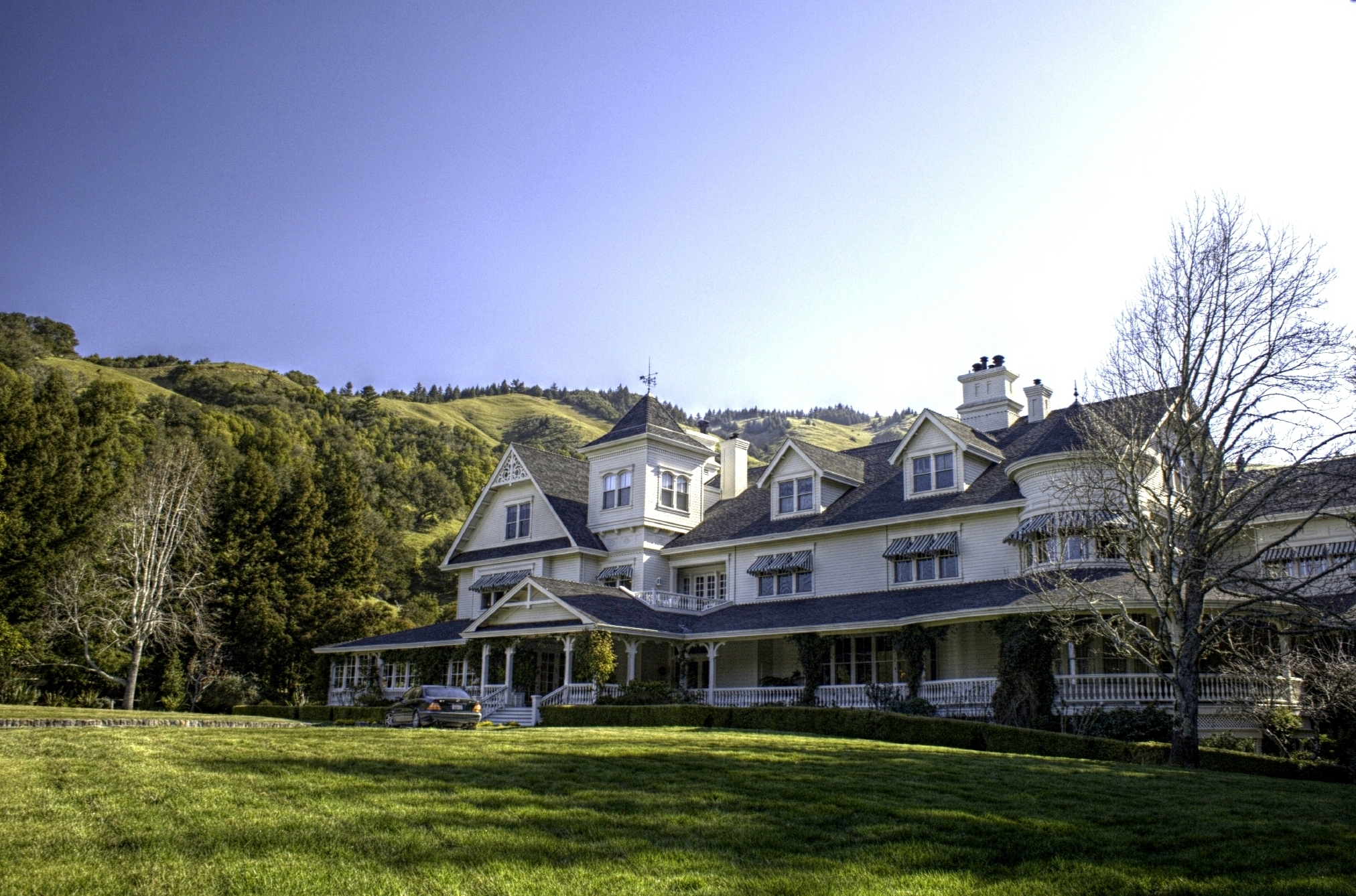
Skywalker Ranch Main House, 2009

The Skywalker Ranch is not a movie ranch in the conventional sense, but rather is the location of the production facilities for film and television producer George Lucas in Marin County, California. Based in secluded but open land near Nicasio in Northern California, the property encompasses over 4,700 acres (19 km^{2}), of which all but 15 acres (61,000 m^{2}) remain undeveloped.

In 2019, the Skywalker Ranch web site stated that it "occupied the 153,000-square-foot (14,200 m^{2}) Technical Building, which features a world-class scoring stage, six feature mix stages, 15 sound design suites, 50 editing suites, an ADR stage, two Foley stages, and the 300-seat Stag Theater. The property also includes the iconic Main House and the beautiful Lake Ewok".

=== Southfork Ranch ===
Main house at Southfork Ranch

Southfork Ranch is a working ranch in Parker, Texas, a northern suburb of Dallas, that is used for some location filming. It was the backdrop for the 1980s prime time soap opera Dallas and its 2010s continuation.

As of 2019, it was a tourist attraction.

=== Circle M City ===
Circle M City, in Sanford, North Carolina, is the set for the Christian movie Cowboy Trail. Backing up to 50 acres (200,000 m^{2}) of land, this town features a church that seats 50 people, a mercantile, bank, saloon, livery, jail, costumes, and horses.

In 2019, it was a venue for various events and weddings.

=== Other Santa Clarita ranches ===
In addition to the original Monogram Ranch/Melody Ranch and Republic Pictures Ranch/Disney Golden Oak Ranch, a number of other movie ranches have been established in the Santa Clarita Valley. According to the L.A. Times in 2012 there were about 10 movie ranches there, including Blue Cloud Movie Ranch, Rancho Deluxe, and Sable Ranch.

Productions that have done some filming at the Rancho Deluxe studio include "SWAT", "Timeless", "LA to Vegas", "MasterChef", and seasons one and two of HBO's "Westworld". A 2016 fire destroyed trees and brush but not the structures.

Sable Ranch is a 400-acre property in Santa Clarita that featured lakes, a western town, a hacienda, barn, fields, and a train. The large field enabled the construction of large sets and has been used by numerous film and television series including The A-Team and in subsequent years 24 and Wipeout. The original Old West town and other structures were destroyed in the Sand Fire wildfire on July 24, 2016.

== See also ==
- Studio zone
- Sound stage
- Backlot
- Location shooting
- List of productions using the Vasquez Rocks as a filming location
