= Broken Arrow (TV series) =

American Western television series (1956–1958)

- Genre: Western
- Starring: John Lupton; Michael Ansara
- Country of origin: United States
- Original language: English
- No. of seasons: 2
- No. of episodes: 72

Production
- Running time: 30 minutes
- Production company: 20th Century-Fox Television

Original release
- Network: ABC
- Release: September 25, 1956 – June 24, 1958

Broken Arrow is an American Western television series that ran on ABC in prime time from September 25, 1956, to June 24, 1958, with reruns airing through September 18, 1960. The show was based on the 1947 novel Blood Brothers, by Elliott Arnold, which had been made into a film in 1950, starring James Stewart as Tom Jeffords and Jeff Chandler playing as Cochise.

== Synopsis ==
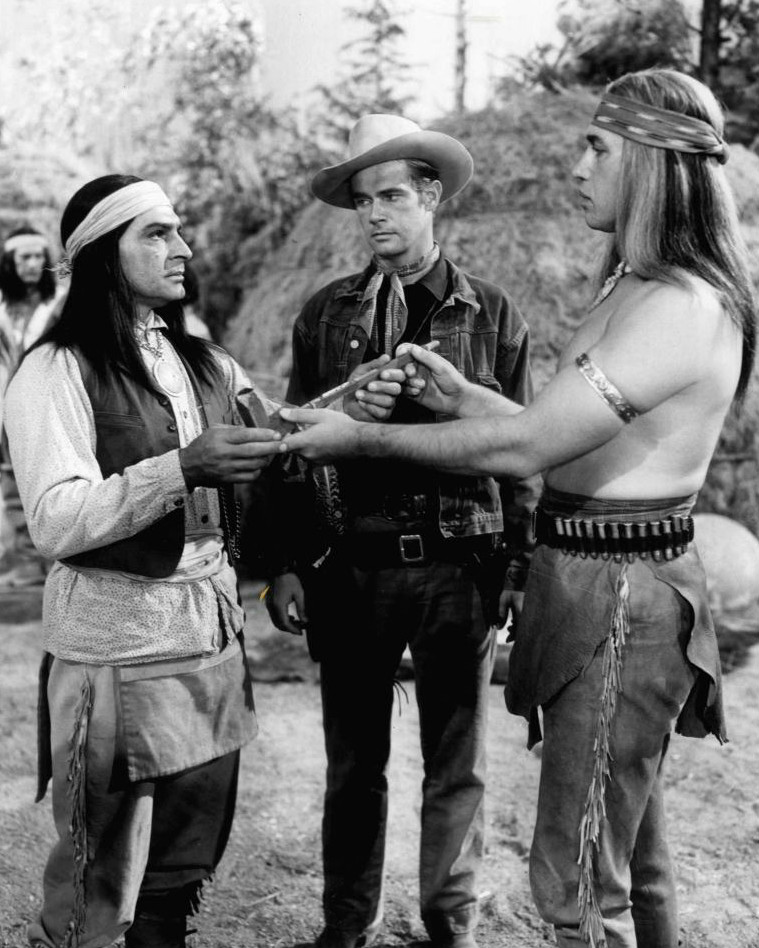
Anthony Caruso, John Lupton as Tom Jeffords and Michael Ansara as Cochise, 1957.

Broken Arrow was set in the 1870s. The main characters were Tom Jeffords, an Indian agent, and Cochise, an Apache Chief.

The program differed from other Westerns because Jeffords and Cochise were equal in stature and respected each other. They practiced tolerance of each other.

== Cast ==
- Tom Jeffords - John Lupton
- Cochise - Michael Ansara
- Duffield - Tom Fadden
- Nukaya - Steven Ritch
- Geronimo - Charles Horvath

== Episodes ==
=== Season 1 (1956–57) ===
No. overall	No. in season	Title	Directed by	Written by	Original release date
1	1	"The Mail Riders"	Alvin Ganzer	Teleplay by : Clarke Reynolds; Novel by : Elliott Arnold	September 25, 1956
Federal agent Tom Jeffords makes a deal with Apache chief Cochise to permit the mail riders to pass safely through Apache territory despite the mutual animosity of Apache and white. Robert F. Simon guest stars as Ben Slade.
2	2	"Battle at Apache Pass"	Richard L. Bare	Teleplay by : Clarke Reynolds; Novel by : Elliott Arnold	October 2, 1956
Jeffords has a group of settlers after him because they think he has given the Apaches information.
3	3	"Indian Agent"	Richard L. Bare	Teleplay by : Clarke Reynolds; Novel by : Elliott Arnold	October 9, 1956
Jeffords asks Cochise for help against Geronimo, and falls in love with an Apache priestess.
4	4	"The Captive"	Richard L. Bare	Teleplay by : Clarke Reynolds; Novel by : Elliott Arnold	October 23, 1956
Cochise threatens to go on the warpath if a white boy raised by the Apaches is not returned to the tribe. Trevor Bardette guest stars as Frank Whittier.
5	5	"Passage Deferred"	John English	Teleplay by : Jan Leman & Ted Thomas; Novel by : Elliott Arnold	October 30, 1956
Cochise catches a poor Irishman mining gold on Apache land. Jeffords steps in and tries to keep the Apaches from killing him. Chris Alcaide guest stars as Brown Eagle.
6	6	"Medicine Men"	John English	Teleplay by : John McGreevey; Novel by : Elliott Arnold	November 13, 1956
A conflict over whether the treatment by the medicine man or the army doctor is most effective ensues when smallpox develops in Cochise's camp.
7	7	"Hermano"	Hollingsworth Morse	Teleplay by : John Dunkel; Novel by : Elliott Arnold	November 20, 1956
A young Indian working as a scout for the Army is struggling between his loyalty to the Army and his loyalty to his brother, a member of Geronimo's renegade Indians.
8	8	"Caged"	John English	Teleplay by : John Dunkel; Novel by : Elliott Arnold	November 27, 1956
An Indian friend of Jeffords goes to San Francisco after being convinced he is to represent the Apaches at an Indian conference, but it is all a scheme to get him to San Francisco to be used as the star in a circus side show.
9	9	"Return from the Shadows"	Hollingsworth Morse	Teleplay by : William R. Cox; Novel by : Elliott Arnold	December 4, 1956
An Army lieutenant who lured five Indians into a trap using a flag of truce and then disappeared returns afters several years. He now has to face the only Indian who survived the trap---Cochise.
10	10	"Cry Wolf"	William Thiele	Story by : Milton & Barbara Merlin; Teleplay by : Warren Wilson; Novel by : Elliott Arnold	December 11, 1956
The town derelict's imaginative son tries to convince the town that he saw two strange looking animals, one that looked like a dinosaur and the other like a camel. At the same time he is also saying he witnessed a murder.
11	11	"The Conspirators"	Hollingsworth Morse	Teleplay by : Harold Swanton; Novel by : Elliott Arnold	December 18, 1956
Jeffords goes to San Francisco to investigate an overdue shipment of denim pants meant for Cochise's tribe and finds larcenous corruption and an old love.
12	12	"The Raiders"	Richard L. Bare & John English	Orville H. Hampton & William Leicester	December 25, 1956
The region's produce suppliers, disguised as Aravaipa Apache, carry out raids to provoke conflict, with the aim of gaining profit from the troubles.
13	13	"Apache Massacre"	Joe Parker	Teleplay by : John Meredyth Lucas; Novel by : Elliott Arnold	January 1, 1957
When Geronimo's braves raid into Cochise's Chiricahua land, some settlement folks who blame the Chiricahua retaliate on a group of Cochise's innocents and nearly precipitate a war with the Apache tribes.
14	14	"The Rescue"	Hollingsworth Morse	Teleplay by : Gerald Drayson Adams; Novel by : Elliott Arnold	January 8, 1957
On a mission to a Mexican general for a plan to trap warring Apaches between Mexico and Arizona Jeffords learns that the foe is headed to New Mexico to where he must now go and on the way gains the company of a naive young woman survivor.
15	15	"Apache Dowry"	Hollingsworth Morse	Teleplay by : David T. Chantler & Clark E. Reynolds; Novel by : Elliott Arnold	January 15, 1957
A theft of horses as a wedding gift for a tribeswoman by one of Cochise's braves imperils peace with the Chiricahua and the relationship of Jeffords and Cochise.
16	16	"The Trial"	Albert S. Rogell	Teleplay by : Peter R. Brooke; Novel by : Elliott Arnold	January 22, 1957
A man stirs near vigilante justice by falsely accusing the son of one Cochise's elders of murders to divert attention away from the responsible renegade Apache and the man's illegal dealing with that renegade. Leonard Nimoy guest stars.
17	17	"The Missionaries"	Hollingsworth Morse	Teleplay by : Herbert Little & David Victor; Novel by : Elliott Arnold	January 29, 1957
Against Jeffords' advice, a brother and sister wish to take an Apache boy back east to be given a white man's education.
18	18	"The Challenge"	Albert S. Rogell	Teleplay by : Wallace Bosco; Novel by : Elliott Arnold	February 5, 1957
Renegade Apache leader Chato has Jeffords arrange with Cochise a peace meeting which is a ruse to persuade Cochise's braves to the warpath.
19	19	"The Doctor"	William Beaudine	Teleplay by : Jess Carneol & Kay Lenard; Novel by : Elliott Arnold	February 12, 1957
A Chiricahua man who has just completed medical school finds himself lacking acceptance of both Apache and white populations while the injury of Chiricahua and white playmates exacerbates the predicament. Gilman Rankin of Tombstone Territory fame guest stars as Tawanga.
20	20	"Powder Keg"	Hollingsworth Morse	Teleplay by : Arthur E. Orloff; Novel by : Elliott Arnold	February 19, 1957
When a retired Apache hating general visits the territory as a now Washington official and is shot by an unrequited love, an Apache brave is blamed by the biased settlers.
21	21	"Legacy of a Hero"	William Beaudine	Teleplay by : Wilton Schiller; Novel by : Elliott Arnold	February 26, 1957
The son of a storekeeper who was killed by white reservation poachers when defending an Apache brave is captured and held for ransom when he pursues the poachers.
22	22	"Rebellion"	Hollingsworth Morse	Teleplay by : DeVallon Scott; Novel by : Elliott Arnold	March 5, 1957
While Jeffords tries to persuade a novice and misguided agent for the Pinal Apache to allow the tribe ailing from conditions in low wetlands to move to high ground, braves kidnap the agent's daughter as ransom for agreement to the move.
23	23	"Ghostface"	Hollingsworth Morse	Teleplay by : John Dunkel; Novel by : Elliott Arnold	March 12, 1957
During a harsh winter, Jeffords is compelled to use his own means to provide food for the reservation and keep the peace while an army officer and government agencies delay the delivery of promised provisions. Robert F. Simon guest stars as General Everitt.
24	24	"Johnny Flagstaff"	William Beaudine	Teleplay by : Warren Wilson; Novel by : Elliott Arnold	March 19, 1957
To validate the annexation of Cochise's land a western folk hero of exaggerated fame is sent for a phony review of the peace but the hero is targeted for assassination when he delivers a review opposite of that for which he was tasked.
25	25	"The Desperado"	Albert S. Rogell	Teleplay by : Peter R. Brooke; Novel by : Elliott Arnold	March 26, 1957
Jeffords is placed between Cochise and the army when Cochise harbors due to a debt of honor a ruthless outlaw wanted by the army for the murder of an army doctor responsible for the man's dishonorable discharge. Paul Richards guest stars as Bret Younger.
26	26	"Fathers and Sons"	Frank McDonald	Story by : Lawrence Goldman; Teleplay by : John Dunkel; Novel by : Elliott Arnold	April 2, 1957
Cochise's son and young braves kidnap an influential white man whom Jeffords has brought to negotiate the man's plan to clear the reservation for settlement which act creates a life and death confrontation of Chiricahua fathers and sons.
27	27	"Quarantine"	William Beaudine	Teleplay by : Robert Leslie Bellem & DeVallon Scott; Novel by : Elliott Arnold	April 9, 1957
The Chiricahua have a hard time understanding why their cattle herd must be destroyed when hoof and mouth disease strikes so braves try to spirit the herd to Mexico while a small boy hides his bull.
28	28	"Ordeal"	William Beaudine	Teleplay by : John Dunkel; Novel by : Elliott Arnold	April 16, 1957
Cochise and Jeffords capture a man who must be taken to Tucson to save a Chiricahua brave who the man has falsely accused of murder but in the process all the horses are lost, Cochise is wounded and there is minimal water for the three.
29	29	"The Assassin"	Frank McDonald	Story by : Elliott Arnold; Teleplay by : Sam Peckinpah; Novel by : Elliott Arnold	April 23, 1957
Jeffords investigation of tip that a man hired by an outlaw gang to assassinate Cochise is on the most recent stage arrival perplexes him because none of the passengers seem to have an assassin profile.
30	30	"The Archeologist"	Frank McDonald	Teleplay by : Ellis Marcus; Novel by : Elliott Arnold	April 30, 1957
An archaeologist sent by Washington to produce a report on Apache culture disregards Chiricahua protocol and beliefs and so puts Cochise in awkward position between Jeffords and the medicine man.
31	31	"Apache Girl"	Frank McDonald	Story by : Elliott Arnold; Teleplay by : Curtis Kenyon; Novel by : Elliott Arnold	May 7, 1957
Cochise's niece wants to live among white people to learn their ways, though Cochise disagrees. This leads to conflict between settlement ruffians and a Chiricahua suitor.
32	32	"The Broken Wire"	William Beaudine	Teleplay by : Warren Wilson; Novel by : Elliott Arnold	May 14, 1957
Jeffords persuades Cochise to convince the Coyotero chief to permit telegraph lines through Coyotero land. But war threatens after two lineman who accidentally start a destructive fire blame the Coyotero chief's pacifistic son. John Doucette guest stars as Bobo Conway.
33	33	"Attack on Fort Grant"	William Beaudine	Teleplay by : Jess Carneol & Kay Lenard; Novel by : Elliott Arnold	May 21, 1957
Jeffords and Cochise try to warn the colonel at Fort Grant that Geronimo plans an attack on the fort. But, encouraged by his wife, the colonel decides to go after Geronimo himself, despite Cochise's warning that this is probably just what the renegade is hoping for, as it will leave the fort vulnerable to attack.

=== Season 2 (1957–58) ===
No. overall	No. in season	Title	Directed by	Written by	Original release date
34	1	"White Man's Magic"	Hollingsworth Morse	Story by : Anthony R. Cangialosi & John S. Waters; Teleplay by : Arthur Orloff; Novel by : Elliott Arnold	October 1, 1957
An army doctor's bride is held captive to force the man to treat Geronimo's gunshot wound. Cochise and Jeffords are captured and face death when they trail him. Nan Leslie guest stars as Peggy.
35	2	"Conquistador"	Richard L. Bare	Teleplay by : Bob Eisenbach; Novel by : Elliot Arnold	October 8, 1957
A Mexican ranch owner is pressured by his foreman to not allow Cochise to move and water his cattle on the ranch property, by threatening to tell the don's daughter that her mother was Apache. Leonard Nimoy guest stars as Nahilzay.
36	3	"Apache Child"	Richard L. Bare	Teleplay by : Gerald Drayson Adams; Novel by : Elliot Arnold	October 15, 1957
A brave exiled from Cochise's stronghold takes Jeffords as prisoner, because he falsely believes he is responsible for an ambush on his exile group. He wants to exchange Jeffords for his daughter, who the brave falsely believes was snatched in the ambush.
37	4	"Ghost Sickness"	Richard L. Bare	Teleplay by : Roderick Peterson; Novel by : Elliot Arnold	October 22, 1957
Jeffords convinces a reluctant Cochise to re-investigate the case of a father and son held to be traitors to their Apache ways. The son claims the man held to be the hero was the real traitor, costing the lives of ten warriors, and he hopes to avenge and clear his late father's name.
38	5	"Black Moment"	Richard L. Bare	Teleplay by : Jack Laird & Wilton Schiller; Novel by : Elliot Arnold	October 29, 1957
A man who kills an elderly prospector for a valuable locket alleges it is Cochise who committed the murder. His associates then determine to kill Cochise for the deed. Mort Mills guest stars as Halley.
39	6	"The Arsenal"	Richard L. Bare	Teleplay by : John McGreevey; Novel by : Elliot Arnold	November 5, 1957
Gun runners intent on supplying arms to the factions in a Mexican power struggle steal and buy all the guns and ammunition in the area and use outlaw Chiricahuas to blame Cochise's group.
40	7	"Devil's Eye"	Hollingsworth Morse	Teleplay by : Harry Kronman; Novel by : Elliot Arnold	November 12, 1957
Jeffords' pledge of his life to protect a photographer accused by the tribe of cursing souls through his photography is complicated by the disappearance of a Chiricahua boy who was photographed. Frank Cady of Green Acres fame guest stars as Thaddeus Parker.
41	8	"The Teacher"	Hollingsworth Morse	Story by : Peter R. Brooke; Teleplay by : Sam Peckinpah; Novel by : Elliot Arnold	November 19, 1957
Cochise asks for a teacher to instruct in the ways of white culture. To his chagrin, the one he gets is not only a woman, but a woman who holds fast to cultural values that demean Apache customs. Phyllis Avery guest stars as a schoolteacher named Myra Jane Benson.
42	9	"The Bounty Hunters"	Richard L. Bare	Teleplay by : Robert Leslie Bellem & DeVallon Scott; Novel by : Elliot Arnold	November 26, 1957
After a Chiricahua brave is scalped on the reservation, Cochise and Jeffords go to Mexico to confront a hacienda owner who pays a bounty for Apache scalps and are caught in the middle of a Coyotero raid. Ray Teal of Bonanza fame guest stars as Fenster.
43	10	"Renegades Return"	Hollingsworth Morse	Story by : Silvia Richards; Teleplay by : Arthur Orloff; Novel by : Elliot Arnold	December 3, 1957
When Geronimo's braves conduct a foray into Chiricahua land to steal horses, Jeffords must swear in Cochise and a limited number of Chiricahua braves so that they can be legally off the reservation to pursue the renegades and prevent a defection from Cochise.
44	11	"Smoke Signal"	Richard L. Bare	Teleplay by : Harry Kronman; Novel by : Elliot Arnold	December 10, 1957
A hold out group of confederate soldiers come out of Mexico and raid the Chiricahua reservation, which requires Jeffords to go to Washington to ask for help from President Grant to prevent Cochise from breaking the peace. Merry Anders guest stars as Amy Breece.
45	12	"Son of Cochise"	Hollingsworth Morse	Teleplay by : John K. Butler; Novel by : Elliot Arnold	December 17, 1957
Jeffords must arrest Cochise for destroying a cavalry supply wagon. Cochise is silent on the reason: to prevent his son, the war leader of the Membres Apaches, from being involved in an ambush on soldiers. Robert Knapp guest stars as Lieutenant Neal.
46	13	"White Savage"	Albert S. Rogell	Story by : Ed Earl Repp; Teleplay by : Robert Leslie Bellem & DeVallon Scott; Novel by : Elliot Arnold	December 24, 1957
An army major with a maniacal hatred of Apaches claims to suffer amnesia when captured by the Chiricahua, and thus is considered a protected being by them. But things go awry when his memory returns. Gregg Palmer guest stars as Lieutenant Savage.
47	14	"Indian Medicine"	Albert S. Rogell	Teleplay by : Mona Fisher; Novel by : Elliot Arnold	December 31, 1957
When a rancher becomes deathly ill, his daughter says that to keep the ranch going she can no longer honor her father's word to supply beef to the Chiricahua. Jeffords and Cochise are later suspected of poisoning the rancher.
48	15	"Water Witch"	Ralph Murphy	Teleplay by : Harry Kronman; Novel by : Elliot Arnold	January 7, 1958
During a drought Cochise requests the help of an eccentric alcoholic diviner, despite the skepticism of both settlers and braves, while the settlers attempt to divert a stream from the Chiricahua stronghold.
49	16	"Kingdom of Terror"	Richard L. Bare	Teleplay by : Warren Wilson; Novel by : Elliot Arnold	January 14, 1958
Jeffords and Cochise go to free Chiricahaus imprisoned in land in the middle of Arizona treated as foreign country because of a Mexican War treaty and discover that criminals fraudulently preserve the territory with a fake heir.
50	17	"Bad Boy"	Ralph Murphy	Teleplay by : Wallace Bosco; Novel by : Elliot Arnold	January 21, 1958
When a boy from a criminal family is caught stealing, Jeffords takes custody of him to prevent his imprisonment. But he then farms the boy to Cochise to teach him life lessons, to the mortification of his parents and the settlement folk.
51	18	"Massacre"	Ralph Murphy	Teleplay by : Herbert Purdom; Novel by : Elliot Arnold	January 28, 1958
A cavalry unit returning from an ambush mistakes an Apache group waiting for peace talks as a war party and slaughters the group. Cochise is persuaded to talk to Chief Nana in an effort to convince Nana that there is still peace.
52	19	"Shadow of Cochise"	Ralph Murphy	Teleplay by : Herbert Purdom; Novel by : Elliot Arnold	February 4, 1958
Cochise suspects something is amiss when an outlaw matriarch has Jeffords kidnapped to use as a bargaining chip for the life of her son. The son is being held by a Coyotero chief whose life Jeffords once saved.
53	20	"Warrant for Arrest"	Hollingsworth Morse	Teleplay by : Philip Keith Palmer; Novel by : Elliot Arnold	February 11, 1958
Jeffords is falsely accused of stealing supplies meant for the Chiricahua reservation, which spurs efforts by Cochise to thwart Jeffords' prosecution, despite Jeffords' insistence on following the judicial process.
54	21	"Escape"	William Beaudine	Teleplay by : Robert Leslie Bellem & DeVallon Scott; Novel by : Elliot Arnold	February 18, 1958
Cochise's son Tahzay enters into a competition to be village chief, but his opponent Koteeja plans to cheat and murder him. When Jeffords convinces Cochise of the treachery the two try to thwart the plot.
55	22	"Aztec Treasure"	Ralph Murphy	Teleplay by : Jack Laird & Wilton Schiller; Novel by : Elliot Arnold	February 25, 1958
Mexican emissaries cajole Cochise into returning a valuable golden Aztec idol, taken in an Apache raid, for a Mexican heritage museum. But the idol is stolen by bandits when leaving the Chiricahua stronghold.
56	23	"Hired Killer"	Charles F. Haas	Teleplay by : Roderick W. Peterson; Novel by : Elliot Arnold	March 4, 1958
Two beef purveyors to the military hire a gunman to kill Cochise to precipitate an Indian war and thus draw troops to which they can sell to the area. Chris Alcaide guest stars again this time as John Brett.
57	24	"Panic"	Ralph Murphy	Robert Leslie Bellem	March 11, 1958
A Chiricahua brave acting as an army scout is with an officer when the officer dies after being in an area with reported bubonic plague. The brave is quarantined but escapes and flees to Tucson where fear spreads among the citizens.
58	25	"The Duel"	Ralph Murphy	Teleplay by : Herbert Purdom; Novel by : Elliot Arnold	March 18, 1958
A shopkeeper's romance with a Chiricahua girl causes trouble and reminds Tom of his courting days.
59	26	"The Iron Maiden"	Richard W. Farrell	Teleplay by : Jack Laird & Wilton Schiller; Novel by : Elliot Arnold	March 25, 1958
A murderous Modoc woman wanders into Cochise's camp and causes a jurisdictional dispute among a Modoc search party, the Apaches and the U.S. Army.
60	27	"The Sisters"	Richard L. Bare	Teleplay by : Warren Wilson; Novel by : Elliot Arnold	April 1, 1958
Two nuns arrive on a stage from Philadelphia to return a gold statue and run a mission now on Chiricahua land. They must contend with the skepticism of Cochise and with a ruthless fortune hunter who arrived on the same stage.
61	28	"War Trail"	Joseph Kane	John Dunkel	April 8, 1958
An army major plots war with the Chiricahua for the dual purpose of avenging his damaged career, for which he blames Cochise, and hiding his complicity with a crooked army contractor to make money from the tribe's supplies.
62	29	"Turncoat"	Ralph Murphy	John Dunkel	April 15, 1958
A brave who deserted the Chiricahuas during war returns to plead for inclusion in the tribe so he can marry. But he is coldly rejected, and draws the murderous hatred of a brave to whom the woman was promised by her father.
63	30	"Power"	Joseph Kane	John Dunkel	April 22, 1958
The brave Natan who Cochise appoints as interim chief when Cochise is wounded in a Geronimo raid betrays the trust given him by siding with a renegade faction.
64	31	"Bear Trap"	Ralph Murphy	Robert Leslie Bellem & DeVallon Scott	April 29, 1958
A young brave loses his arm while saving Jeffords' life from an attacking bear. He then feels shame for his condition while being shunned by the tribe for cheating the bear of its tribute.
65	32	"Old Enemy"	Ralph Murphy	Teleplay by : John Dunkel; Novel by : Elliot Arnold	May 6, 1958
A prospector whom Cochise fought in his youth defends his claim on Chiricahua land.
66	33	"Blood Brother"	Bernard L. Kowalski	Story by : DeVallon Scott; Teleplay by : Herbert Purdom & DeVallon Scott; Novel by : Elliot Arnold	May 13, 1958
A US Cavalry general posts troops on the Chiricahua reservation, distrustful of Cochise.
67	34	"Courage of Ling Tang"	Charles F. Haas	Teleplay by : Wallace Bosco; Novel by : Elliot Arnold	May 20, 1958
A Chinese cook, saved from renegades by Cochise and Jeffords, is bound by Chinese culture to protect Cochise in the future. But he is put in a dilemma when his mining crew, working Chiricahua land, plan Cochise's murder.
68	35	"Backlash"	Ralph Murphy	Herbert Purdom	May 27, 1958
An elderly Pinal Apache chief is duped by an ambitious brave to summon Jeffords for peace talks. But it's a ruse by the brave to kill Jeffords and use the murder as a catalyst to inspire a larger portion of the Apache tribes to war.
69	36	"Manhunt"	Albert S. Rogell	Herbert Purdom	June 3, 1958
Cuchillo, a treacherous Chiricahua, convinces young Miguel that he has killed a white man from whom Cuchillo has stolen dynamite, so that Miguel will flee and Cuchillo can hide from Cochise his plan to deliver the dynamite to Geronimo. James Philbrook guest stars as Clem Harrison.
70	37	"The Outlaw"	Bernard L. Kowalski	Herbert Purdom	June 10, 1958
Jeffords joins an area posse to pursue a gang leader who sold liquor to Chiricahua braves, hoping to prevent Cochise from rashly pursuing him. But when the posse fails and Jeffords is wounded, Cochise takes over.
71	38	"Jeopardy"	Ralph Murphy	Herbert Purdom & Orville H. Hampton	June 17, 1958
A Chiricahua girl mistakenly believes that Jeffords has killed her brother, so Jeffords must find the killer to quell the girl's desire for vengeance against him.
72	39	"The Transfer"	Sam Peckinpah	Sam Peckinpah	June 24, 1958
When Jeffords is reassigned as Indian agent to the Utes, his replacement proves to be both without the necessary sensibilities and bureaucratic adaptability, so hostilities ensue as the Chiricahuas threaten to break the peace.

== Production ==
The series was based on the novel Blood Brother by Elliott Arnold. Series co-star John Lupton noted that the production tried to stay as true to the book as possible.

Mel Epstein was the producer; directors included Alvin Ganzer, and writers included Clark E. Reynolds. The show was filmed at 20th Century Fox Studios. The sponsor was General Electric's Appliance and Television Receiver Division.

The pilot included some stock footage that was used in the Broken Arrow film, and Lupton wore the costume that Stewart wore in the film. Use of the costume continued in the series.

Lupton noted that at one point episodes began concentrating on Jeffords, but the original format was restored after the audience began to diminish.

Location shooting took place at Fox Ranch in Malibu Canyon and Vaquez Rocks.

== Broadcast ==
The pilot for Broken Arrow was broadcast on May 2, 1956, as an episode of The 20th Century Fox Hour. Lupton portrayed Jeffords, with Ricardo Montalban as Cochise and Anthony Caruso as Geronimo.

Broken Arrow initially was on Tuesdays from 9 to 9:30 p.m. Eastern time. From April 1960 through the end of its run it was on Sundays from 7 to 7:30 p.m. E. T Reruns were shown on Sunday afternoons during the 1959–60 TV season. Its competition included To Tell the Truth on CBS and Dotto on NBC.

Cochise was the name used for the series in syndication.

== Critical response ==
Donald Kirkley wrote in The Baltimore Sun, "Broken Arrow is hitting the bulls-eye and setting a good example." Kirkley noted that "some soft-pedalling" occurred in adapting content from the book to the TV show, but he concluded, "It's a good story, and if it helps to give some viewers a new perspective on the Indian's version of our history, it will be doing an excellent service."

A review in the trade publication Broadcasting noted "obvious handicaps (and a too obvious plot)" and called Broken Arrow "a passable show". It said that Lupton's "appearance does not convey the rugged impression the job demands."
