= Santa Susana Pass =

Mountain pass in Los Angeles County, California, United States

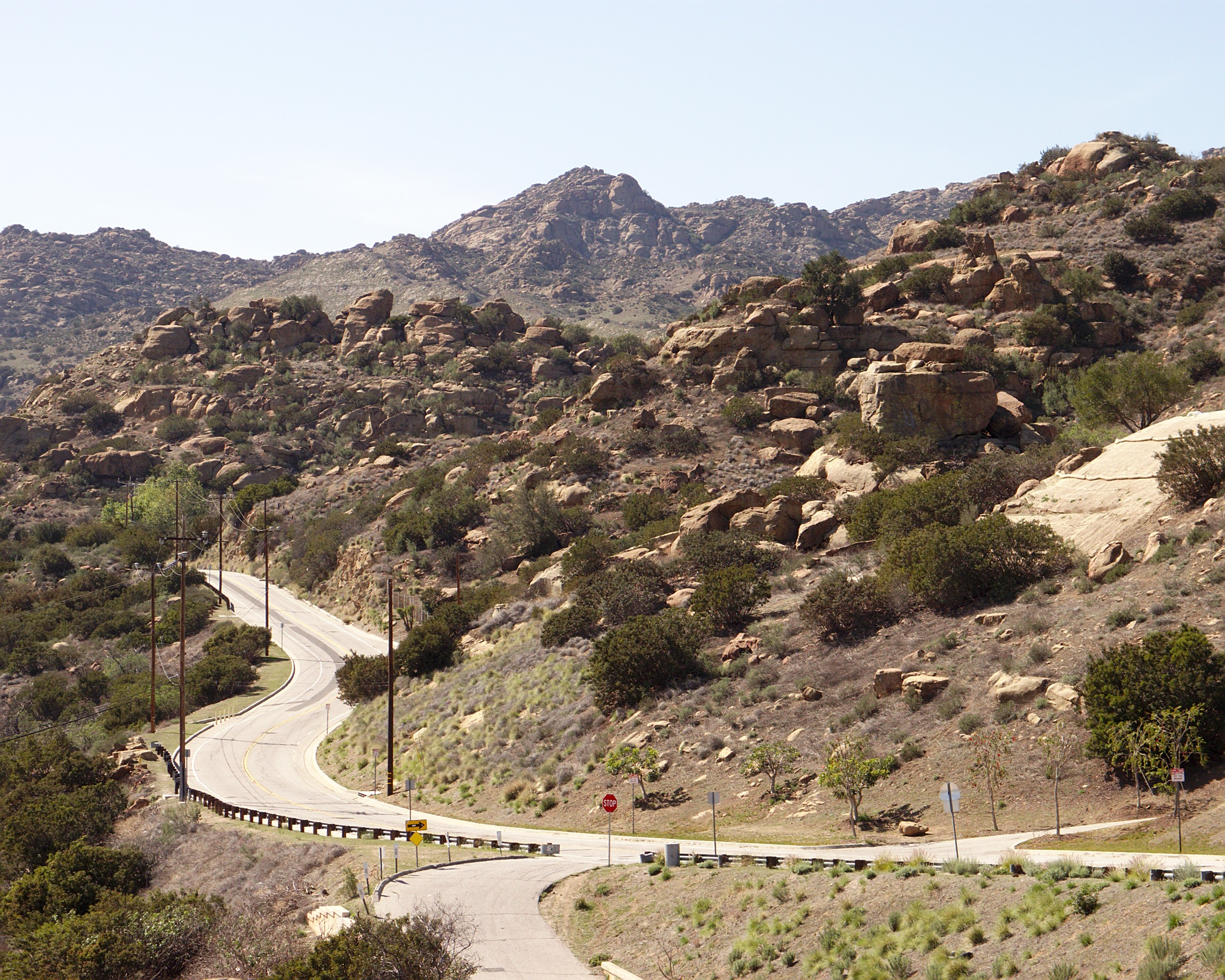
- Santa Susana Pass Road looking west from Topanga Canyon Boulevard.
- Interactive map of Santa Susana Pass
- Elevation: 1,200 feet (370 m)
- Traversed by: SR 118

Third Approach
- Location: Simi Valley / Chatsworth, Los Angeles, California, United States
- Range: Santa Susana Mountains/Simi Hills
- Coordinates: 34°16′05″N 118°37′59″W

The Santa Susana Pass, originally Simi Pass, is a low mountain pass in the Simi Hills of Southern California, connecting the San Fernando Valley and Los Angeles neighborhood of Chatsworth, to the city of Simi Valley and eponymous valley.

It has been featured in numerous movies, including Shooting High (1940), Man's Genesis (1912), Judith of Bethulia (1914), Jack and the Beanstalk (1917) and Range Warfare (1935).

== Natural history ==
The pass is the division between the Simi Hills to the south and Santa Susana Mountains to the north, and forms the most critical wildlife corridor and habitat linkage between them. The scenery is made up of sandstone formations in massive outcroppings and numerous boulders, with California chaparral and woodlands ecoregion, with oak savannahs, chaparral shrub forest, and native bunchgrass plant communities in between. The perennial water sources provide diverse habitat for birds, mammals, and reptiles.

== History ==
=== Native American ===
The Santa Susana Pass was at the juncture of the Native American Tongva-Fernandeño, Chumash-Venturaño, and Tataviam-Fernandeño tribal lands and was first crossed by their trail route, and used for an estimated 8,000 years.

=== Under Spain and Mexico ===
The first Europeans to use the pass were members of the Spanish Portolà expedition (1769–1770), the first European land entry and exploration of the present-day state of California. The expedition traversed the pass on January 15, 1770, heading east to a campground that later became part of Mission San Fernando Rey de España. After secularization of the mission in 1834, San Fernando Valley rancheros used the trail. A rough wagon road evolved.

== Early statehood ==
American newspapers in California first referred to the pass as Simi Pass from 1857 when the Los Angeles Star wrote of the capture of the outlaw Juan Flores there. That name continued in use, declining from the late 1880s until 1911 in the Eagle Rock Sentinel. It began to be referred to as Santa Susana Pass in the Los Angeles Herald 18 September 1887, being used with increasing frequency thereafter.

In 1859, the California Legislature appropriated $15,000 (with additional funding provided by Los Angeles and Santa Barbara Counties) towards improving the old wagon road into a new stagecoach road, now known as the Old Santa Susana Stage Road. The precipitous portion of the route down from the summit on the San Fernando Valley side was called the Devil's Slide; horses were usually blindfolded and chains were used to augment brakes on the steep descent. Passengers debarked and walked.

The outbreak of the American Civil War in 1861 disrupted mail service along the Butterfield Overland Mail's southern stagecoach route from St. Louis, Missouri via El Paso, Fort Yuma and Los Angeles and on to San Francisco via the Tejon Pass, which had begun its run in 1858. To compensate, the government contracted the Butterfield Company to carry mail between Los Angeles and San Francisco via the new wagon road over the Santa Susana Pass. The first overland mail stage run through the pass took place on April 6, 1861. The main route climbs through what is now Santa Susana Pass State Historic Park, with a branch in L.A. City Park 'Chatsworth Park South.' It was an important artery linking the Los Angeles Basin and inland Ventura County, and was part of the main route for travel by stagecoach between Los Angeles and San Francisco from 1861 until the opening of rail traffic between the cities in 1876. The Old Santa Susana Stage Road is listed on the National Register of Historic Places. Part of the stage road is also a Historic-Cultural Monument of Ventura County and of the City of Los Angeles under the name 'Old Stagecoach Trail.'

=== Late 19th and 20th century ===
In 1893, a new road north with a better grade was surveyed, "The New Santa Susanna Pass Road through William's Canon", that bypassed the deteriorating Devil's Slide in 1895. It was commonly named the Chatsworth Grade Road, and when the Santa Susana Pass State Historic Park was established in 1998, they named this road El Camino Nuevo (the New Road). The 1895 New Road continued in use until the current Santa Susana Pass Road was built in 1917. The 1917 road was the first automobile route between the San Fernando and Simi Valleys. It also was the main northbound 'coast road' to Santa Barbara and San Francisco, until the Conejo Grade in Ventura County between Conejo Valley and the Oxnard Plain on "Camino Real Viejo" (the Old Royal Road, now U.S. Route 101), was improved. In 1968 State Route 118, the "Simi Valley–San Fernando Valley Freeway" opened, north of the old auto road as the latest route across the Pass. In 1994 it was renamed the "Ronald Reagan Freeway".

The pass area became famous from being seen in many movies, primarily Westerns, filmed from the 1920s to the 1950s here at the Spahn, Iverson, Bell Moving Picture, and Corriganville Movie Ranches. The area became infamous in the late 1960s with the Manson Family headquartered at the Spahn Ranch, near the top of the stage road's Devil's Slide. To the south of the old stage road is Sage Ranch Park and the Santa Susana Field Laboratory. Immediately to the north of Route 118 at the pass top is Rocky Peak Park, a part of the Rim of the Valley Trail Corridor. The old wagon road and rocky hill environs are part of the Santa Susana Pass State Historic Park, for public exploration. The Southern Pacific Railroad began construction of three railroad tunnels through the pass in 1898 and opened the route in 1904. The railroad built the Santa Susana Depot in Rancho Simi on Los Angeles Avenue at Tapo Street in 1903.

== See also ==
- Bell Moving Picture Ranch – Bell Location Ranch
- Burro Flats Painted Cave
- Corriganville Movie Ranch
- History of the San Fernando Valley
- Iverson Movie Ranch
- Old Santa Susana Stage Road
- Santa Susana Pass State Historic Park
- Santa Susana Tunnel
- Spahn Movie Ranch
