= Santa Susana Pass State Historic Park =

State historic park in Los Angeles County, California, United States

Coordinates: 34°15′24″N 118°37′14″W

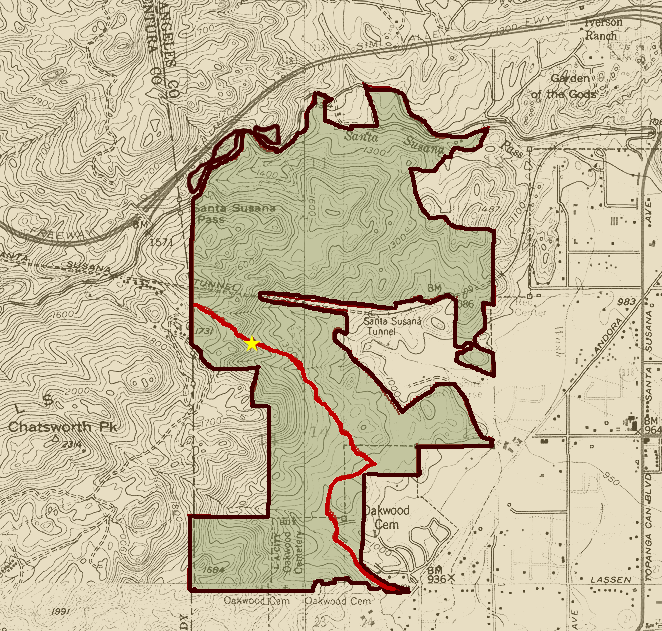
Santa Susana Pass State Historic Park with the Old Santa Susana Stage Road (in red). The star marks the historic plaque for the stage road.

Santa Susana Pass State Historic Park is a California State Park of 670.68 acres (2.7141 km^{2}) located in the city of Los Angeles, in Los Angeles County on the boundary between Ventura and Los Angeles counties, between the communities of Chatsworth and Simi Valley. Geologically, the park is located where the Simi Hills meet the Santa Susana Mountains. Here in the western part of the Transverse Ranges, the land is dominated by high, narrow ridges and deep canyons covered with an abundant variety of plant life. The park offers panoramic views of the rugged natural landscape as a striking contrast to the developed communities nearby. The park is also rich in archaeological, historical, and cultural significance.

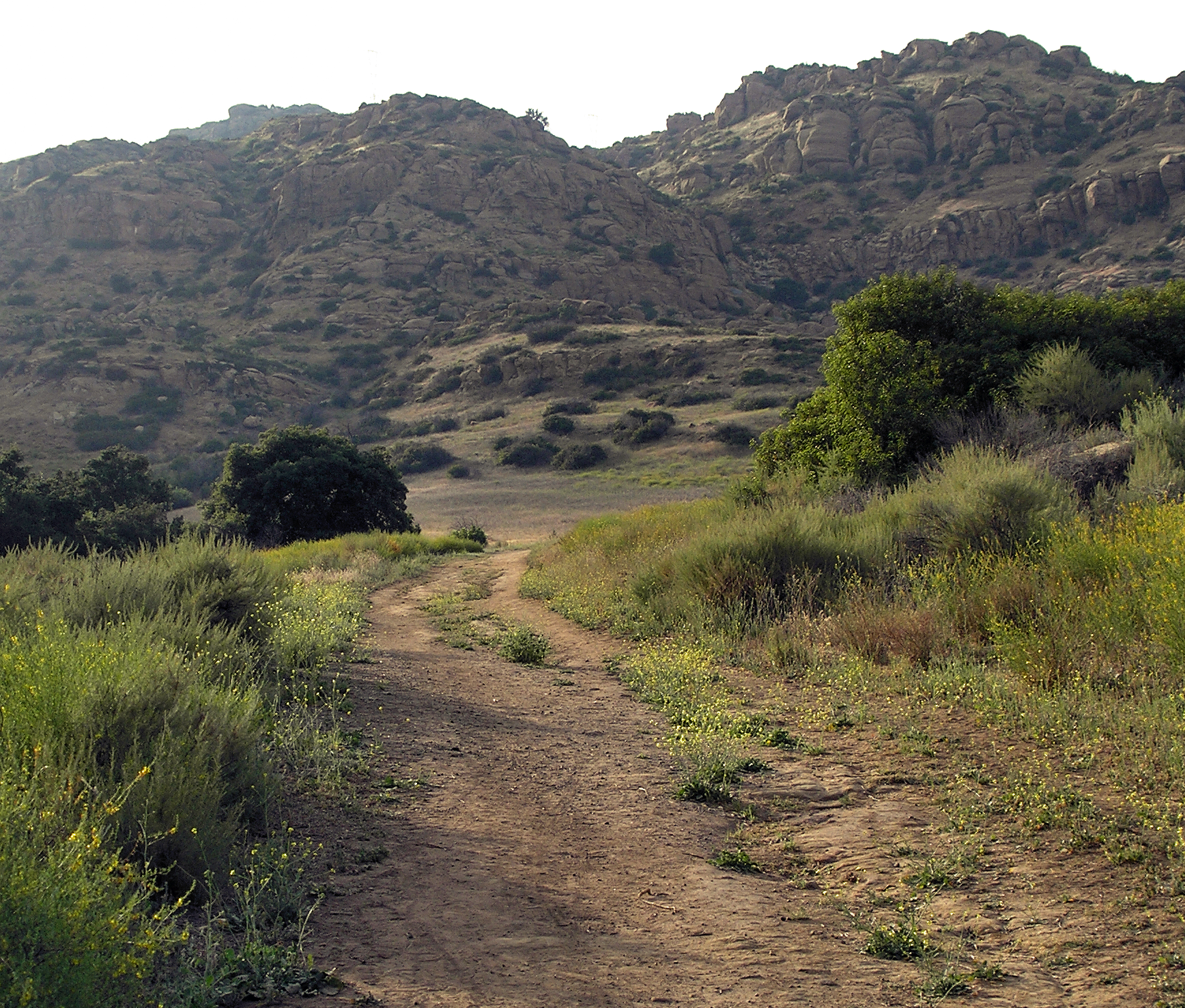
Old Santa Susana Stage Road and Simi Hills

== History ==
The park includes a 174-acre (0.70 km^{2}) National Register of Historic Places property consisting of historic features and sites. This includes the Fernandeno and Chumash people's trading routes and village sites remains.

It also includes portions of the Old Santa Susana Stage Road. The Santa Susana stagecoach road was the main route for mail and travelers between Los Angeles and the rest of Southern California northwest to Simi Valley, Santa Barbara, and the San Francisco Bay Area from 1861 until 1876, when the rail connections began between Los Angeles and the San Francisco Bay Area through the Newhall Pass opened. The stage road was declared City of Los Angeles Historic-Cultural Monument #92 (designated 01/05/1972) and Ventura County Historical Landmark #104 (designated 10/21/1986).

The park also includes land that was previously part of the Spahn Ranch, utilized for many decades as a movie ranch.

== Features ==
The State of California acquired portions of the park in 1979 and acquired additional parcels into the late 1990s. The property was formally classified as a State Historic Park in 1998. Many trails and vistas are available in the park. The NPS "Rim of the Valley" master plan for a hiking and equestrian trail corridor from the Santa Monica Mountains to the San Gabriel Mountains includes the park's trails and open space as an important link.

== Park entrances ==
The traditional entrance to Santa Susana Pass State Historic Park on Devonshire Street is closed during ongoing environmental cleanup of an old shooting range within city-owned Chatsworth Park South. The Foundation for the Preservation of the Santa Susana Mountains website suggests the following for "access to Santa Susana Pass State Historic Park:

- The main entrance through Chatsworth Park South and alternate entrance on Jeffery Mark Court are closed; however alternate entrances are available.
1. From Larwin Avenue: The most convenient alternate access location is on Larwin Avenue one block south of Devonshire Street, turn left (south) at the closed park Devonshire entrance onto Larwin Avenue and go one block until you come to a chain link fence on your right. This is very easy to locate because in addition to the fence, an old set of power lines runs directly overhead. Park along the curb and enter the park through the gap in the fence.
2. From Santa Susana Pass Road in the northwest corner of the park.
3. From Lilac Lane in the northwest quadrant of the park.
4. From near the intersection of Lassen, Andora and Valley Circle southwest of the Oakwood Memorial Cemetery entrance."

Closure proposal

Santa Susana Pass SHP was one of the 48 California state parks proposed for closure in January 2008 by California's Governor Arnold Schwarzenegger as part of a deficit reduction program. A reprieve has avoided this so far.

== See also ==
- Santa Susana, California
- Burro Flats Painted Cave
- History of the San Fernando Valley
- Old Santa Susana Stage Road
- Rocky Peak
- Santa Susana Pass
