= Santa Susana Tunnel =

Railroad tunnel in Southern California, US

- Interactive map of Santa Susana Tunnel

Overview
- Line: Coast Line
- Coordinates: Start: 34°15′48″N 118°37′20″W; End: 34°15′58″N 118°38′47″W
- Status: Active
- System: Union Pacific Railroad; Amtrak; Metrolink
- Crosses: Santa Susana Pass
- Start: Chatsworth, Los Angeles, California
- End: Simi Valley, California

Operation
- Constructed: 1900–1904
- Opened: March 20, 1904; 122 years ago
- Rebuilt: 1922
- Owner: Southern California Regional Rail Authority
- Traffic: Railroad
- Character: Cargo and passenger

Technical
- Length: 7,369 feet (2,246 m)
- No. of tracks: Single
- Track gauge: 1,435 mm (4 ft 8 1/2 in) standard gauge
- Operating speed: 40 miles per hour (64 km/h)

The Santa Susana Tunnel is a railroad tunnel that connects the Simi and San Fernando valleys in Southern California. The tunnel is credited with saving considerable time and distance between San Francisco and Los Angeles. It is 7,369 feet (2,246 m) long and runs through the Simi Hills and Santa Susana Mountains. The tunnel is located beneath the Santa Susana Pass.

== History ==
Before the construction of the Montalvo Cutoff, the most direct rail line between San Francisco and Los Angeles ran (from north to south) to Ventura, through the Santa Clara River Valley, to Saugus, California, through the San Fernando Tunnel and then to Burbank, for a distance of sixty-seven miles (108 km).

Construction of the tunnel began in 1900 by the Southern Pacific Transportation Company and was completed in 1904. The first train to use the tunnel was on March 20, 1904. With the completion of the tunnel, the distance between Montalvo and Burbank was reduced to sixty-one miles (98 km).

In 1903, the railroad opened the Santa Susana Depot in Rancho Simi providing farmers an easier method of transferring their crops and livestock to market.

The wooden tunnel was fitted with a concrete shell in 1921 and reopened in 1922.

In 1972, the tunnel underwent minor renovations.

In 1997, officials began seeking options to restore the tunnel due to its deterioration over time. Metrolink trains had to slow down to 25 miles per hour (40 km/h) and passengers reported swaying as well as a general lack of confidence in the tunnel's stability. Due to the separation of rock from the tunnel's concrete shell over time, the tunnel was considered vulnerable in the event of a serious earthquake. Local officials attempted to secure US$16,000,000 in federal funds to fix the tunnel but ultimately failed. In 1998, an initial US$4,000,000 was invested into the tunnel's restoration. Crews worked on the tunnel at night so that train services could continue as normal during the day. By 2000, the project's cost rose to US$14,000,000 as wooden railroad ties were replaced with steel ones, new water pumps were installed, loose soil was excavated, and the tunnel's shell was secured with new support bolts. Crews completed maintenance on the tunnel in October 2000. After the tunnel was renovated, the speed limit for its traffic was raised from 25 miles per hour (40 km/h) to 40 miles per hour (64 km/h).

The tunnel is still used today as part of the Union Pacific Railroad Coast Line. Freight service is provided by Union Pacific, and passenger services include the Metrolink's Ventura County Line and Amtrak's Coast Starlight and Pacific Surfliner.
