= What Comes Around Goes Around =

What Comes Around Goes Around may refer to:

- What Goes Around Comes Around, a 1979 album by Waylon Jennings
- What Comes Around Goes Around, a 1991 album by Tuff
- What Goes Around... Comes Around, a 2006 song by Justin Timberlake
