= Santa Susana, California =

- Unincorporated community Census-designated place
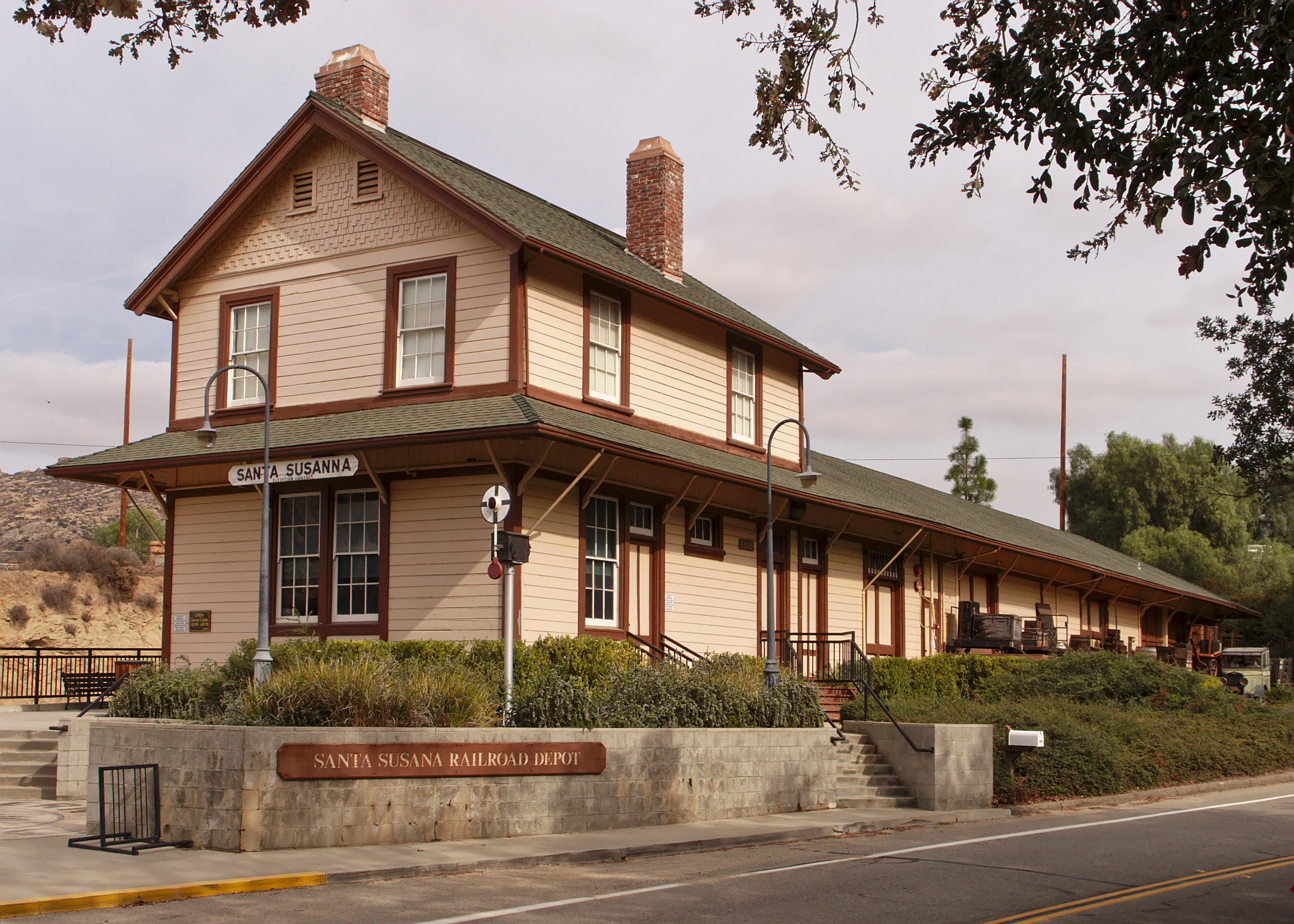
- Historic Santa Susana Railroad Station

- Location in Ventura County and the state of California

- Location within the state of California
- Coordinates: 34°15′29″N 118°39′59″W
- Country: United States
- State: California
- County: Ventura

Area
  - Total: 1.255 sq mi (3.250 km^{2})
  - Land: 1.255 sq mi (3.250 km^{2})
  - Water: 0 sq mi (0 km^{2}) 0%
- Elevation: 1,165 ft (355 m)

Population (2020)
  - Total: 1,160
  - Density: 924/sq mi (357/km^{2})
- Time zone: UTC-8 (Pacific (PST))
  - Summer (DST): UTC-7 (PDT)
- GNIS feature ID: 2585445

Santa Susana (Spanish for "St. Susan") is a former railroad town located mostly within the City of Simi Valley, in Ventura County, California, United States. A small portion of the community, outside the Simi Valley city limits to the south of the Ventura County Metrolink rail line, is an unincorporated area and census-designated place (CDP). The community is in the eastern part of the Simi Valley.

The town by the Santa Susana Mountains in the Simi Valley was founded in 1903, shortly after the Southern Pacific Company built the Santa Susana Depot. It is also spelled Santa Susanna, while it is currently more commonly referred to as the Santa Susana Knolls, which is the officially designated name, or the Simi Knolls. The name of Santa Susana is now more generally applied to a larger area at the very east end of the Simi Valley (often called east of East Simi Valley) in easternmost Ventura County, which was the name of the early settlement located at Tapo Street and East Los Angeles Avenue that is now within the city limits. The historic Santa Susana Depot was located there before being moved farther east along the coast route railroad and made into a museum. The Simi Valley train station opened in 1993 about midway between the historic site and the museum location next to Santa Susana Knolls. As of the 2020 census, Santa Susana had a population of 1,160. It is a sparsely populated rural area with rustic housing and no set-houses, in a hilly and relatively forested part of the valley.

The area was inhabited by the Chumash Indians as early as 500 AD and there have been numerous Chumash artifacts found in the area, in addition to the pictographs in Burro Flats Painted Cave. In the 1920s, the Knolls became home to brothels and also a religious cult. During the late 1960s Charles Manson and the Manson Family partially lived at Spahn's Movie Ranch. During the 1950s and '60s, the Corriganville Movie Ranch and other areas was utilized as movie sets for Western movies. Films and TV-series filmed here includes Gunsmoke, Bonanza, The Lone Ranger, Adventures of Superman, The Adventures of Robin Hood (1938), The Three Musketeers, Tales of the Texas Rangers, Billy the Kid Versus Dracula, Fort Apache, Star Trek, Wagon Train, and hundreds of other mostly Western-inspired movies and TV-shows.

The rural Santa Susana is home to numerous species of native wildlife, including large amounts of snakes, coyotes, hawks and mountain lions.

== Etymology ==
The name "Santa Susana" traces back to the Roman Empire and the Santa Susanna-church built in the 4th century, dedicated to Saint Susanna, a Roman Catholic saint who was martyred and beheaded in Rome in the 3rd century. The name has since then been applied to numerous locations, including a town in the Catalonia region of Spain, as well as the transverse mountain range of Santa Susana in Southern California, after which the town is named. The Santa Susana Knolls of Simi Valley have historically also been written Susanna with double N's. Former names designed to the area have been Green Haven and Mortimer Park.

== History ==
=== Pre-colonial period ===
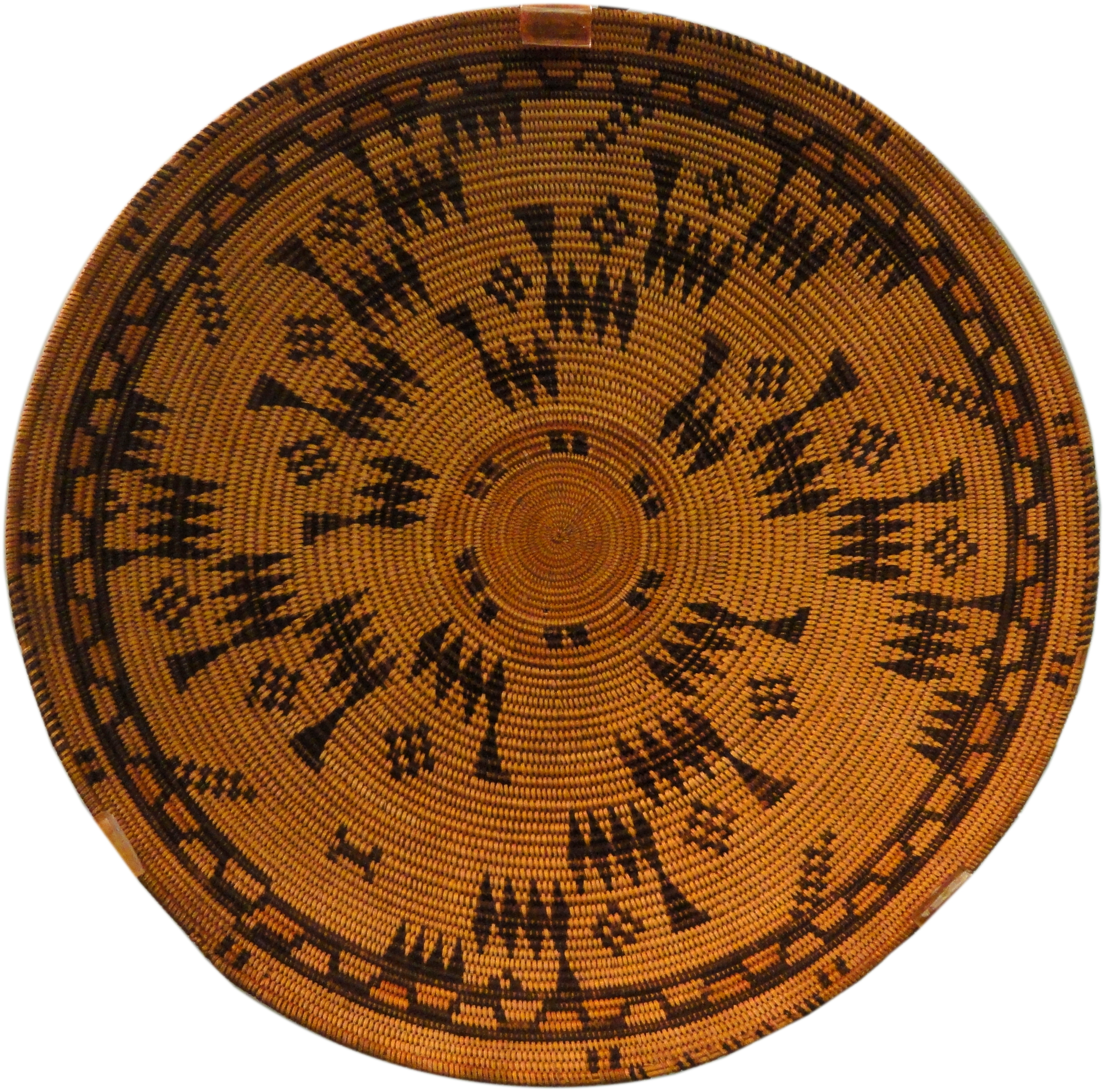
The Chumash here traded baskets with the neighboring Tongva people of today's Los Angeles County.

The hills of and immediate foots of the Santa Susana Mountains have been inhabited for thousands of years, proven by Chumash artifacts found by the Santa Susana Depot and Chumash pictographs dating to 500 AD in the Burro Flats Painted Cave. The area has likely been populated by Native-American peoples for as much as 8,000 years-12,000 years ago The Burro Flats Painted Cave, now situated on the protected private Santa Susana Field Laboratory property, was the setting for a winter solstice ritual for the Ventureño Chumash people. The cave, which is on the back wall of a sandstone shelter about 16 ft long and 4 ft high, was discovered at the turn of the 20th century The Chumash of Santa Susana were unlike other settlements in the Simi Valley not only located near other Ventureño Chumash settlements, but the Chumash here traded with the Tataviam people who also settled in the Santa Susana Mountains, as well as the Gabrielino people who inhabited the opposite side of the Santa Susana Pass.

=== Township period ===
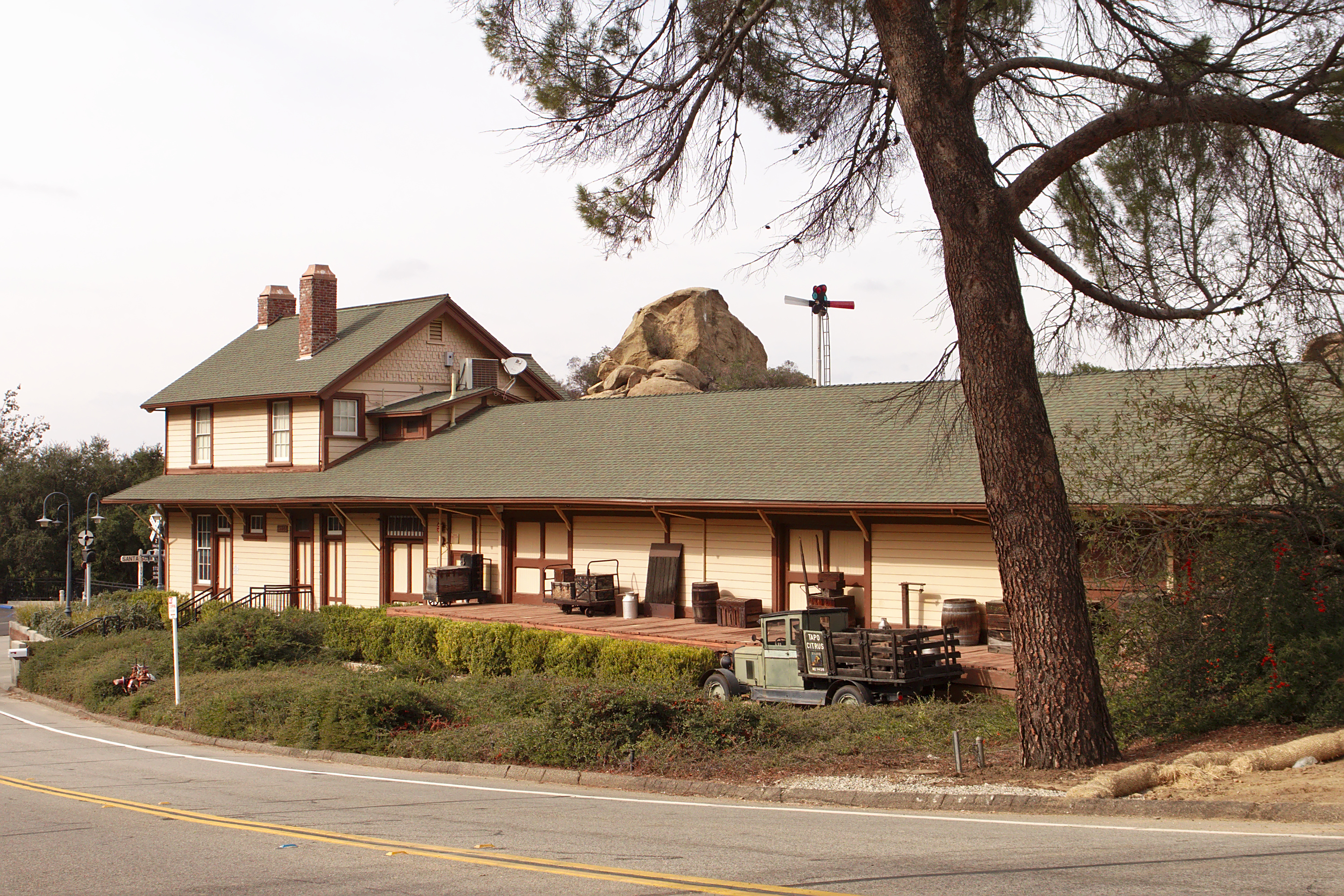
The Santa Susana Depot in 2014.

In 1887, the Simi Valley Land and Water Company first surveyed the area to sell parcels as ranches. With the Santa Susana Depot establishment by the Southern Pacific Company in 1903 as its cornerstone, the town of Santa Susana a few miles east of Simi Valley in the Simi Valley was founded. Before this train station, all residents of the Simi Valley had to travel to San Fernando for the closest railroad station. The first businesses surrounding the new train station was also vital for the town’s establishment, and the discovery of oil on El Rancho Tapo in 1910 brought a population boom to the little town. A general merchandise store on the opposite side of Los Angeles Avenue from the railroad station was the first store established in town, established by Horace Crinklaw and his wife in 1909. In 1914, the town was home to eight buildings: Four owned by the Crinklaw family, a schoolhouse, the Santa Susana Depot, the Southern Pacific Warehouse and a blacksmith shop. Oil production was started by the Scarab Oil Company in 1910 and opened with a production of 300 barrels of oil per day. The little town soon became well known as a filming location for Western movies with its rural and rugged surroundings with plentiful sand rock formations; Western films were filmed here as early as in 1920 on the main street of Santa Susana. By 1918, there were 101 registered voters in Santa Susana.

In 1929, the town was used as a set in the movie Welcome Danger The Santa Susana Airport started as a dirt landing strip in a tomato field in the late 1930s, and later became a paved landing site for hundreds of airplanes in the 1970s. It was officially designed by the FAA in 1944. During all of the 1930s and 1940s, the Corriganville Movie Ranch functioned as a Western movie set for hundreds of Western films and TV series, and later an amusement park for visitors to explore the Western film sets. Films shot here include for instance Jungle Jim, the Jungle Boy TV-series, Lawman, Gunfight at the O.K. Corral, Adventures of Robin Hood, Adventures of Superman, Fort Apache, Rin-Tin-Tin TV-show, and hundreds of others. The ranch became a tourist attraction in 1949 and drew thousands from across America and was rated among the "10 most interesting places in America". The first larger housing developments started in 1958.

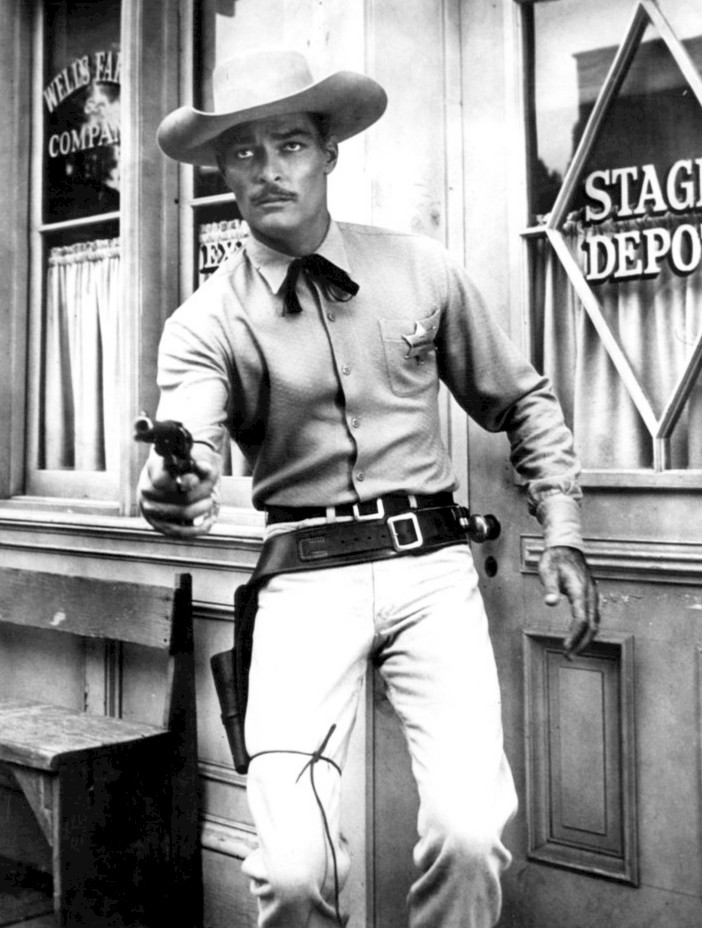
The Lawman TV-series, which was aired in the late 1950s and early 1960s, was partially filmed in Corriganville Movie Ranch.

The area has been home to numerous cults, including the Pisgah Grande (in Las Llajas Canyon, seven miles northeast of town) and May Otis Blackburn's "Divine Order of the Royal Arms of the Great Eleven", sometimes referred to as "the Sixth Cult", high up in the Susana Knolls. In 1949, messiah Krishna Venta's cult "WKFL Foundation of the World" lived in Box Canyon right by the Santa Susana Pass. Krishna was killed in 1958, when former members exploded twenty dynamites in a suicide attack against Krishna and other cult members. It was also here that Charles Manson and the Manson Family partially lived during the late 1960s. The Santa Susana Nuclear Disaster in July 1959 was the worst in American history, and was kept hidden by the United States Atomic Energy Commission for more than twenty years when it was exposed by students from UCLA in the LA Times.

By a 2-1 margin in 1969, voters decided to be incorporated in the City of Simi Valley. On October 10, 1969, the majority of Santa Susana went from being an unincorporated town in the Simi Valley to a part of the city of Simi Valley, which now comprised most of the eponymous valley.

The remaining unincorporated part of Santa Susana is currently mostly known as the Susana Knolls and occupies the hilly, rustic, and rural areas southeast of eastern Simi Valley proper. This area includes the Santa Susana Field Laboratory, a government facility previously used for research and design of rocket engines and nuclear reactors.

== Geography ==
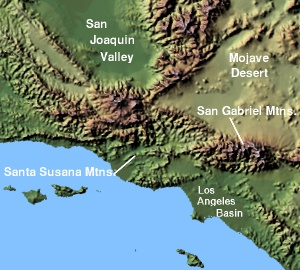
Map of the Santa Susana Mountains.

The CDP is nestled up against the northern slope of the Simi Hills and surrounds the Santa Susana Mountains at an average elevation of 1,165 feet (355 m). It is a hilly and mountainous area, with trees and sand rock formations separating custom-designed homes. It is situated in the easternmost part of Simi Valley in Ventura County. According to the United States Census Bureau, the CDP covers an area of 1.1 square miles (2.9 km^{2}), all land. It is an unincorporated area, sometimes referred to as a neighborhood, community, village or settlement. The northern border of the CDP follows the Metrolink Ventura County Line, across which is the city of Simi Valley. The CDP extends roughly from Rainey Road in the west to Box Canyon Road in the east, and extends south to the limits of development on the lower slopes of the Simi Hills.

There are numerous open-space nature areas near Santa Susana and in the northern Santa Susana Mountains, including Rocky Peak, Santa Susana Pass State Historic Park, Sage Ranch Park, Corriganville Park, Indian Springs Open Space, and other parks and open-space nature areas. Rancho Simi Recreation and Park District administers most parks in Simi Valley’s outlying areas, including in Santa Susana Knolls, Bell Canyon, and Oak Park. The Santa Monica Mountains Conservancy operates certain open-space parks, including Sage Ranch Park, by the Santa Susana Field Laboratory.

== Demographics ==
Historical population
Census	Pop.	Note	%±
2010	1,037		—
2020	1,160		11.9%
U.S. Decennial Census; 1850–1870 1880-1890; 1900 1910 1920; 1930 1940 1950; 1960 1970 1980; 1990 2000 2010

Santa Susana first appeared as a census designated place in the 2010 U.S. census.

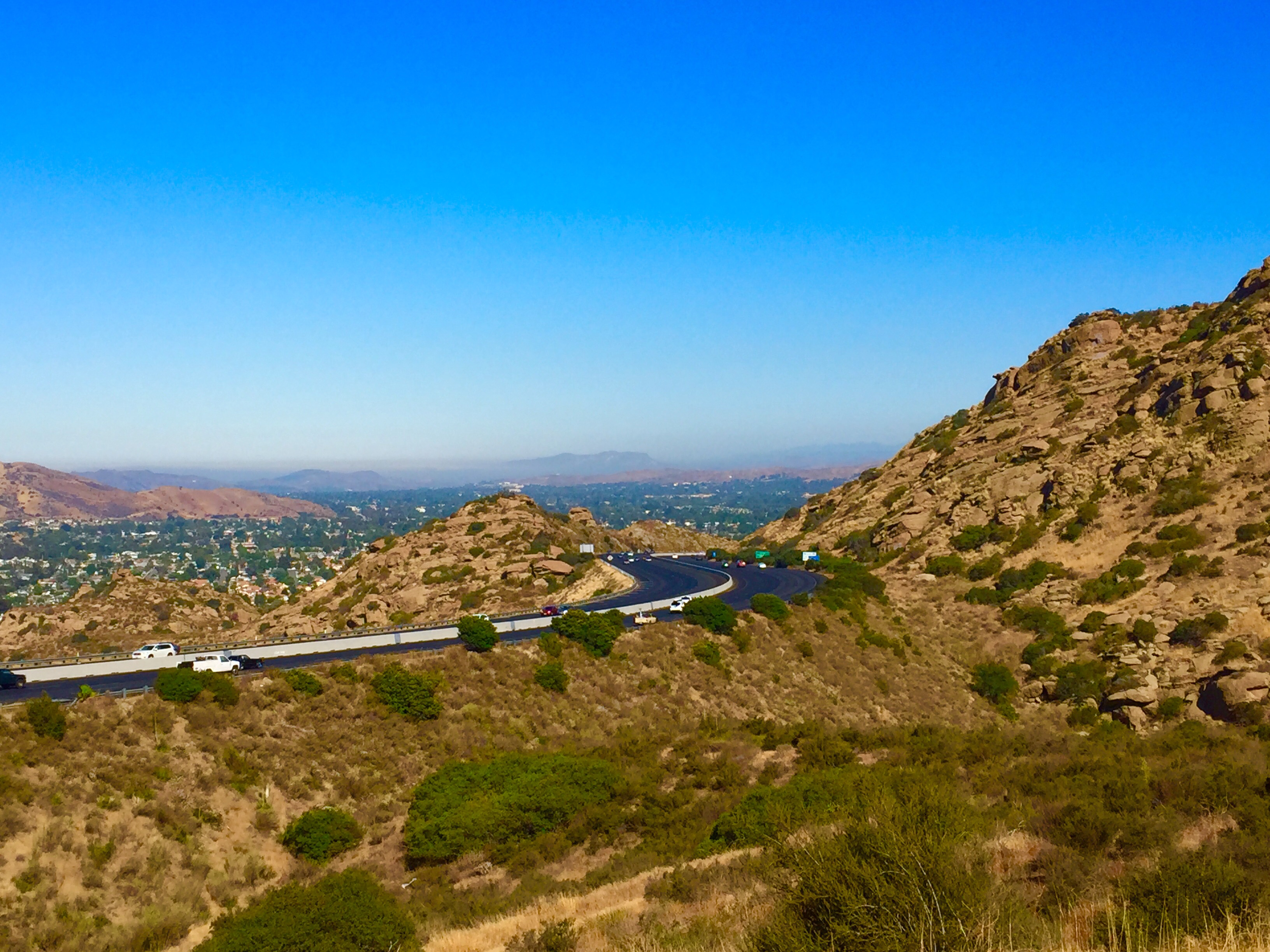
Santa Susana Pass with the Simi Valley and Simi Hills in the far back

=== 2020 census ===
As of the 2020 census, Santa Susana had a population of 1,160. The population density was 924.3 inhabitants per square mile (356.9/km^{2}). The median age was 49.1 years. The age distribution was 213 people (18.4%) under the age of 18, 52 people (4.5%) aged 18 to 24, 249 people (21.5%) aged 25 to 44, 400 people (34.5%) aged 45 to 64, and 246 people (21.2%) who were 65 years of age or older. For every 100 females, there were 100.3 males, and for every 100 females age 18 and over there were 96.5 males age 18 and over.

The whole population lived in households. There were 470 households, out of which 120 (25.5%) had children under the age of 18 living in them. Of all households, 238 (50.6%) were married-couple households, 38 (8.1%) were cohabiting couple households, 111 (23.6%) had a female householder with no spouse or partner present, and 83 (17.7%) had a male householder with no spouse or partner present. 128 households (27.2%) were one person, and 64 (13.6%) were one person aged 65 or older. The average household size was 2.47, and there were 300 families (63.8% of all households).

There were 489 housing units at an average density of 389.6 units per square mile (150.4 units/km^{2}), of which 470 (96.1%) were occupied. Of these, 346 (73.6%) were owner-occupied and 124 (26.4%) were occupied by renters. Of all housing units, 3.9% were vacant. The homeowner vacancy rate was 0.6% and the rental vacancy rate was 4.6%. 95.1% of residents lived in urban areas, while 4.9% lived in rural areas.

Racial composition as of the 2020 census
Race	Number	Percent
White	846	72.9%
Black or African American	20	1.7%
American Indian and Alaska Native	3	0.3%
Asian	51	4.4%
Native Hawaiian and Other Pacific Islander	2	0.2%
Some other race	69	5.9%
Two or more races	169	14.6%
Hispanic or Latino (of any race)	193	16.6%

== Landmarks ==
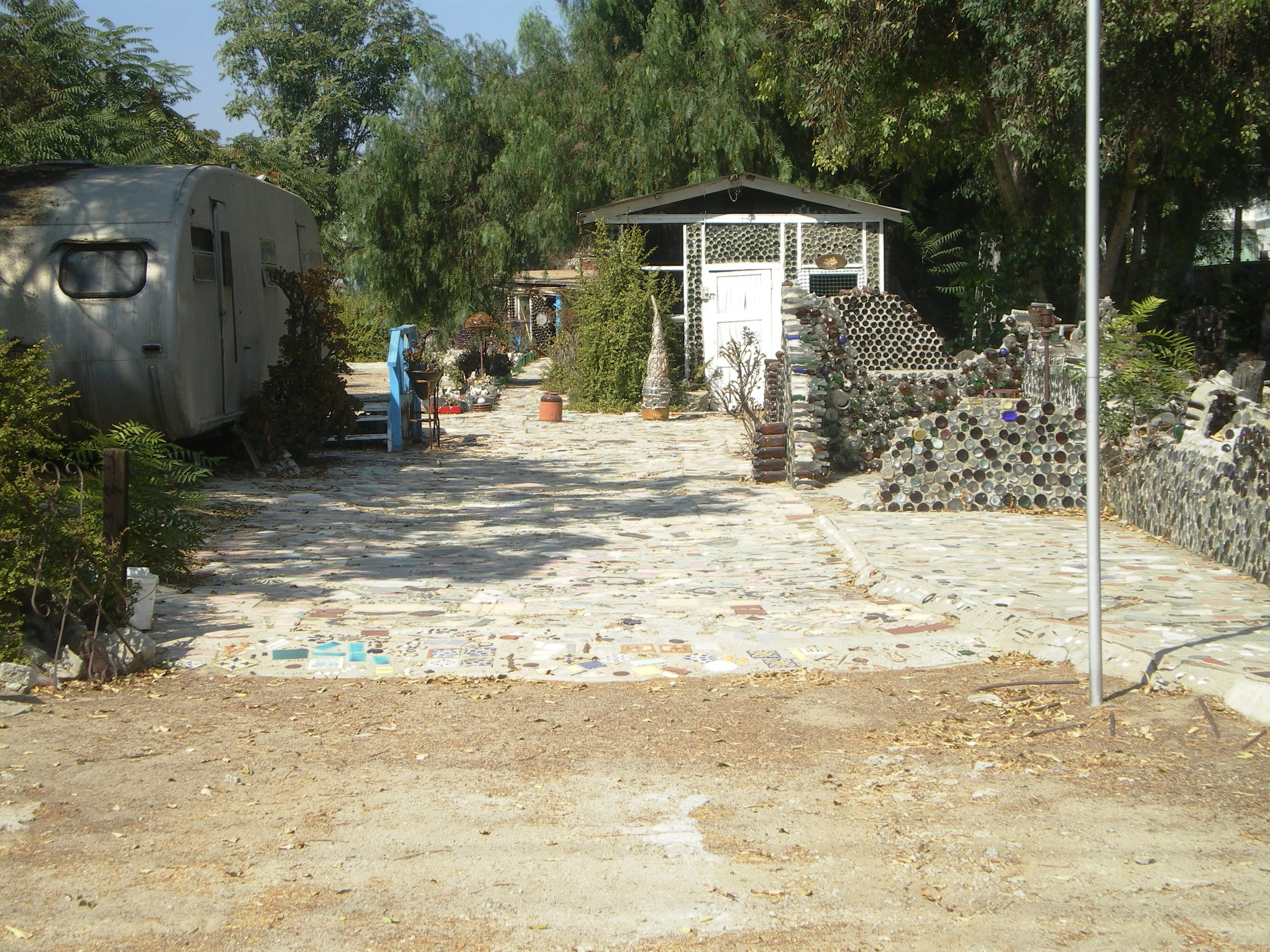
Grandma Prisbrey's Bottle Village is a California Historical Landmark, U.S. Historic district, and on the U.S. National Register of Historic Places.

- Grandma Prisbrey's Bottle Village (California State Historic Landmark on the National Register of Historic Places, as well as a Ventura County Cultural Landmark)
- Old Santa Susana Stage Road (on the U.S. National Register of Historic Places and a Los Angeles Historic-Cultural Monument)
- Santa Susana Depot (County of Ventura designated Landmark #29)
- Corriganville Movie Ranch (regional park)
- Santa Susana Pass State Historic Park (California State Park)
- Rocky Peak

== Education ==
The CDP is located in the Simi Valley Unified School District.

== Wildlife ==
The community of Santa Susana is adjacent to the Santa Susana Pass wildlife corridor, which connects the Simi Hills (and the Santa Monica Mountains) to the Santa Susana Mountains and further wilderness areas such as the Tehachapi Mountains and San Gabriel Mountains. It is home to an abundance of wildlife, including larger mammals such as numerous cougars, coyotes, bobcats, grey foxes and more common species such as the Virginia opossum, California raccoon, ring-tailed cat, California vole, desert cottontail, Botta's pocket gopher as well as the spotted- and striped skunk. Large undeveloped areas provide natural habitat to numerous species, and saves the wildlife of the Santa Monica Mountains from genetic isolation. As in the rest of the Simi Valley, large areas are assigned parks or open space preserves and are protected wildlife habitats. The dry semi-arid climate of Santa Susana also provides a habitat for numerous species adopted to arid climates and temperature extremes. It is home to numerous reptiles, including eleven species of snake: coachwhip, southern Pacific rattlesnake, San Diego night snake, striped racer, California black-headed snake, two-striped garter snake, San Diego gopher snake, coast mountain kingsnake, California kingsnake, coast patch-nosed snake and ringneck snake. Lizards found here are also plentiful, including the San Diego horned lizard, California horned lizard, San Diego alligator lizard, western fence lizard, California side blotched lizard, western skink, western whiptail, and silvery legless lizard. Birds in the area are mostly raptors, including the California vulture, turkey vulture, white-tailed kite, American kestrel, Cooper's hawk, sharp-shinned hawk, marsh hawk, red-tailed hawk, red-shouldered hawk, and the common nighthawk. Owl species include the great horned owl, short-eared owl, long-eared owl, barn owl, and the burrowing owl. There are also peacocks and numerous other species of wildlife found in the eastern Simi Valley. Scorpions are also common.

== See also ==
- Santa Susana Tunnel
