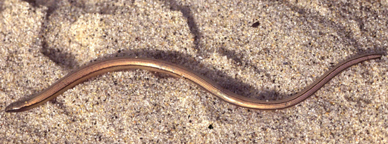

Conservation status
- Vulnerable (IUCN 3.1)

Scientific classification
- Kingdom: Animalia
- Phylum: Chordata
- Class: Reptilia
- Order: Squamata
- Suborder: Anguimorpha
- Family: Anniellidae
- Genus: Anniella
- Species: A. pulchra

Binomial name
- Anniella pulchra (Gray, 1852)
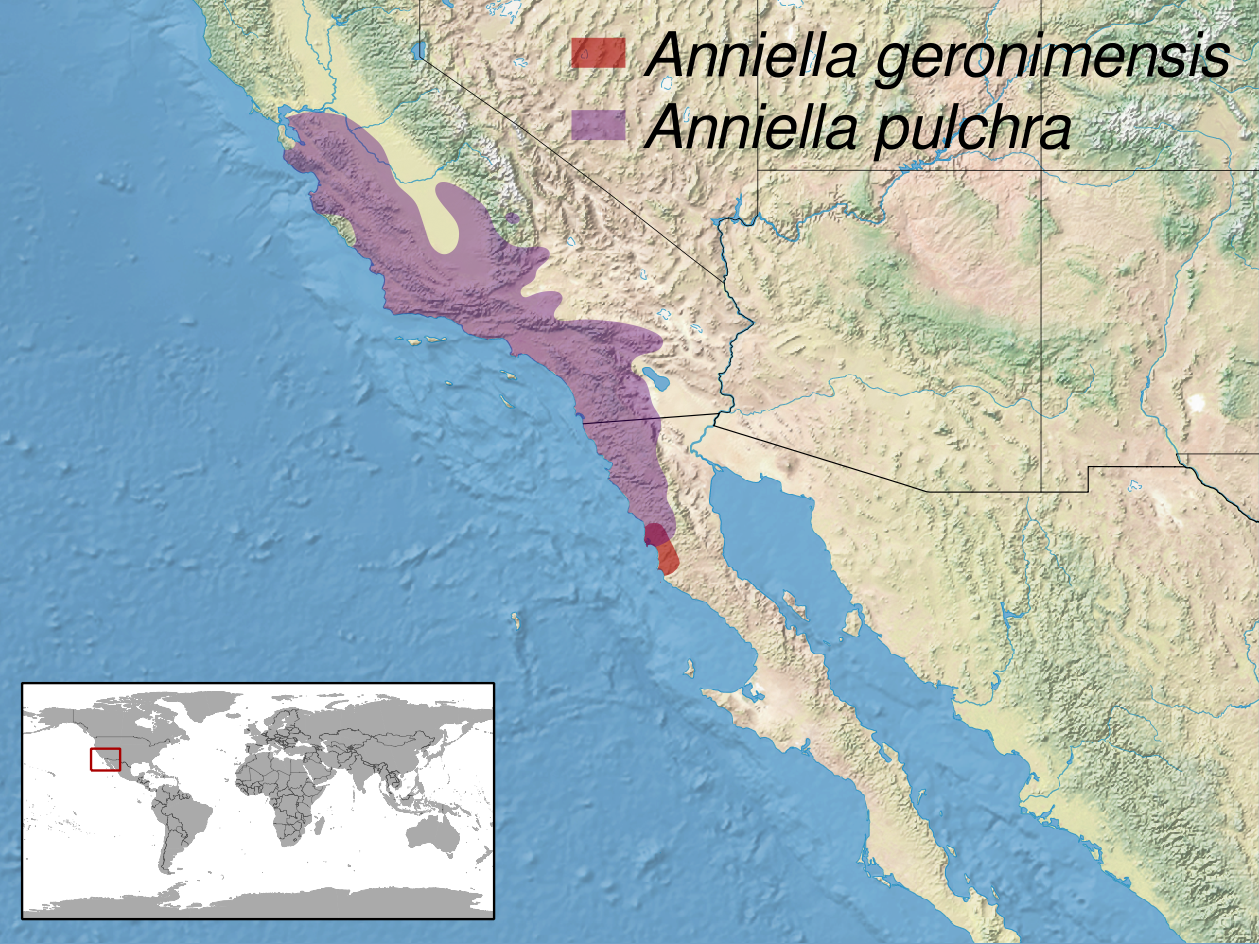
- Range of Anniella pulchra (sensu lato) in purple

= Anniella pulchra =

California legless lizard

Species of lizard

Anniella pulchra, the California legless lizard, is a limbless, burrowing lizard often mistaken for a snake.

== Description ==
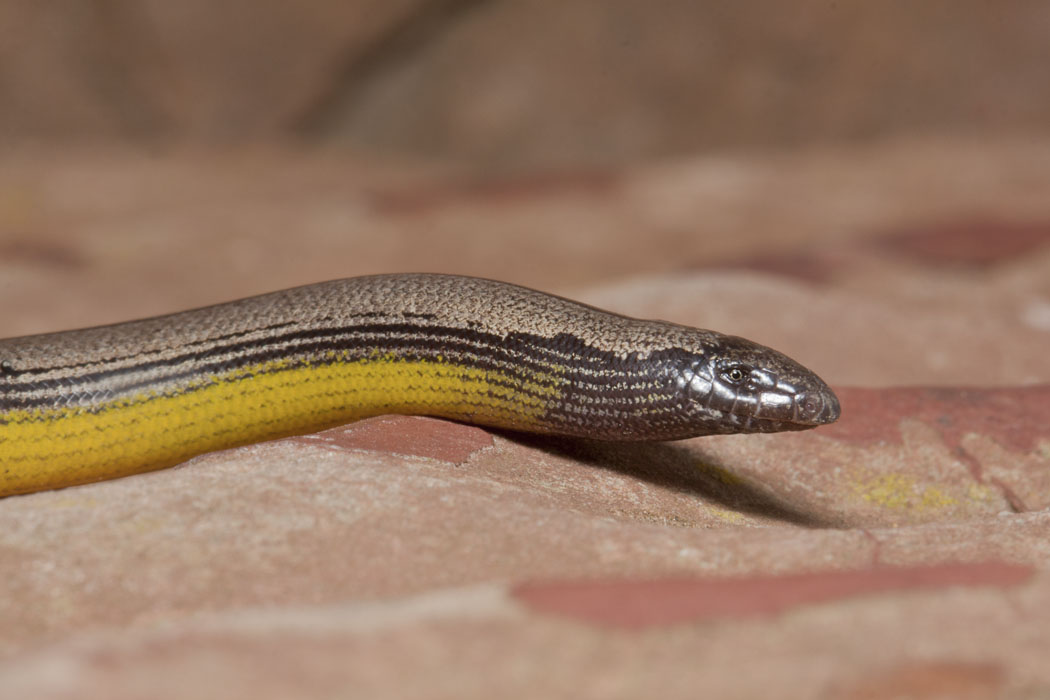
Anniella pulchra, Los Osos, CA

Anniella pulchra measures around 7 inches (18 cm) from snout to vent (excluding the tail). The slightly pointed head and eyes are both rather small—adaptations for a primarily fossorial (burrowing) lifestyle. Colors are usually a silver-bronze dorsal (back) side and a yellow underside, separated by black side-stripes or markings extending from the lizard's head down the length of its body. Black (melanistic) and darker brown forms, which were thought to be a separate subspecies at one point, have been observed in Monterey County, California.

== Taxonomy ==
There were formerly two subspecies of California legless lizard recognized based on individual color morphs: the silvery legless lizard, A. p. pulchra, and the black legless lizard, A. p. nigra. However, contemporary taxonomy considers them simply a melanistic morph. More recently (in 2013), A. pulchra has been split up into five different species: A. pulchra (with a narrower definition), A. alexanderae, A. campi, A. grinnelli, and A. stebbinsi.

Traits of the New Species:

- Anniella alexanderae (Temblor Legless Lizard): Gray underside with 1 lateral stripe; slightly more vertebrae (~82) and over 250 dorsal scales.
- Anniella campi (Southern Sierra Legless Lizard): Yellow underside with two dark stripes running down each side.
- Anniella grinnelli (Bakersfield Legless Lizard): Grayish-red underside that looks purple when alive; ~ 81 vertebrae.
- Anniella stebbinsi (Southern California Legless Lizard): Yellow underside, has 20 chromosomes instead of 22 like A. pulchra.

== Basis of the split : A Phylogenetic and Taxonomic Approach ==
Researchers used a combination of evidence to separate Anniella pulchra into distinct species. Differences in coloration, scale patterns, trunk vertebra number, and chromosome counts all supported the revision. When scientists compared a specific piece of DNA (the ND2 gene) from different Anniella groups, they found that their genetic code was about 4% to 9% different from each other. Differences that large show they’re separate species rather than just local variations. These levels are consistent with species-level distinctions in other lizards. This discovery adds to what we know about the genus’s past. Anniella comes from an ancient family of lizards that first appeared millions of years ago during the Eocene. Today, it’s the only surviving member of that group, with fossils found only in California and Baja California.

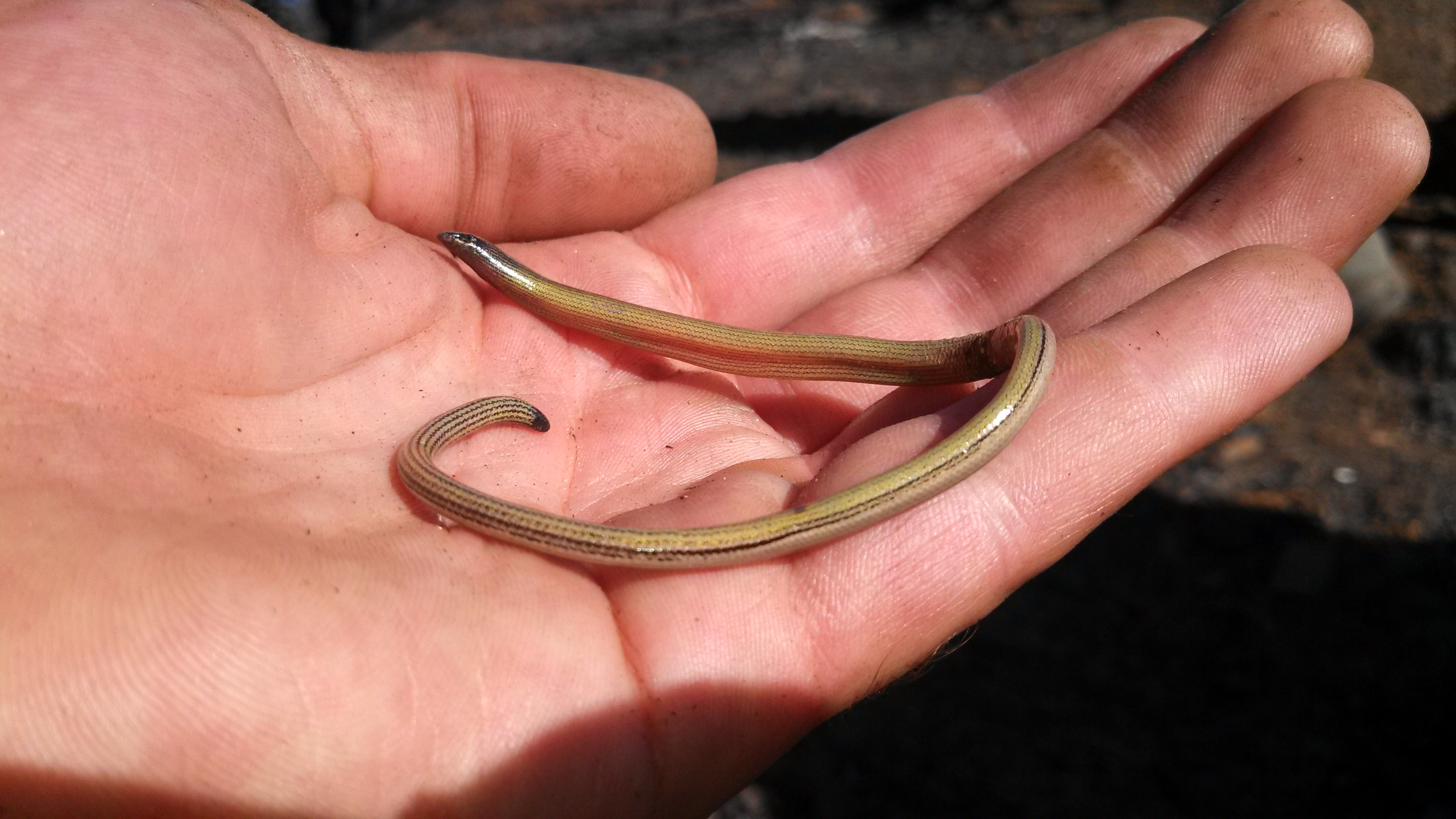
Size approximation of 7 inches

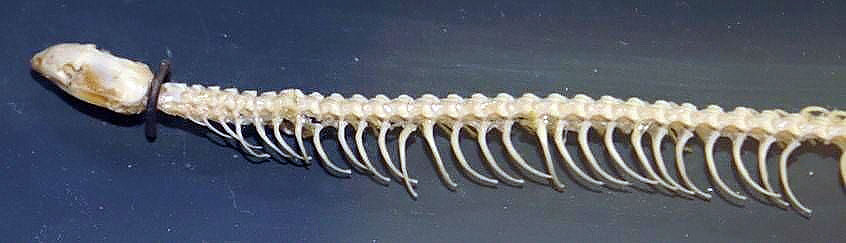
Vertebrae of the legless lizard

The reduction or loss of limbs is a recurring theme for reptiles like Anniella pulchra. In 1995, Fong, Kane, and Culver inferred that Darwin's theory on evolution heavily influenced the lack of limbs as a result of weak selection. The elongation in the body of the reptile preceded the legless feature.

== Distribution and habitat ==
A. pulchra live in loose, sandy soils or leaf litter, or among sand dunes and dry washes beneath rocks along the Pacific coast. They are found from Contra Costa County in Northern California, south to Baja California, although its population distribution is often scattered. They require some source of moisture to aid in the regular shedding of their skin; without shedding properly, the lizard's ability to eat and see can be affected, potentially starving the animal.

A. pulchra populations are typically concentrated in coastal regions, often inhabiting coastal dunes with native vegetation such as bush lupine (Lupinus arboreus) and mock heather (Eriogonum parvilifolium). These shrubs help retain soil moisture, provide shelter from heat while simultaneously attracting insect prey. Though it's important to note that the species complex occupies elevations from near sea level to about 2000 m, a little lower than what was thought in older reports that grouped more species under A. pulchra, showing a clearer picture of its actual range after recent classification updates.

These lizards can be found in diverse vegetation zones, ranging from seaside dunes to inland open pine woodlands. In the Sierra Nevada, the species has been spotted at elevations of up to 2050 meters (6,725'), and 1360 meters (4,461') in Sierra de Juárez and Sierra de San Pedro Mártir.

The University of California Publications in Zoology has records of spottings for both the silvery legless lizard and the black legless lizard. The silvery legless lizard has been spotted specifically North of Contra Costa County, San Ardo Monterey County, east to Bear Valley, San Benito County, Sequoia National Park, Tular County, etc, all the way to La Puerta Valley and other parts of East San Diego. Furthermore, the Black legless lizard has been spotted in San Francisco, Pacific Grove, Marin County and more. Both species can be found in several parts of California.

== Diet ==
Their diet consists of mainly beetles, larval insects, termites, ants, and spiders. To obtain food, they camouflage themselves under leaves and ambush their prey. It is an insectivorous species that burrows before eating the prey. Through the stomach content analyses, its diets also include adult beetles and spiders. A. pulchra rarely hunt on the surface due to their fossorial lifestyle. It feeds on soft-bodied invertebrates within the soils and leaf litter. It captures prey during cool and moist periods when the invertebrates are active, often during the night. It helps regulate the insect population and the ground’s nutrient cycling.

== Reproduction ==
Males are slightly smaller than females, otherwise there is no discernible difference between the two sexes. Females are ovoviviparous and probably breed between early spring and July, with 1 to 4 young born September–November. Young lizards resemble their parents except look like smaller versions of them. At birth, they are usually 8 - 10 cm in total length. They have the same silver-tan color which becomes dark as they grow. The males are relatively smaller than females, and they lack obvious sexual differentiation. Around 2 to 3 years old after maturity without parental care after birth, their reproductive modes are evolved through adapting to subterranean lifestyles. The stable and safe thermal sandy soils underground benefit the embryonic development.

== Defense ==
These lizards when provoked can use their tails as a dummy to distract a predator. When threatened, its tail detaches and acts like the lizard, giving it a chance to escape from its predator. The lizard will detach its tail voluntarily, and wriggle vigorously for a few seconds to distract the predators. In this case, they could retreat into the soil or leaf litter. Their tail loss is common especially in wild populations, and more than half of them have regenerated tails. The regeneration requires a year, and the new tail is shorter and darker. Even if the autotomy is effective, it costs them a lot of energy. Therefore, the tail stores fat to support metabolism during low prey availability.

== Temperature selectivity ==
A study conducted by R. Bruce Bury and Thomas G. Balgooyen in 1976 revealed the "temperature selectivity" of Anniella pulchra. Based on the results of this study, the mean temperature these lizards preferred was 24-25 C. This temperature depended on the level of moisture in the environment and is said to help them remain its increased activity in its environments where it is often cooler.

The researchers compare the temperature preference of these lizards to be similar to the alligator lizard, the Gerrhonotus multi-carinatus, as both lizards are noted to be active at lower temperatures more so than other diurnal species, while also avoiding temperatures over 30 C.

== Genetic diversity ==
A study by Parham and Papenfuss in 2008 revealed a higher level of genetic diversity than previously reported. Using mitochondrial and nuclear DNA sequences from museum-volunteered samples, their research identified five major genetic lineages of the Anniella pulchra. Two of these lineages align with a north-south split observed in other widespread Californian reptiles. Notably, unlike many other Californian reptiles, Anniella pulchra has genetic lineages endemic to Central California, with two being exclusive to the San Joaquin Valley and Carrizo Plain.

Their research has also revealed that due to urban development, only one of the three localities of the Anniella pulchra located in the Bakersfield region remains alive today.

== Water intake and adaption ==
The Anniella pulchra exhibits a unique method of water intake. According to a paper from Margaret Fusari, these lizards can increase their mass by absorbing water, only when their mouth is in direct contact with moist sand. The efficiency of their water absorption is directly related to the moisture content of the sand, suggesting that there are natural limits to their hydration based on the sand's properties. This adaptation is why these lizards can thrive in environments where water is scarce and limited. This is a process that does not happen in dry substrates, indicating that their mucosal water uptake is along their oral membranes. The absorption rate depends on the sand's moisture. In this case, these lizards have ecological limits to arid coastal dunes as well as inland chaparral regions.

== Head musculature ==
The m. cervicomandibularis in Anniella is notably developed, and the depressor mandibulae has both a substantial extrinsic and a weaker intrinsic component. The structure of the m. pterygoideus in Anniella is typical of lizards, but with specific distinctions. The genioglossus muscle in Anniella consists of a prominent medialis portion and a smaller lateralis section. The cranial musculature of Anniella pulchra indicates a fossorial lifestyle, which are several adaptations. The depressor mandibulae have a strong and a weak component, which reflect their mechanism of opening mouth during locomotion. The genioglossus is for tongue projection as it has two sections, one is large medialis and the other is small lateralis. The control of tongue moves are inside the tunnels. Overall, A. pulchra’s skull and musculature are designed for efficient feeding in subterean and locomotion.

== Formerly Recognized Subspecies ==
According to californiaherps.com, this lizard was previously split into two distinct species, the Anniella pulchra pulchra, the Silver Legless Lizard, and the Anniella pulchra nigra, the Black Legless Lizard. This distinction is no longer recognized due to a study that demonstrated that these populations have different ancestors, separating them into their own groups.
