= Grandma Prisbrey's Bottle Village =

Art environment in Simi Valley, California, United States

- U.S. National Register of Historic Places
- U.S. Historic district
- California Historical Landmark
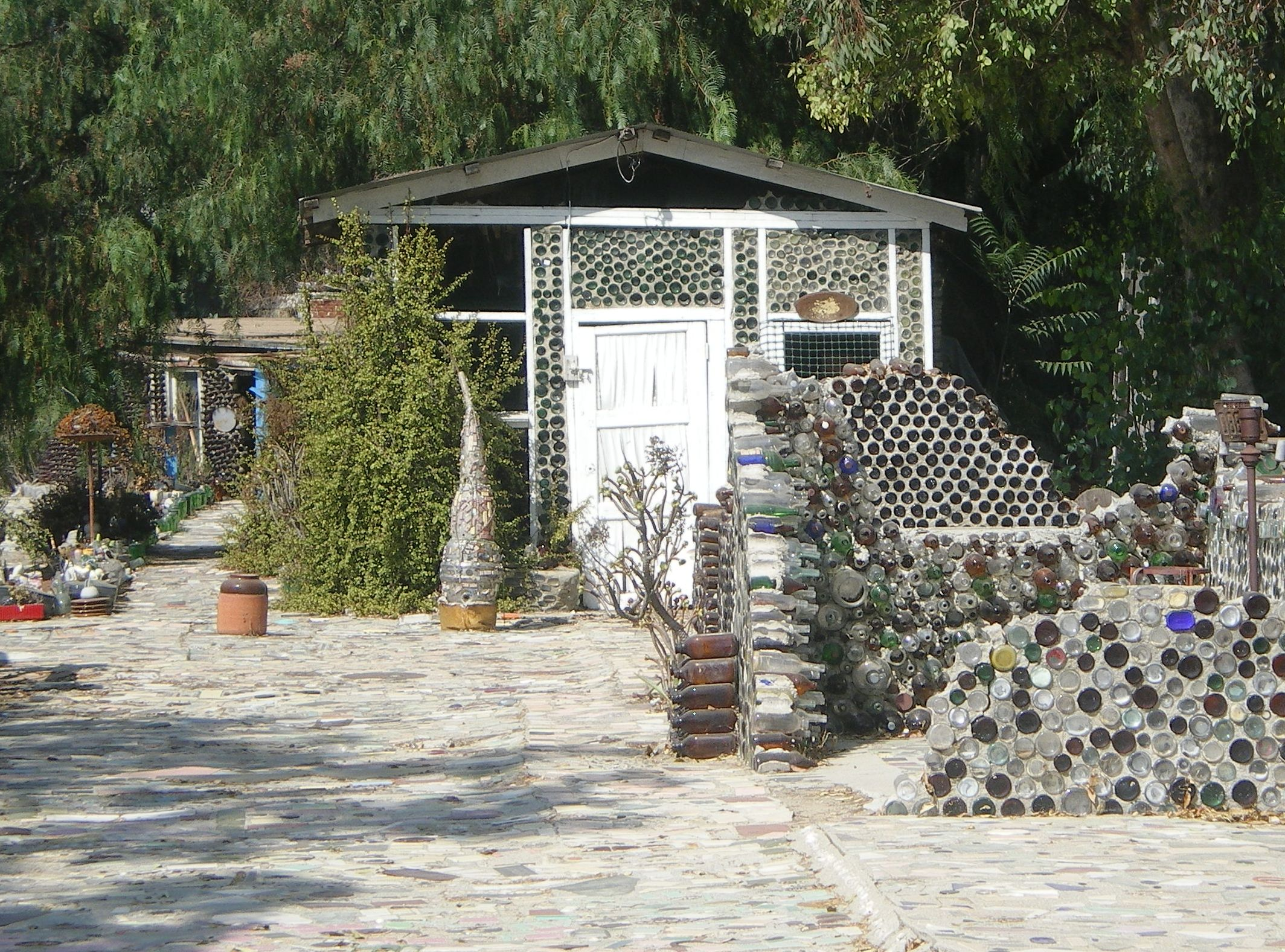
- Grandma Prisbrey's Bottle Village, September 2008

- Location within California Location within the United States
- Location: 4595 Cochran St; Simi Valley, California
- Coordinates: 34°16′45.24″N 118°42′16.75″W
- Architect: Tressa "Grandma" Prisbrey
- NRHP reference No.: 96001076
- CHISL No.: 939
- Added to NRHP: October 25, 1996

Grandma Prisbrey's Bottle Village, also known as Bottle Village, is an art environment, located in Simi Valley, California. It was created by Tressa "Grandma" Prisbrey (1896–1988) from the 1950s to the 1970s. Prisbey built a "village" of shrines, walkways, sculptures, and buildings from recycled items and discards from the local landfill.

Bottle Village has been designated as a historical landmark by the City of Simi Valley, County of Ventura, and State of California (California Historical Landmark No. 939. It was also listed on the National Register of Historic Places in 1996.

Bottle Village closed in 1984 and was severely damaged during the 1994 Northridge earthquake.

== Tressa "Grandma" Prisbrey ==
Tressa Luella Schaefer was born in Easton, Minnesota in 1896. She attended school until the age of twelve and studied mostly politics in North Dakota. At the age of 15, Prisbrey married the ex-husband of her sister, Theodore Grinolds who was 37 years her senior (52 years old). The marriage with Theodore only lasted 14 years and within those years she bore seven children. After Theodore's passing at age 72, Prisbrey and her seven children moved up to Seattle where she married an unnamed and unemployed man. Their marriage was very short lived. Over the course of her life, she had witnessed the passing of six out of her seven children (4 boys, 2 girls).

In 1946, Prisbrey made the move to Santa Susana, now a neighborhood in Simi Valley, California. Ten years after the move, Prisbrey met her husband Al Prisbrey, who bought one-third of an acre located on Cochran Street. They brought in a trailer to live in, removed the tires, and hid them in an effort to stay grounded on the lot. When Prisbrey first moved to Santa Susana, she had a large collection of 17,000 pencils which had previously been her hobby. In an effort to find a place to put them, she decided she wanted to make a house for her pencils to stay. At the age of 60, she began looking around to buy cinder-blocks to build with but came to discover the prices were way out of her range. They had spent all their money paying for the property so she resorted to visiting a local dump where she found thousands of colored bottles. She began going to her sister Hattie's house and made cement by hand and built her first bottle house. Prisbrey mentioned she did not begin this project to gain attention but as an outpost as well as a place to keep all of her things. She was interested in the fact that everything has a purpose and is special and unique and that is exactly what she brings to bottle village. Not just in the visuals but the overall feeling you receive from being present.

The Village was very much established by 1961 but Prisbrey kept adding structures and tweaking into the 1980s. She moved away in 1972, but later came back to live in a trailer alongside the village where she continued adding sculptures and flower planters.

In 1982 Prisbrey, in poor health, left Simi Valley to live with her daughter and son-in-law in San Francisco. In July 1986 the property was gift deeded to a nonprofit group, Preserve Bottle Village. In October 1988, Prisbrey died from complications of a stroke at a convalescent hospital in San Francisco.

== Bottle Village ==
After starting with a wall, Prisbrey continued to build until she had constructed 16 buildings and structures made of glass and assorted other materials, a mosaic sidewalk, the Leaning Tower of Bottle Village, the Dolls Head Shrine, Cleopatra's Bedroom, the Round House, and more. The Los Angeles Times described Bottle Village as an "eccentric folk-art wonderland."

Apart from entertaining visitors, Bottle Village is a folk art environment that houses Prisbrey's personal collections and memorializes her family, friends and personal life. It reflects the artist's grief over lost family members and remains a testament to the artist's vision, exuberance, and inspirations. It is composed of disposable consumer items from the everyday lives of Americans in the late 1950s and early 1960s.

When building Bottle Village, no help was given and everything is made from hand and all recycled materials. One of the shrines is called The Headlight Garden. This garden was made for her then 35-year-old daughter who had been diagnosed with cancer. Her daughter loved flowers so Prisbrey decided to make her a rose garden made out of headlights and recycled materials. Before her daughter's passing, she would love to wake up every morning and sit by the garden in silence. According to Prisbrey, the day her daughter died, the roses died.

There are heart, diamond, and spade stepping stones that symbolize when Prisbrey visited Las Vegas, Nevada. She made the forms out of cement but then filled them with random recycled things like scissors. Bottle Village also has wishing wells made from tiles, ground is paved with recyclables, a doll shrine, and a leaning tower of bottles. Each building has its own theme. A doll house was built to house Prisbrey's collection of 600 dolls. Prisbrey mentioned every day she would go into that house and dress up some of the dolls.

"Anyone can do something with a million dollars. Look at Disney," Prisbrey once said. "But it takes more than money to make something out of nothing, and look at the fun I have doing it." When visitors would come to Bottle Village when Prisbrey was still alive, she would first take them on a tour but then end in her meditation room where she would allow them to meditate as well as listen to her sing different songs. She would charge only 75 cents a visit but people would frequently give her more.

== Earthquake and funding ==
The 1994 Northridge earthquake struck eight miles away and badly damaged the Village. Because of the severe damage, Preserve Bottle Village applied for Federal Emergency Management Agency (FEMA) funding. In 1997, when it appeared FEMA would award a $455,000 grant to help repair the earthquake damage to the Village, the grant was lost after former Councilwoman Sandi Webb and U.S. Rep. Elton Gallegly, R-Simi Valley, opposed it. Gallegly called it a waste of taxpayers' money. Also, James Lee Witt, the director of the Federal Emergency Management Agency, said his organization had determined that the site was not eligible for Federal disaster relief money because it had not been open to the general public since 1984. The Simi Valley Historical Society and Rancho Simi Recreation and Park District allocated about $150,000 to restore an apricot pitting shed. The City of Simi Valley also contributed at least $24,000 through Community Development Block Grant funds to restore the 1920s woodshed with concrete pillars, a remnant of the area's apricot industry.

Since the earthquake, Bottle Village has been in need of support and funding. The late artist Joanne Johnson, who was one of the docents and served for some time on the board of directors (including a stint as board president), wrote that the “crumbling Bottle Village is an ironic paradox – built from castoffs, now cast aside. This piece of Folk Art is the definition of the saying 'one man's treasure is another man's junk'." Because of the disrepair in which the site is currently, there is little activity. Very few people are still available to give scheduled tours of the Village so personal tours can be difficult to book, but monthly private tours are available at www.bottlevillage.com.

Preserve Bottle Village continues preservation efforts, speaking with private foundations. It has received a few generous grants, from the Larry Janss – School of the Pacific Islands Foundation ($21,000), the Rothschild Foundation ($15,000), and the Gareth Evans - Golden Rule Foundation ($10,000 + $5,000).

== In popular culture ==
The Doll Head Shrine has created a cult following and was reproduced on the cover of Wall of Voodoo’s chart-topping single "Mexican Radio" in 1982.

The Village inspired a 32-page children's book, Bottle Houses: The Creative World of Grandma Prisbrey by Melissa Eskridge Slaymaker.

Tressa Prisbrey is commemorated every year during Halloween at Simi Valley's Strathearn Historical Park Ghost Tour, which tells the history of Simi Valley.

== Exhibitions ==
1974–1976 "Naives and Visionaries", sponsored by the National Endowment for the Arts and the Walker Art Center, Minneapolis, MN

1975 "America Now", sponsored by the U.S. Information Agency (traveling European exhibition)

1976 "Grandma Prisbrey", Woman's Building, Los Angeles, CA (solo exhibition)

1977 "In Celebration of Ourselves", Museum of Modern Art, San Francisco, CA

1979–1981 "A Look at the Art of the 70's", sponsored by the International Communication Agency (traveling exhibition)

1984 "Visions of Paradise", Beyond Baroque, Venice, CA "Bits and Pieces: The Dream-builders of California", Chevron Art Gallery, San Francisco, CA

1985 "Divine Disorder: Folk Art Environments of California", Triton Museum of Art, Santa Clara, CA (traveling exhibition)

1985–1986 "A Time to Reap", Co-sponsored by Seton Hall Univ. NJ, & the Museum of American Folk Art, NY (traveling exhibition)

1986 "Cat and a Ball on a Waterfall: 200 Years of California Painting and Sculpture", Oakland Museum, Oakland, CA

1988 "Not so Naive: Bay Area Artists and Outsider Art", San Francisco Craft & Folk Art Museum, San Francisco, CA

1989 "Forty Years of California Assemblage", UCLA Whyte Gallery, Los Angeles, CA (traveling exhibition) "Women in American Architecture", Pacific Design Center, Los Angeles, CA (traveling exhibition)

1990 "Ageless", the Woman's Building, Los Angeles, CA

1992 "Reflections of Bottle Village", Simi Valley Cultural Center, Simi Valley, CA

1995 "Visions from the Left Coast" Santa Barbara Contemporary Arts Forum, Santa Barbara, CA

1996–1999 "Recycled-Reseen" Santa Fe Museum of Art, Santa Fe, New Mexico (traveling)

2000 Outsider Art window display, Hennessy + Ingalls, Santa Monica, CA

== Gallery of images ==
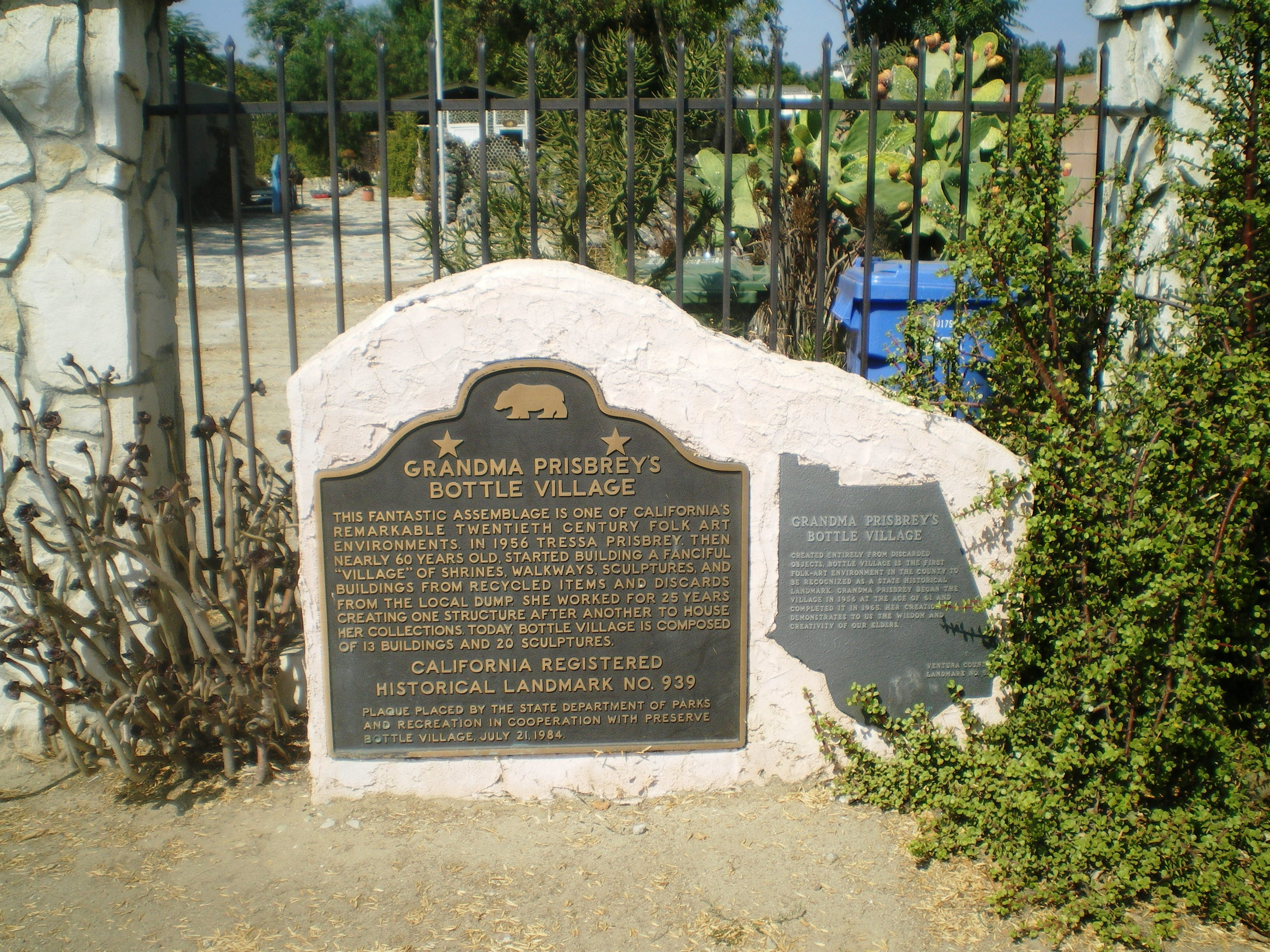
Historical plaques at entrance

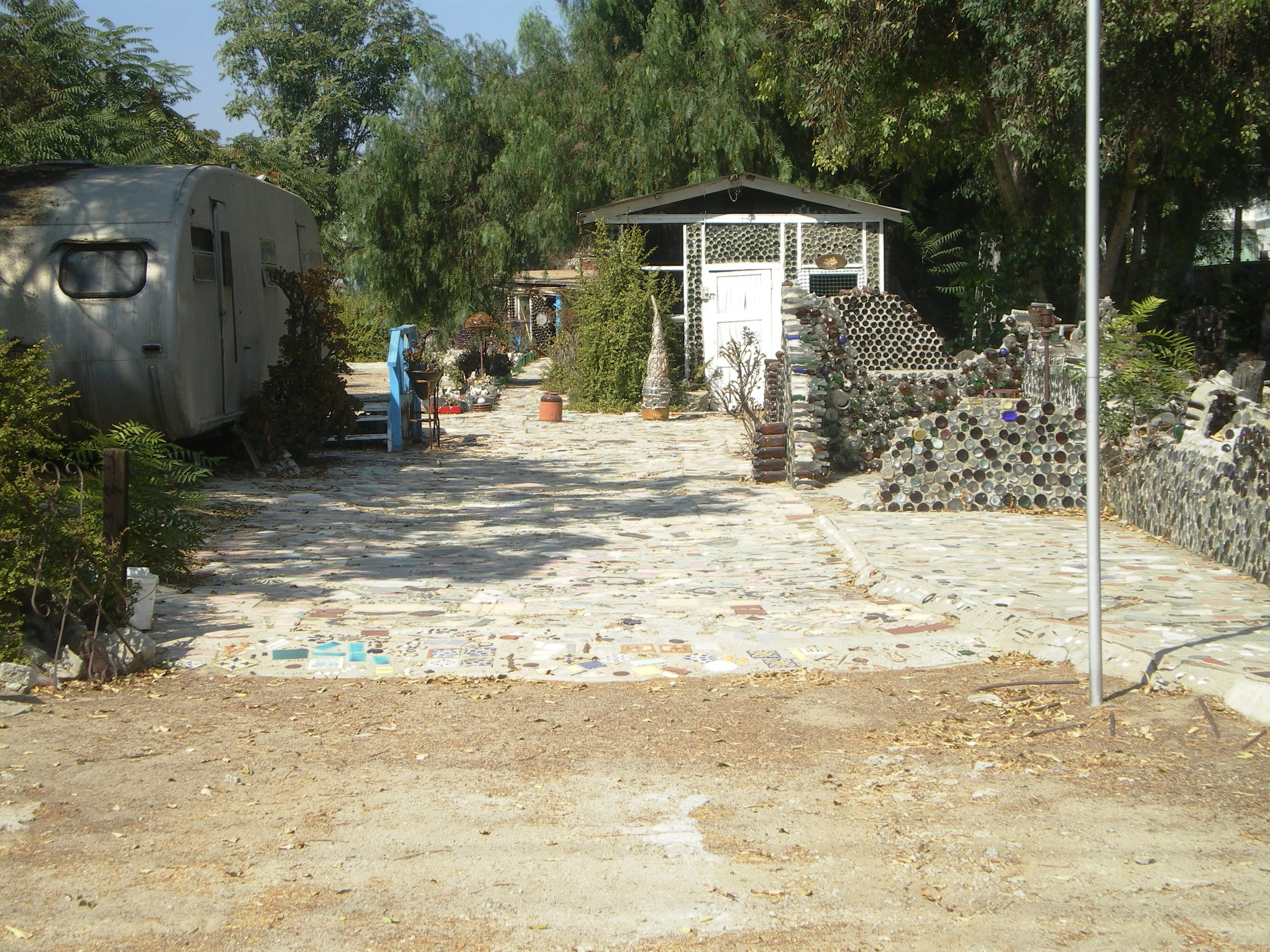
Bottle Village overview

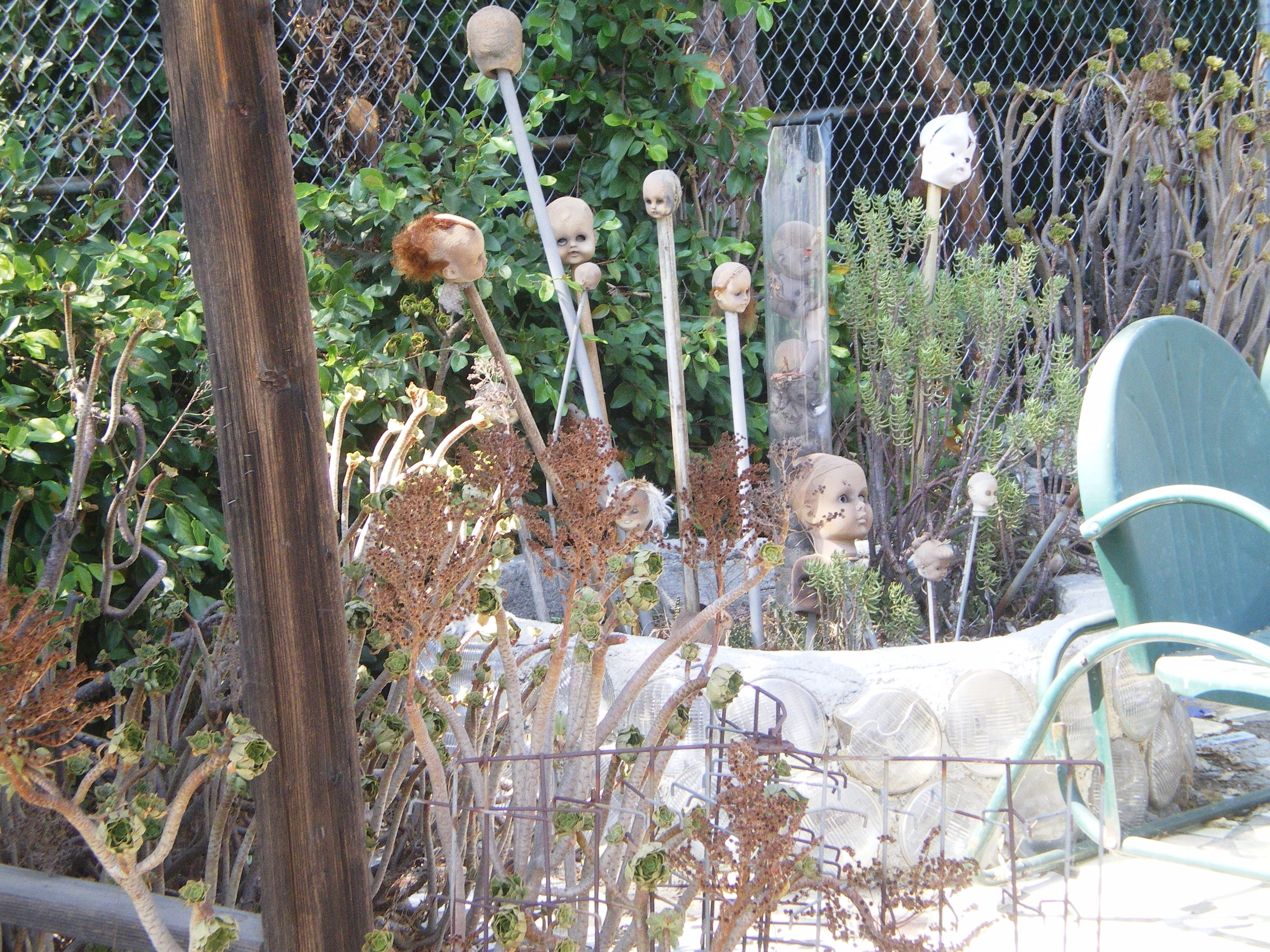
Doll heads

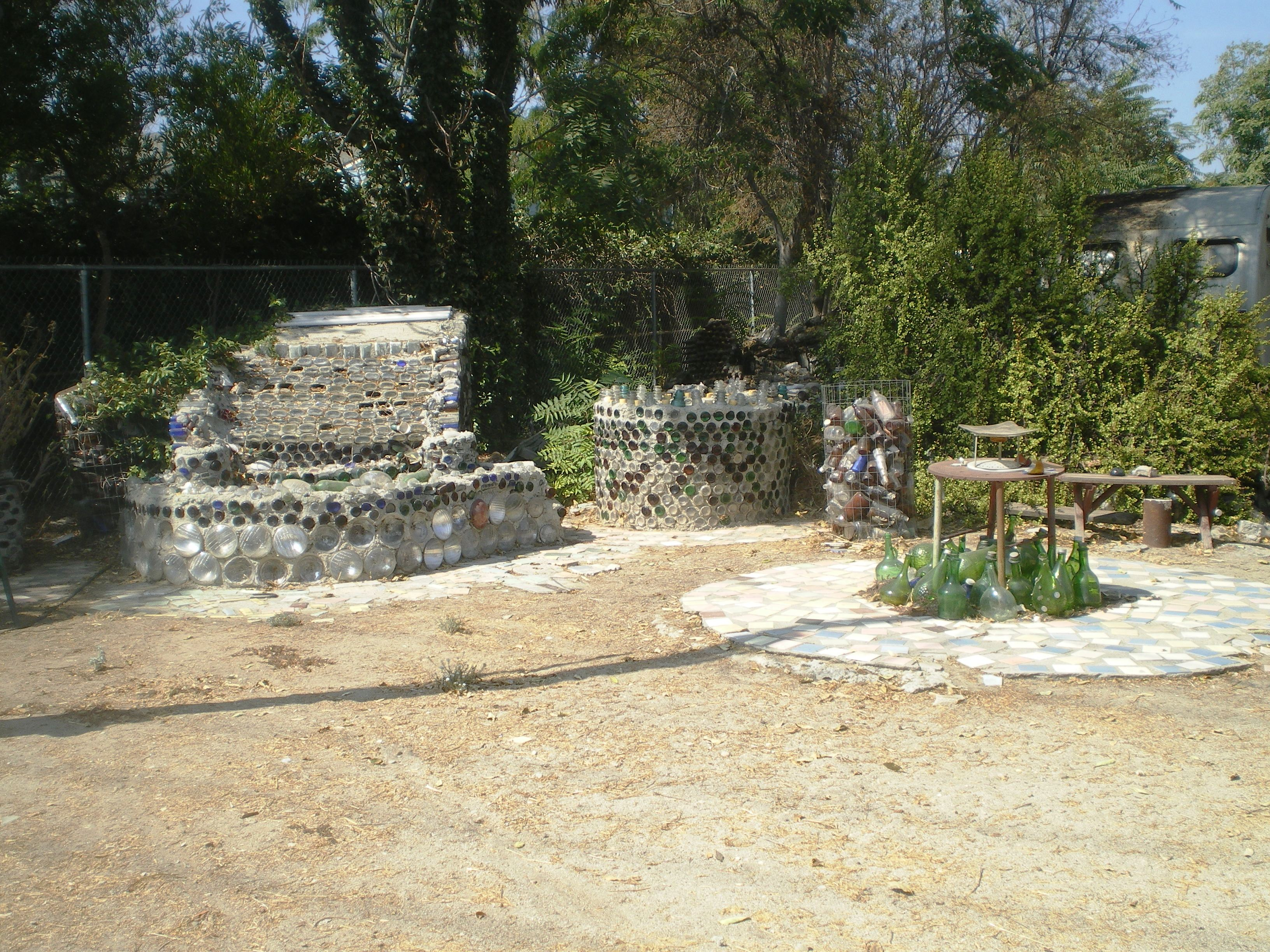
Bottle sculptures

== See also ==
- List of Registered Historic Places in Ventura County, California
- Ventura County Historic Landmarks & Points of Interest

== Relevant literature ==
- Rosen, Seymour. 1979. "In Celebration of Ourselves." California Living Books in conjunction with San Francisco Museum of Modern Art. 176 pages. ISBN 0893950084 (ISBN 9780893950088)
- Wojcik, Daniel. 2017. Outsider Art: Visionary Worlds and Trauma. Jackson: University Press of Mississippi. 304 pages. ISBN 9781496808066
