= Anniella geronimensis =

Conservation status
- Endangered (IUCN 3.1)

Scientific classification
- Kingdom: Animalia
- Phylum: Chordata
- Class: Reptilia
- Order: Squamata
- Suborder: Anguimorpha
- Family: Anniellidae
- Genus: Anniella
- Species: A. geronimensis

Binomial name
- Anniella geronimensis Shaw, 1940
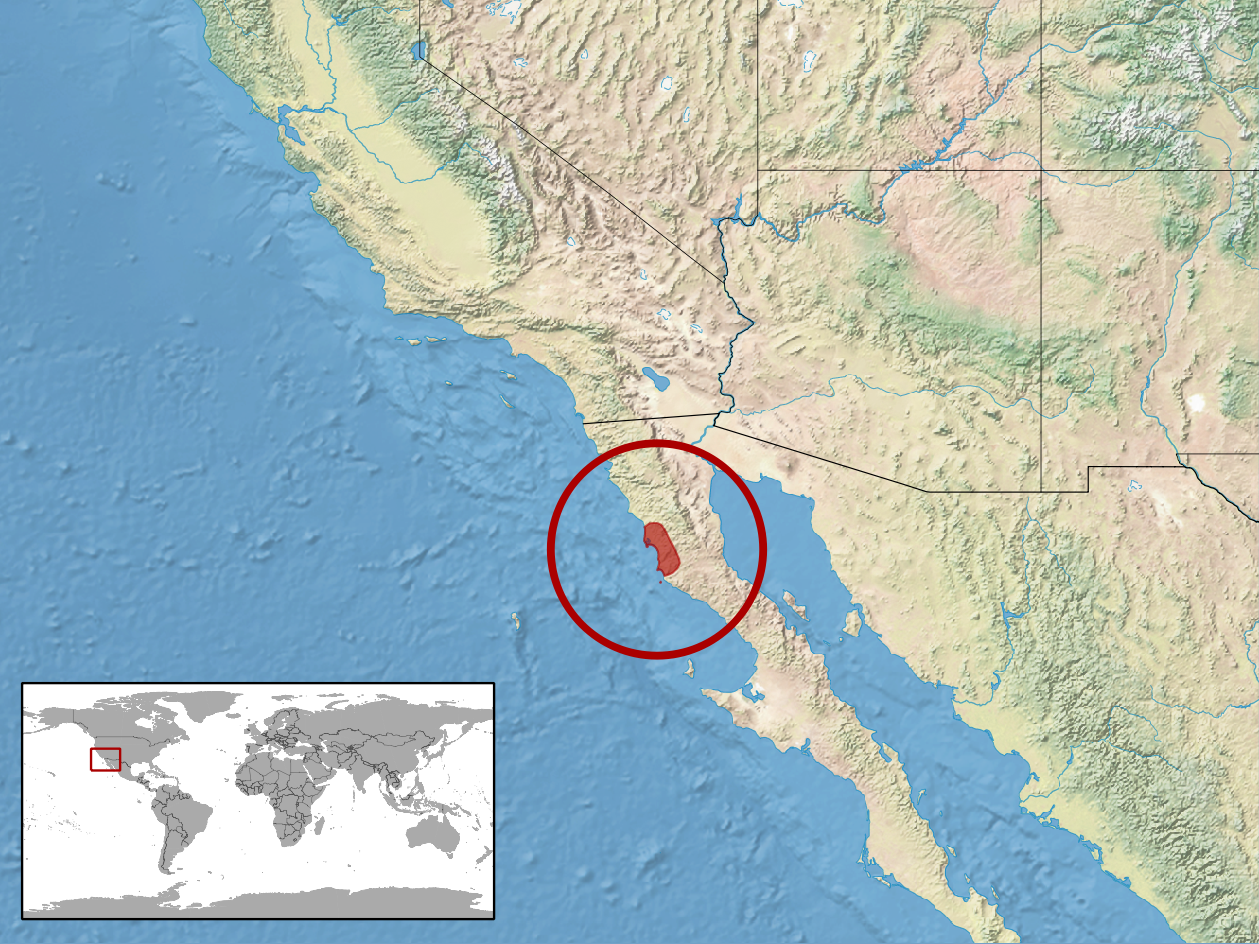

Species of lizard

Anniella geronimensis, also known as the Baja California legless lizard, is a species of legless lizard found in Mexico.
