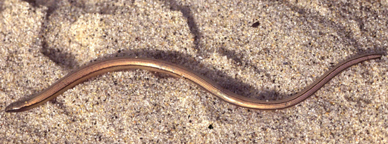
- Anniella pulchra

Scientific classification
- Kingdom: Animalia
- Phylum: Chordata
- Class: Reptilia
- Order: Squamata
- Suborder: Anguimorpha
- Infraorder: Neoanguimorpha
- Clade: Diploglossa
- Clade: Anguioidea
- Family: Anniellidae; Boulenger, 1885
- Genus: Anniella; Gray, 1852

Species
- See text.
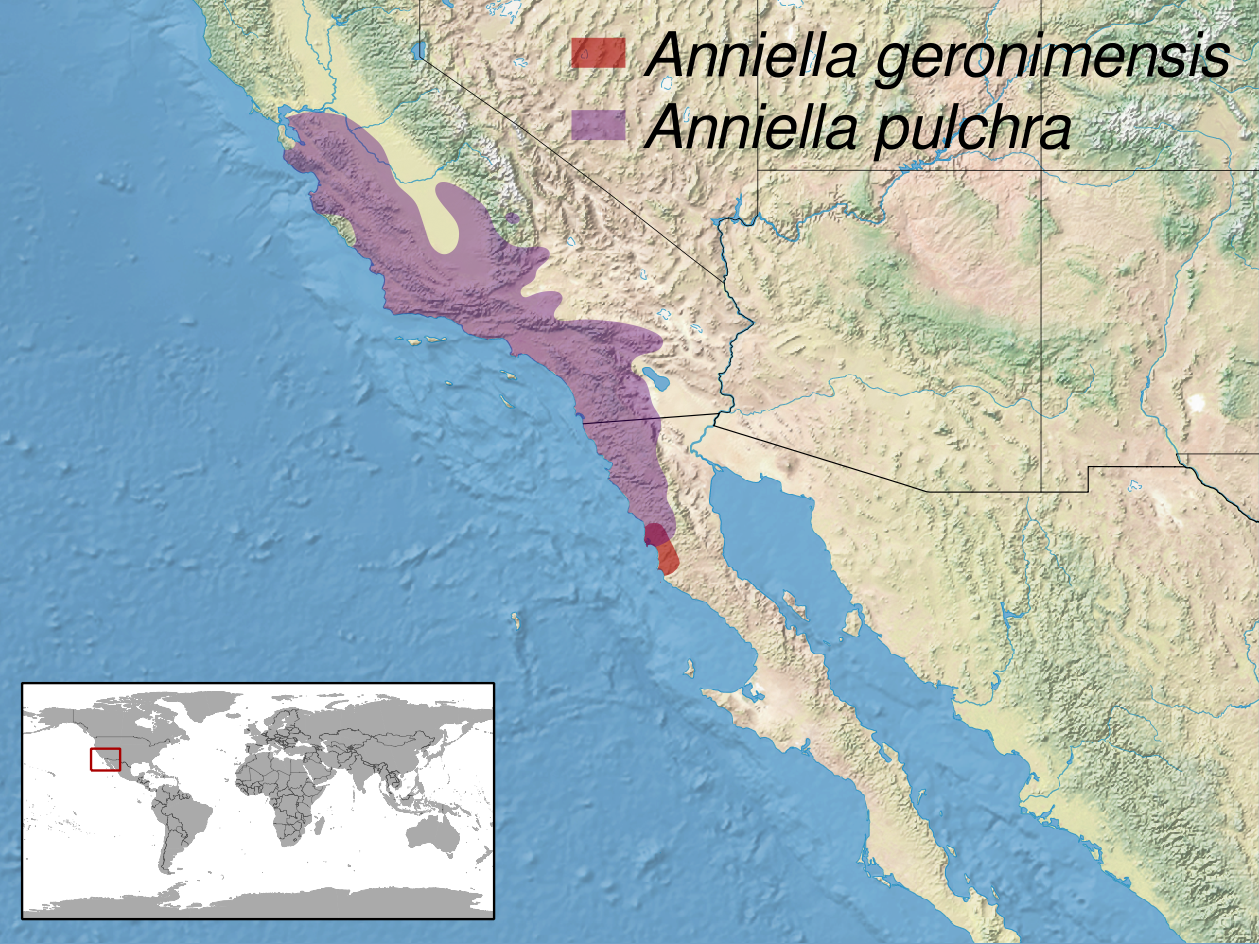

= American legless lizard =

Anniellidae

Family of lizards

The family Anniellidae, known as American legless lizards, contains six species in a single genus Anniella: A. pulchra (California legless lizard), the rare A. geronimensis (Baja California legless lizard), and four more discovered in 2013.

== Classification ==
The following species of Anniella are recognized:

- Anniella alexanderae Pappenfuss & Parham, 2013 – Temblor legless lizard
- Anniella campi Pappenfuss & Parham, 2013 – southern Sierra legless lizard
- Anniella geronimensis Shaw, 1940 – Baja California legless lizard
- Anniella grinnelli Pappenfuss & Parham, 2013 – Bakersfield legless lizard
- Anniella pulchra Gray 1852 – California legless lizard
- Anniella stebbinsi Pappenfuss & Parham, 2013 – southern California legless lizard

== See also ==
- Glass lizard
