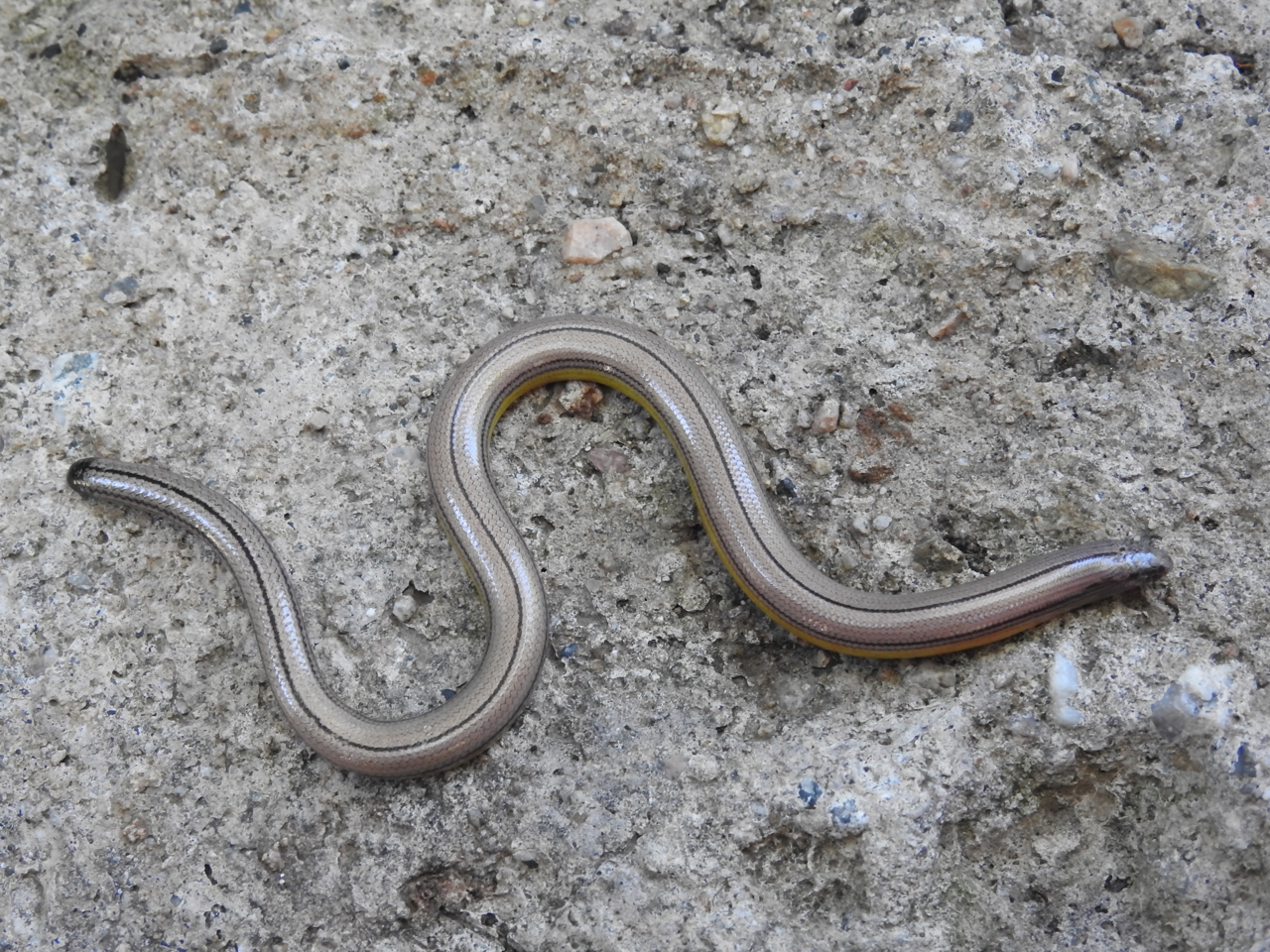

Scientific classification
- Kingdom: Animalia
- Phylum: Chordata
- Class: Reptilia
- Order: Squamata
- Suborder: Anguimorpha
- Family: Anniellidae
- Genus: Anniella
- Species: A. stebbinsi

Binomial name
- Anniella stebbinsi Papenfuss & Parham, 2013

= Anniella stebbinsi =

Species of lizard

Anniella stebbinsi, the Southern California or San Diegan legless lizard, is a small, slender lizard, and, as the name suggests, is legless. Not much is known about the lizard as a unique species, with most observations conducted while it was not recognised as separate from Anniella pulchra, the Californian legless lizard.

== Etymology ==
The specific name stebbinsi honors Robert C. Stebbins, an American herpetologist.

== Description ==
The Southern California legless lizard is small and slender, with no legs, a shovel-shaped snout, smooth shiny scales, and a blunt tail. On close observation, eyelids are also present, making clear that the species are lizards and not snakes. Its dorsum is light olive-brown, with strong yellow sides, and its ventral colour is moderate yellow. It also has a black mid-dorsal stripe with the length of less than one scale wide that stretches from the parietals to the tip of the tail, and multiple black stripes that are one scale wide from the eye to the tip of the tail. The holotype is adult female measuring 132 mm (5.2 in) in snout–vent length with 81 mm (3.2 in) regenerated tail.

== Distribution ==
This species is found from Southern California to the northern half of the state of Baja California (México). Sightings have been noted from as far north as Bakersfield, California to as far south as Ensenada, México. They have also been observed on the Mexican Islas de Todos Santos and the Islas Coronados. Further inland, the species has been seen in the Angeles National Forest, the San Bernardino National Forest, and the Cleveland National Forest in Southern California, and as far east as Mexicali, México.

== Habitat and conservation ==
Anniella stebbinsi is found across a wider range of habitats than any other species in the genus, mostly found in coastal sand dunes and a variety of interior habitats, including sandy washes and alluvial fans. They live mostly underground, burrowing in loose, sandy substrate. However, much of the coastal dune habitat has been destroyed by coastal development, from Ventura County in the north to around the Mexican Border with Tijuana and San Diego. However, a large, protected population survives in a preserved area of the once-extensive El Segundo Dunes habitat at the Los Angeles International Airport.

As of March 2017, the International Union for Conservation of Nature (IUCN) has not assessed this species for the IUCN Red List.
