= Santa Susana Depot =

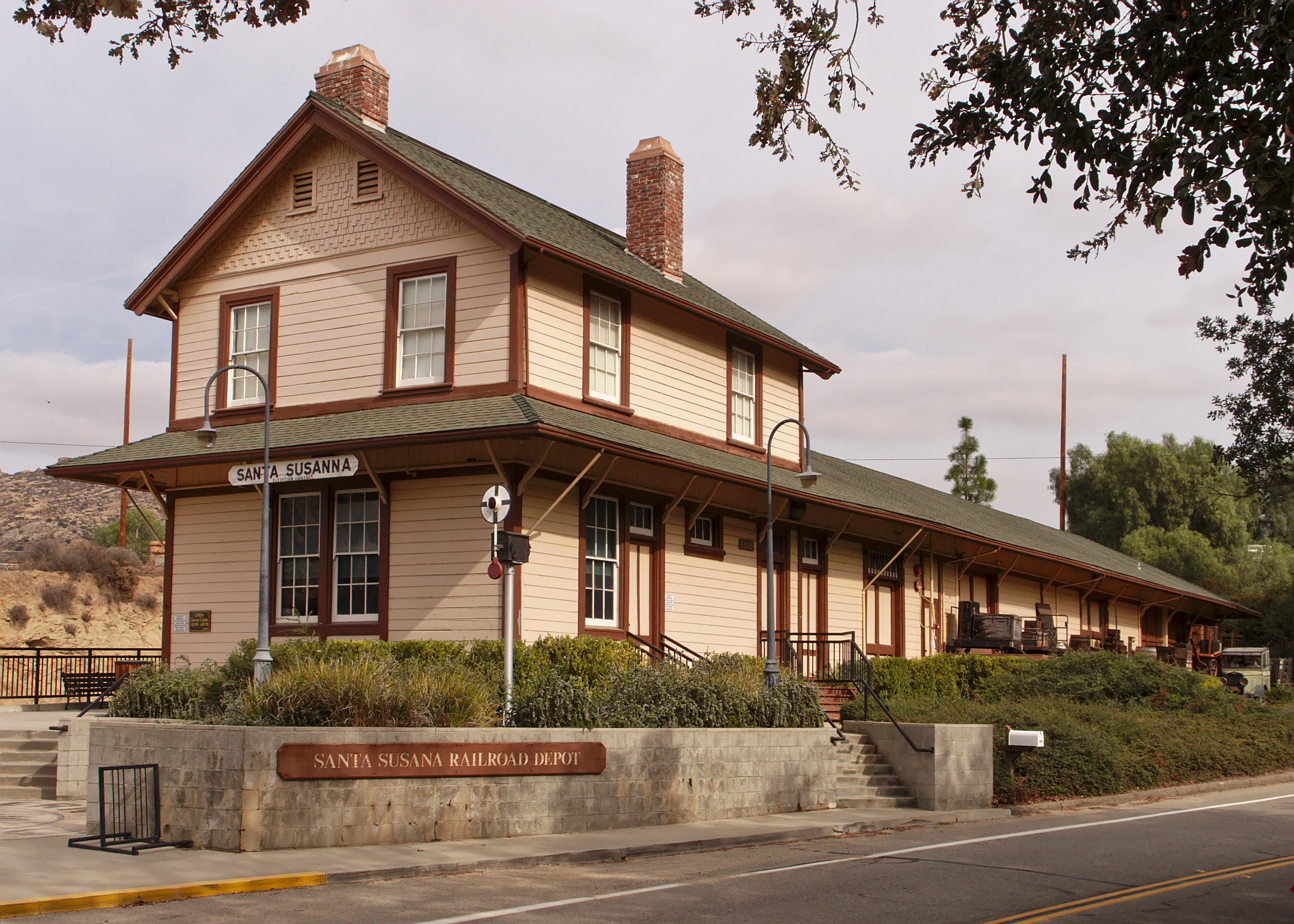
- View from the southwest

- Location within California

General information
- Architectural style: Stick/Eastlake
- Location: 6503 Katherine Road, Simi Valley, California
- Coordinates: 34.2607°N 118.6611°W
- Completed: 1903
- Owner: Rancho Simi Parks and Recreation Department

Design and construction
- Architect: Southern Pacific Railroad

Santa Susana Depot is a train station building located near the Santa Susana Pass in Simi Valley, California. Originally located on Los Angeles Avenue at Tapo Street, the depot opened in 1903. The station was named after the Santa Susana Mountains at the east end of the Simi Valley. The Southern Pacific Railroad used the double-"N" spelling of Susanna on the depot sign facing west, and the single-"N" spelling of Susana on the sign facing east. The Santa Susana Tunnel opened the next year, reducing the distance and transit time between Montalvo and Burbank on the Coast Route linking Los Angeles and San Francisco. Plans and construction for the building were based on Southern Pacific Railroad standard design Two-Story Combination Depot No. 22. The depot served the community of Rancho Simi as a passenger station, telegraph office, and freight depot where farmers could deliver crops for shipping and pick up farming equipment delivered by the railroad.

Due to lessening passenger traffic and changes in the shipment of freight, Southern Pacific closed the station in the early 1970s, leaving Santa Susana Depot empty and destined for demolition. The County of Ventura purchased the depot from the railroad for $1.06. In May 1975 the building was divided into three parts and moved by truck to county property two miles east of the site it was built on. The County of Ventura designated the building Landmark #29 in January 1976.

The current Simi Valley station for Amtrak's Pacific Surfliner and Metrolink's Ventura County Line is located one mile east of the original Tapo Street depot location.

== Current status ==
The current location is next to the same railroad right of way it once served. The building sat abandoned for several years suffering vandalism, and arson caused fire damage. A nonprofit organization was formed to restore the building and ready it for public use in conjunction with the Rancho Simi Parks and Recreation Department.

The museum was opened to the public in 2000. The depot building now houses a railroad museum, an HO scale model railroad layout, and a public meeting room. The museum focuses on railroad history in the region and has many artifacts and historic photos on display. Along with the railroad-related features, the museum also has a collection of materials related to the nearby Corriganville Movie Ranch. The railroad layout models the coast route between Los Angeles, California, and Portland, Oregon, with scenery that targets the early 1950s. The Santa Susana Railroad Historical Society designs, maintains and operates the layout. Both the museum and the model layout are open on Saturdays and Sundays from 1 p.m. to 4 p.m. with the exception of holidays.

== See also ==
- Santa Susana, California
- Saticoy Southern Pacific Railroad Depot - similar landmark also in Ventura County
- Ventura County Historic Landmarks & Points of Interest

Preceding station	Southern Pacific Railroad	Following station
Moorpark toward San Francisco	Coast Line	Chatsworth toward Los Angeles
