= Blackburn Cult =

1922–1930 new religious movement

The Blackburn Cult, officially the Divine Order of the Royal Arms of the Great Eleven, or the Great Eleven Club, was a new religious movement started in 1922 by the American woman May Otis Blackburn. She started the group on Bunker Hill in Downtown Los Angeles, California, and later formed a retreat in the Southern California Simi Valley.

Blackburn was said to have received revelations directly from angels, and, along with her daughter Ruth Wieland Rizzio, believed that she was charged by the archangel Gabriel to write books revealing the mysteries of Heaven and Earth, and life and death.

Newspaper articles from the period reported strange rituals including the sacrifice of animals, sex scandals and attempts to resurrect a dead 16-year-old girl. Police found the corpse of young woman Willa Rhoads under the floor at the Rhoadses' residence, wrapped in spices and salt, and surrounded by the bodies of seven dead dogs. Mr. and Mrs. Rhoads later confessed to the police that they had placed their daughter in the tomb fourteen months earlier at the suggestion of May Otis Blackburn. The cult was also accused of killing a member in an oven, poisoning another during a "whirling dervish" ceremony, and making several other members disappear.

== Indicted for grand theft ==
In 1929, group leaders were indicted in Los Angeles for grand theft and investigated in connection with the disappearances of several members. These indictments created a sensation after the background of the grand theft was revealed to the public. May Otis Blackburn was charged with twelve counts of grand theft, and articles at that time referred to her as a "cult leader".

According to Time magazine, the Blackburn Cult was also known as "The Great Eleven", and May Otis Blackburn was referred to as the "Heel of God".

The cult collapsed after May Otis Blackburn was imprisoned for stealing 40,000 dollars from Clifford Dabney.

== Depicted in theatrical productions ==
In October 2007, actresses playing May Otis Blackburn and Ruth Rizzio appeared in the Ghost Tour in Strathearn Park, in Simi Valley, California. The actress playing Blackburn stated: "May Otis is really fun and flamboyant ... She's a cult leader. Who wouldn't want to play a cult leader?" The Ghost Tour in Robert P. Strathearn Historical Park had previously featured Blackburn in 1999.

== Subject of fictionalized history ==
In 2008, R.J. Baudé, son of the last surviving member of the Great Eleven, published a fact-based novel about the group, The Blackburn Chronicles: A Tale of Murder, Money and Madness. The Kept Girl, Kim Cooper's novel about the cult, was published in 2014.

== Non-fiction/historical accounts ==
S. Fort (2014) wrote a detailed historical account of the rise and fall of the Divine Order of the Royal Arms of the Great Eleven.

The Blackburn Cult was the subject of episode 632 of The Dollop Podcast, released on 7 May 2024.
