= Anniella alexanderae =

Conservation status
- Critically Imperiled (NatureServe)

Scientific classification
- Kingdom: Animalia
- Phylum: Chordata
- Class: Reptilia
- Order: Squamata
- Suborder: Anguimorpha
- Family: Anniellidae
- Genus: Anniella
- Species: A. alexanderae

Binomial name
- Anniella alexanderae Papenfuss & Parham, 2013

Species of lizard

Anniella alexanderae, also known as the temblor legless lizard, is a species of legless lizard found in California,
