= Corriganville Movie Ranch =

Film studio and movie ranch in California, US

Coordinates: 34°16′0″N 118°38′57″W

Corriganville Movie Ranch was a working film studio and movie ranch for outdoor location shooting, as well as a Western-themed tourist attraction. The ranch, owned by actor and stuntman Ray "Crash" Corrigan, was located in the foothills of the Santa Susana Mountains in the Santa Susana Pass area of Simi Valley in eastern Ventura County, California. It was destroyed by wildfires in 1970 and 1979. The site is currently a public park in the City of Simi Valley, called Corriganville Park, and operated by Rancho Simi Recreation and Park District.

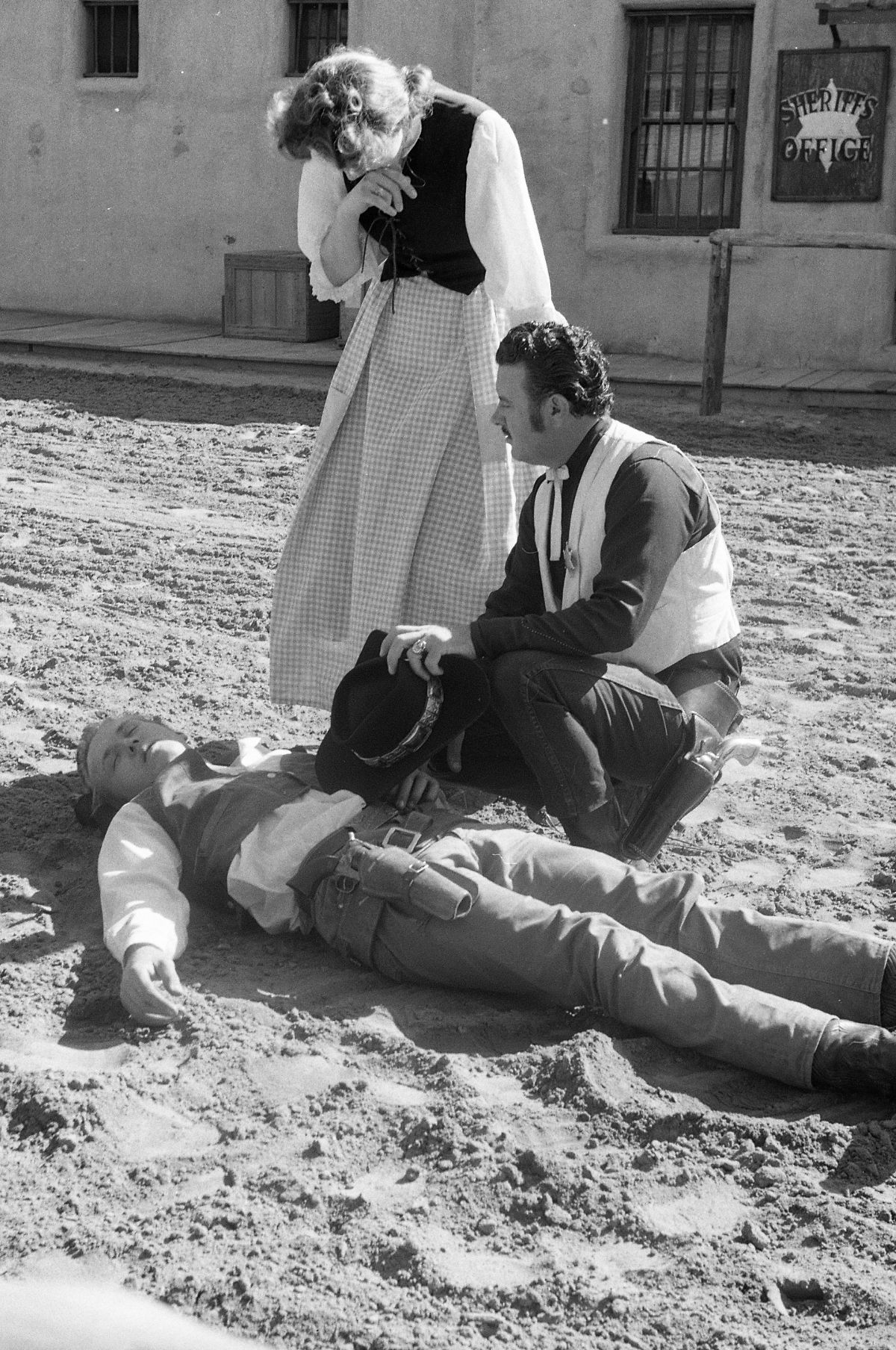
Actors in an outdoor shooting-and-death scene, 1963

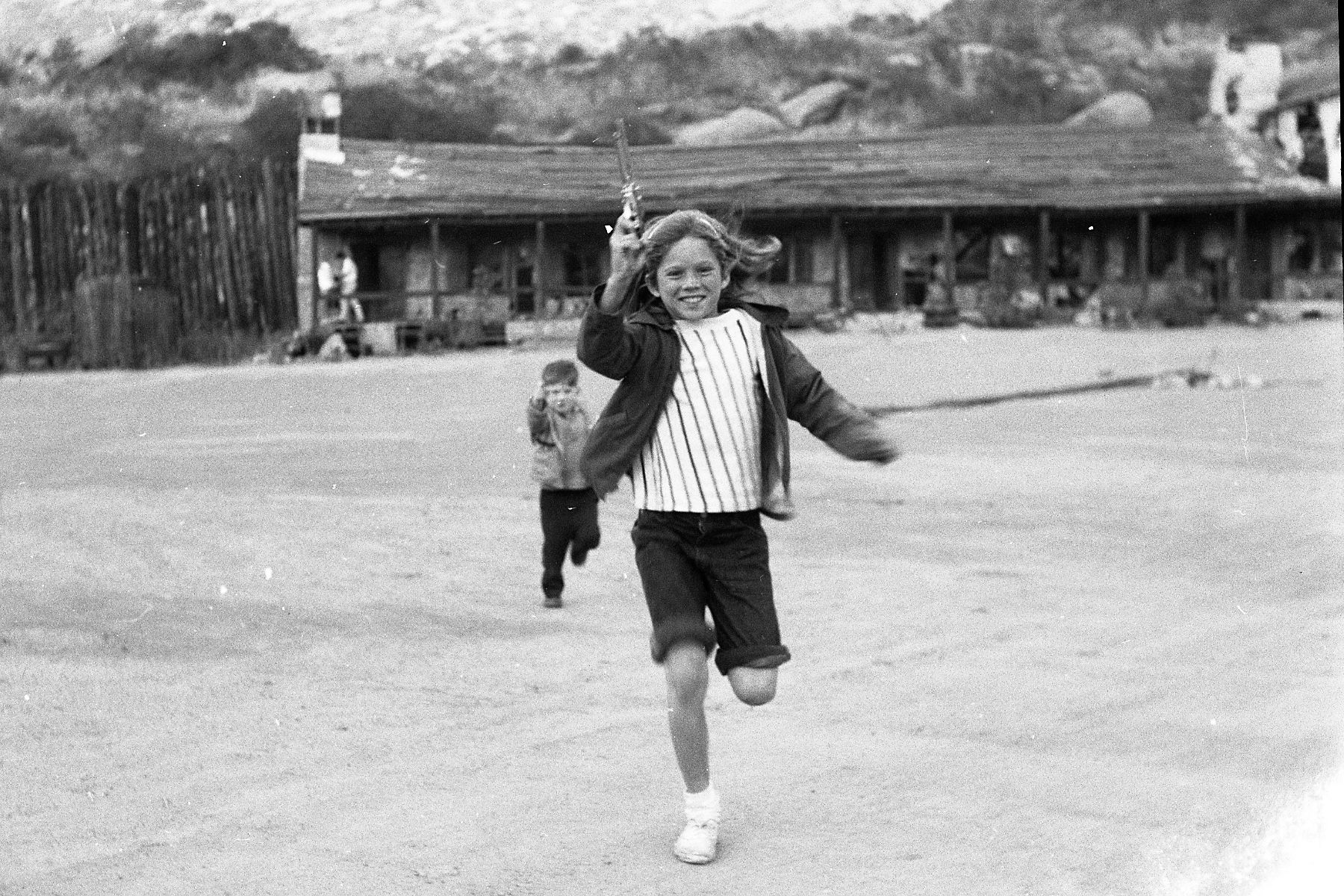
Children playing at Corriganville, 1963.

== Movies ==
Built on land purchased by Corrigan in 1937, the ranch provided scenery as well as man-made structures and sets, and served as the background scenery for movies and television programs such as Fort Apache, Buffalo Bill in Tomahawk Territory, The Robe, The Lone Ranger, The Adventures of Rin Tin Tin, Sky King, Circus Boy, and Star Trek.

In 2018, the park's filmmaking roots were revived when transformed into Spahn Ranch for Quentin Tarantino's 9th film, Once Upon a Time in Hollywood. Corriganville's terrain replicates the Manson hideout perfectly as it is located a few miles from the actual Spahn Ranch location. Brad Pitt, Leonardo DiCaprio, and Margot Robbie all play key roles in this critically acclaimed film.

The visual environment was that of a picturesque California oak woodland. The ranch provided terrain such as lakes, mountains, caves, rock outcroppings and overhangs, and large boulders. The small man-made lake featured a cliff waterfall, as well as an underwater bunker with thick-glassed windows that would allow underwater scenes to be shot, while keeping the camera and crew dry.

Other sets included Silvertown, a western street with saloon, hotel, jail, livery stable, corral, blacksmith, shops, and a bank. There was also an outlaw shack and a church that doubled as a schoolhouse. Some of these structures had small living quarters while others had showers and restrooms for the cast and crew. It's unclear if any had interior sets that were used onscreen, although there was a soundstage in the hotel building where interior sets may have been constructed for the movie companies' use (jail cell, bunkhouse, etc.). Many of the interior shots may have been made at various studios around Hollywood—Republic Studios, Monogram Studios, etc. in order to match the outdoor scenes shot at Corriganville. Corrigan's own home on the property was used for ranch-house exterior shots. His house was one of the first structures erected at the ranch in 1938–1939.

A non-Western set built in 1946 for Howard Hughes' Vendetta (released in 1950) was called Vendetta Village. It was later renamed the Corsican Village. A Cavalry fort built for John Ford's 1948 film Fort Apache was subsequently rented to many other film productions by Corrigan.

Cowboy stars who filmed there include: Gene Autry, Roy Rogers, Buster Crabbe, John Wayne, Randolph Scott, Smiley Burnette, Clayton Moore, Jay Silverheels, Charles Starrett, Ken Maynard, Kermit Maynard, Hoot Gibson, Bob Steele, Tex Ritter, Robert Taylor and of course Crash Corrigan himself.

Scenes from Season 1, Episode 3 of the HBO series Westworld were filmed at Corriganville Park in 2016. Estimates of the number of movies and television shows filmed there range from the hundreds to the thousands.

== Tourism ==
The ranch was open to the public on weekends and holidays from 1949 to 1965. For an admission price of one dollar, visitors could experience a variety of stuntman shows, movie and TV actors (often Crash himself) signing autographs and posing for pictures, western street movie sets ("Silvertown"), frontier Army fort ("Fort Apache"), and Mexican village, many made up of real working buildings and not just set fronts as is common on many studio backlots. Other weekend attractions included live western music, Indian crafts, stagecoach rides, pony rides, and boating on the ranch's artificial lake.

== Transition ==
In 1965 Ray Corrigan sold the property, which was acquired by comedian and property speculator Bob Hope. A housing subdivision called Hopetown was developed and built on a parcel near the park entrance in the mid-1990s. In the late 1960s and early 1970s part of the site was used for motorcycle racing. In 1970 the ranch was swept by fire. One of the last movies filmed there was Vigilante Force (1976). In 1979 another fire destroyed virtually all of the remaining structures. In 1988, 190 acres (0.77 km^{2}) of land comprising the principal working areas of the original Corriganville Ranch were purchased by the City of Simi Valley for use as a regional park.

== Regional park ==
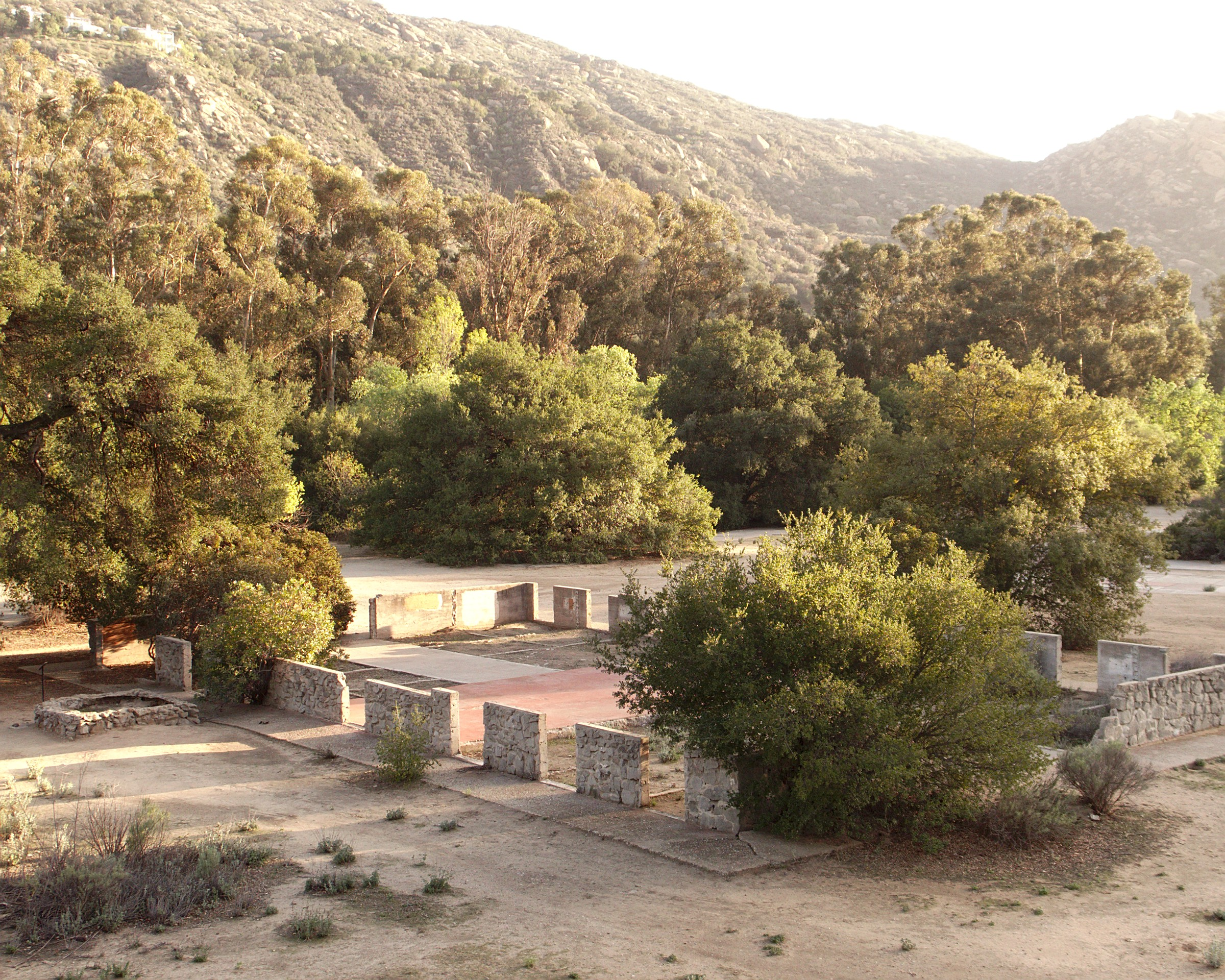
Foundations from old movie sets at Corriganville Regional Park

Now named Corriganville Park, the site of Corriganville Movie Ranch is a public park operated by Rancho Simi Recreation and Park District.

The park has various concrete and brick foundations, the remains of movie and theme park buildings. Several signs present photographs and descriptions of filming locations. Hiking trails provide views from dramatic rock formations that made the park a popular filming location from the 1930s to 1960s. The park and the entire Santa Susana Pass area has many sites and vistas seen in movies and especially 1950s television westerns.

The park's eastern area is part of the Santa Susana Pass wildlife corridor connecting the Simi Hills (and the Santa Monica Mountains) with the Santa Susana Mountains (and Tehachapi Mountains and San Gabriel Mountains). Hiking trails provide exploration and views. Rocky Peak Park is adjacent to the east. Several historic photos and pieces of memorabilia from Corriganville are on display at the nearby Santa Susana Depot.

== See also ==
- Chatsworth Formation sandstone
- Santa Susana Mountains topics
- Ventura County Historic Landmarks & Points of Interest

== Bibliography ==
- Schneider, Jerry L. Corriganville Movie Ranch Lulu.com, 01/08/2007 ISBN 978-1-4303-1224-6
