= Anniella grinnelli =

Scientific classification
- Kingdom: Animalia
- Phylum: Chordata
- Class: Reptilia
- Order: Squamata
- Suborder: Anguimorpha
- Family: Anniellidae
- Genus: Anniella
- Species: A. grinnelli

Binomial name
- Anniella grinnelli Papenfuss & Parham, 2013

Species of lizard

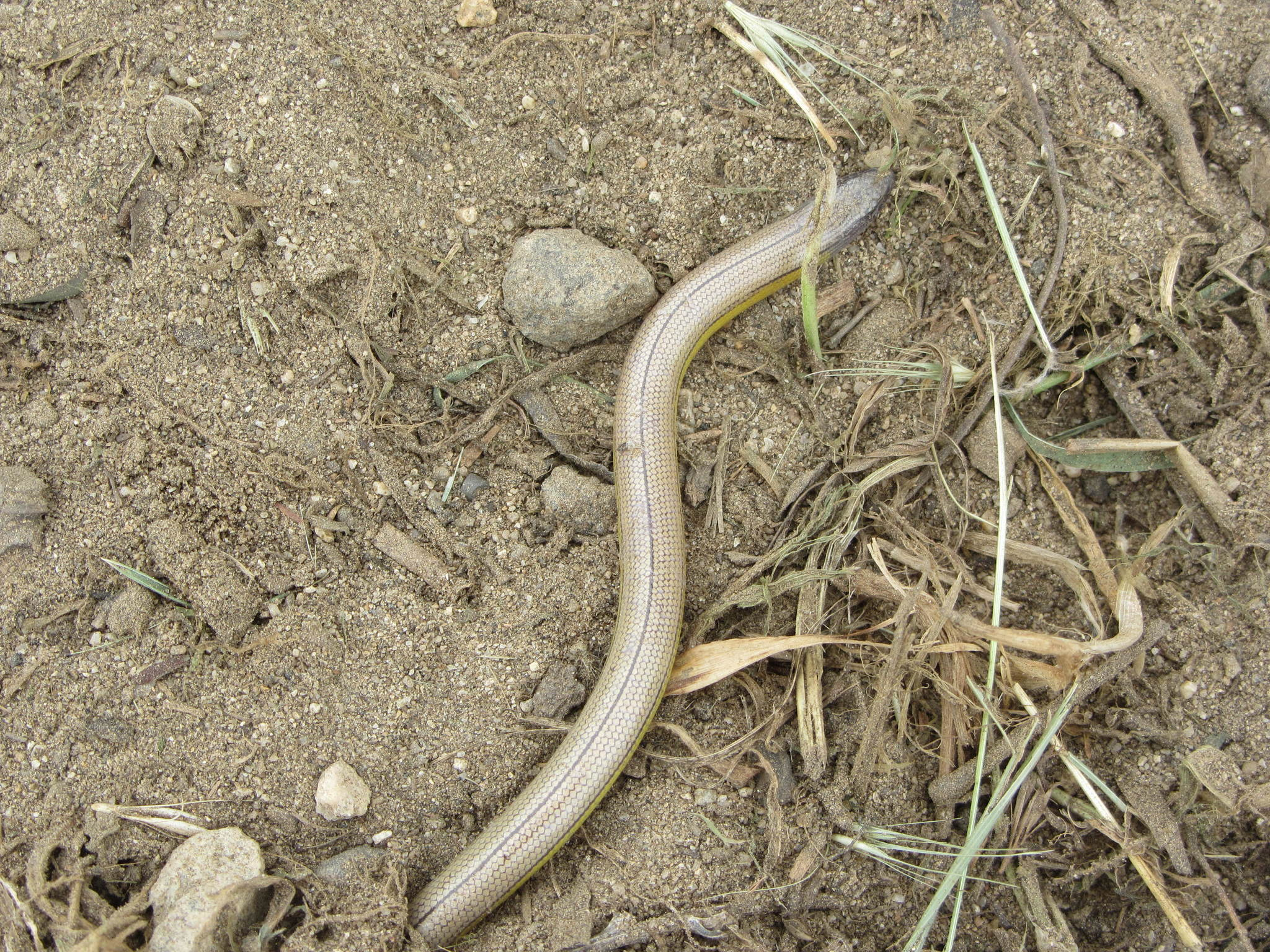
An Aniella grinnelli individual

Anniella grinnelli, also known as the Bakersfield legless lizard, is a species of legless lizard found in California,
