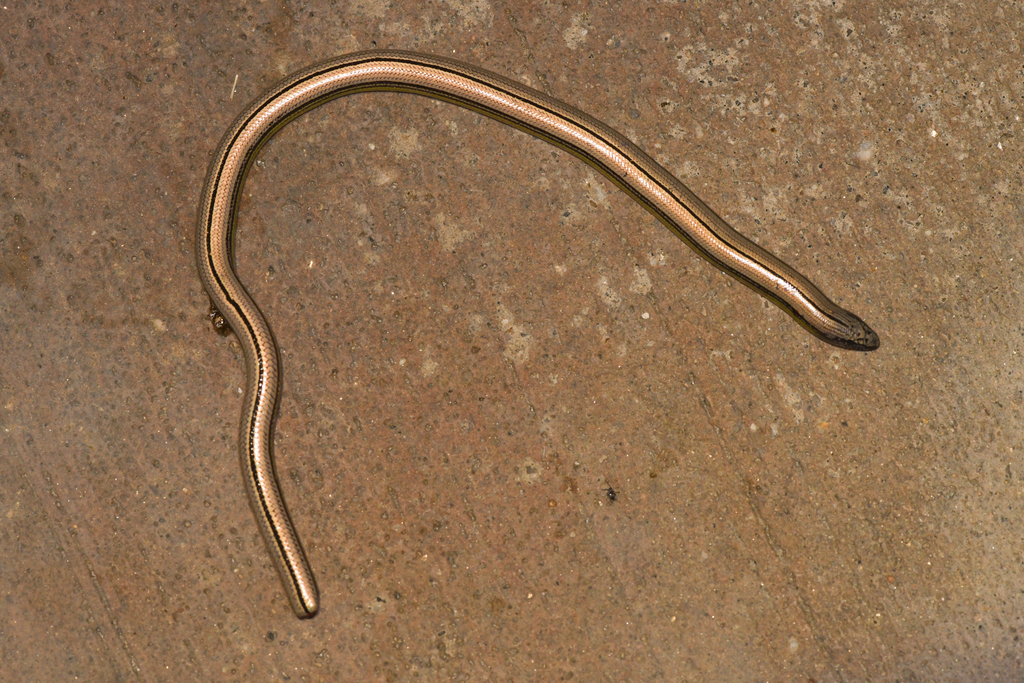

Conservation status
- Critically Imperiled (NatureServe)

Scientific classification
- Kingdom: Animalia
- Phylum: Chordata
- Class: Reptilia
- Order: Squamata
- Suborder: Anguimorpha
- Family: Anniellidae
- Genus: Anniella
- Species: A. campi

Binomial name
- Anniella campi Papenfuss & Parham, 2013

Synonyms
- Anniella campi Papenfuss & Parham 2013

= Anniella campi =

Species of lizard

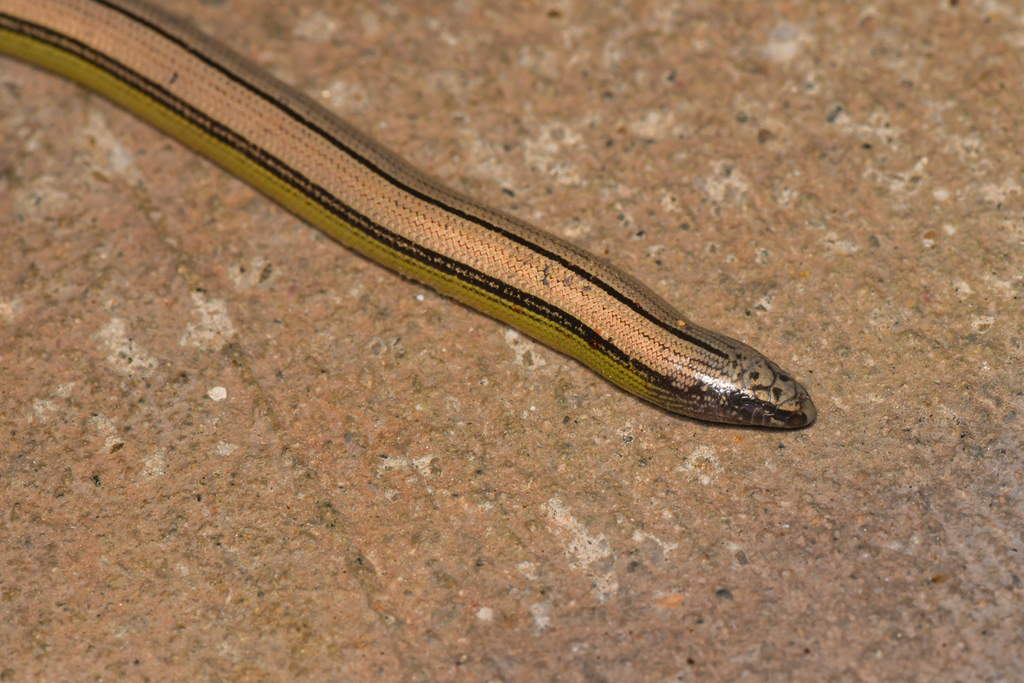
The double dark lateral stripe distinguishes A. campi from other legless lizards.

Anniella campi, also known as the Southern Sierra legless lizard, is a species of legless lizard found in California, specifically in the Sierra Nevada. It was previously known as Anniella pulchra. It has double dark lateral stripes.
