= May Otis Blackburn =

Cult leader, criminal defendant (1881–1951)

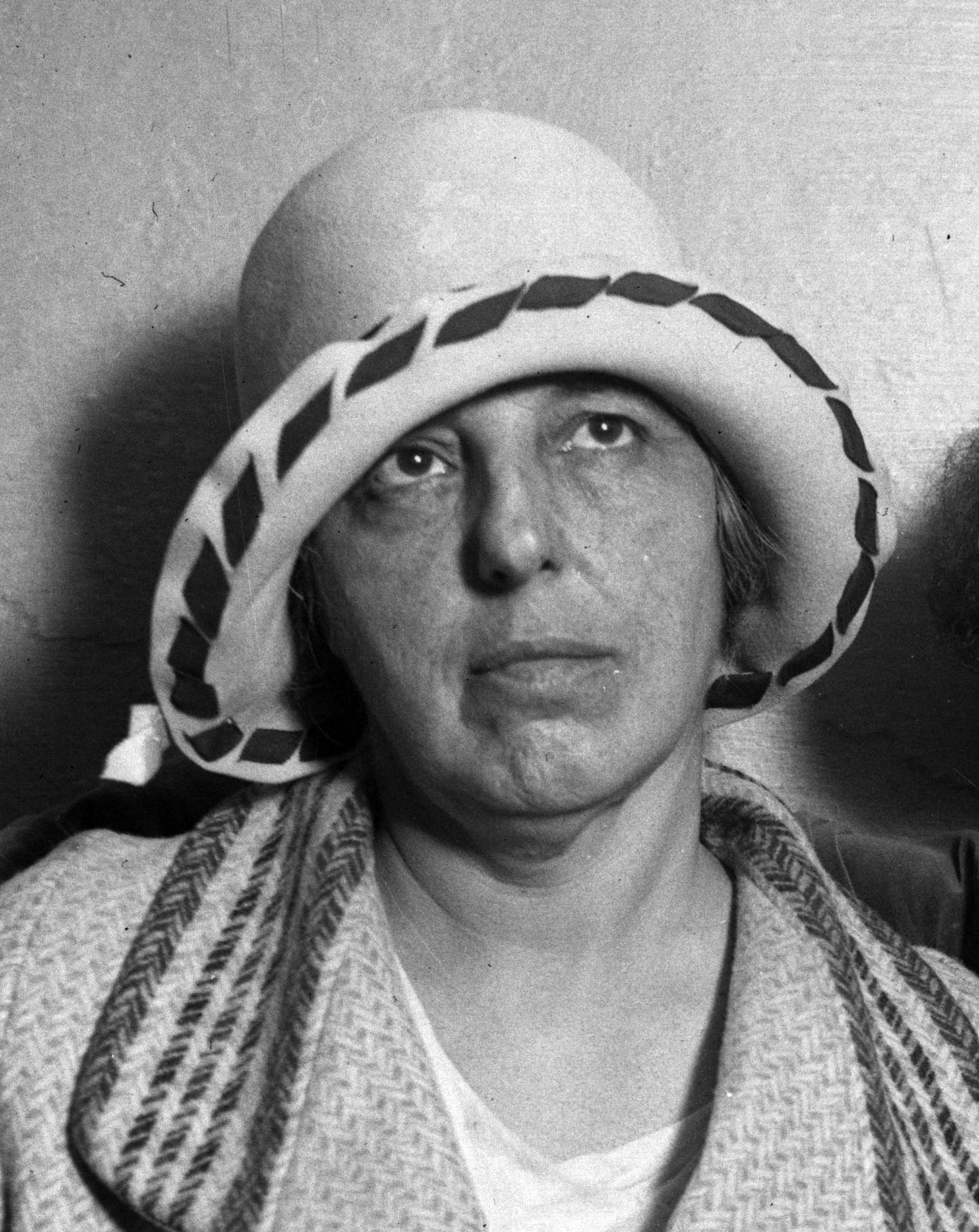
May Otis Blackburn in 1929

May Otis Blackburn (August 2, 1881, Storm Lake, Iowa – June 17, 1951, Los Angeles, California) was the founder and self-appointed Queen and High Priestess of the 1920s Los Angeles new religious movement, "The Divine Order of the Royal Arms of the Great Eleven." The organization was also known as the "Blackburn Cult," the "Cult of the Great Eleven," and the "Great Eleven Club." She is notable as an ultimately successful defendant in an unusual legal case turning on whether her failure to publish and print a promised book was knowingly fraudulent as contended by the complaining witness, Clifford Dabney.

According to the Supreme Court of California, "The issue concerning the guilt or innocence of the defendant of the crime of grand larceny in obtaining said sums of money from Dabney, and appellant's defense thereto, turned largely upon the question of good faith and actual belief of the defendant in the truth of the representations made to Dabney, and which induced Dabney to pay over the money. There was substantial evidence in favor of the prosecution, but also there was substantial evidence in favor of the defendant upon that issue."

The Supreme Court of California further stated that, "Criminal statutes which prescribe punishment for false representations primarily were intended to protect persons against those who report falsely with respect to their earthly and material possessions. Any legislative attempt to limit or regulate persons in their claims to the possession of exceptional spiritual power or knowledge would be rejected as a dangerous invasion of the state into the realm of religious freedom and privilege, which, from the beginning of our government, has been guarded by constitutional barriers."

The court implied that "mentally healthy" people are responsible for their decisions to associate themselves with religious orders and "chimerical delusions" such as the one created by May Otis Blackburn.

== Chronology ==
In 1922, May Blackburn and her daughter, Ruth, began proclaiming themselves as the two witnesses of the Book of Revelation and assembled a collection of followers from Portland and Los Angeles, and later from around the country. Blackburn claimed that the angels Gabriel and Michael were dictating a book (initially dubbed "The Seventh Trumpet of Gabriel," but later changed to "The Great Sixth Seal") to her and her daughter that explained all the secrets of the universe. She promised that when the book was published, the Seventh Seal described in Revelation would be broken in heaven and an apocalyptic event would occur.

She then created an order called "The Divine Order of the Royal Arms of the Great Eleven," the name derived from her proclamation that after the apocalypse eleven queens would rule the world from mansions on Olive Hill, in Hollywood. She required believers to give her money, property, and various other objects of value to support her and her daughter's work.

In 1929, a former member of the group, Clifford Dabney, nephew of oil magnate Joseph B. Dabney, accused May Blackburn of defrauding him of $50,000.00. His claim triggered an investigation by the District Attorney which led to a charge that Blackburn had defrauded her followers of more than $200,000.00 from 1922 to 1929. She was also suspected of involvement in the possible deaths or disappearance of several former followers. The organization's most notable alleged victims include Blackburn's son-in-law, Samuel Rizzio, missing and thought to have been poisoned for striking Blackburn's daughter, though his body was never found; Willa Rhoads, deceased, a cult "princess" who died under mysterious circumstances, and whose body was kept preserved on ice for fourteen months before being ritually buried with seven sacrificial dogs beneath the floor of her parents' home; and Frances Turner, deceased, a paralyzed woman who was placed in a makeshift oven for two days, resulting in death.

On March 2, 1930, Blackburn was convicted of eight counts of grand theft. She was allowed to remain in the L.A. county jail pending her appeal, however. The case was ultimately elevated to the California Supreme Court. On November 30, 1931, that court ruled that evidence regarding suspected cult deaths or disappearances were introduced by prosecutors that had no bearing on the fraud charges and which prejudiced the jury against Blackburn. The court also warned that any legislative attempt to regulate Blackburn's claimed possession of exceptional spiritual power had to be rejected because it would be a dangerous invasion of the state into the realm of religious freedom and privilege guaranteed by the Constitution, and that "mentally healthy" people such as Clifford Dabney are responsible for their decisions to associate themselves with religious orders such as the one created by May Blackburn.

The court concluded:

"We have set forth but briefly disclosures of the record before us, and in our investigation we have been unable to see what relevancy the gruesome story of the preservation of the body of Willa Rhoads, in the promise of resurrection, could have borne to the issue of whether or not the defendant applied the moneys which she received from the complaining witness to the purposes for which they were procured.

"The same lack of relevancy exists in the admission of evidence directed to the alleged attempt of the defendant to administer poison to one Sammy Rizzio. We feel, as did the District Court of Appeal, that the evidence as to both of the events above adverted to, must have prejudiced the defendant in the minds of the jury to the extent that the testimony offered in her defense could not have received the deliberate consideration that the law accords to all persons charged with crime.

"All other matters of importance have been properly disposed of in the decision of said District Court of Appeal.

"The judgment and order are reversed."

== Aftermath ==
May Blackburn was freed and there was insufficient evidence to charge her with any additional crimes. However, her organization was in decline as a consequence of negative publicity surrounding her investigation and trial. Blackburn published "The Origin of God" in 1936, a book that contains elements of her former proclamations. She died June 17, 1951, in Los Angeles.
